= Serbia in the Middle Ages =

Period of Serbian history in the 6th to 16th centuries

The medieval period in the history of Serbia began in the 6th century with the Slavic migrations to the Balkans, and lasted until the Ottoman conquest of Serbian lands in the second half of the 15th century. The period is also extended to 1537, when Pavle Bakić, the last titular Despot of Serbia in Hungarian exile, fell in the Battle of Gorjani.

At the time of settling, Serbs were already transitioning from a tribal community into a feudal society. The first Serbian state with established political identity was founded by prince Vlastimir in the mid-9th century. It was followed by other Serbian proto states, unstable due to the constant clashes with the Bulgarians, Hungarians and Byzantines, and by the conflict between Rome and Constantinople regarding the Christianization with the Byzantines getting the upper hand in the 9th century.

By the second half of the 10th century the Principality of Serbia, enlarged but unconsolidated, prone to the internal tribalism and foreign attacks, collapsed leaving Serbian lands to the plunderers. Serbian statehood moved to Duklja, which at one point reunited almost all Serbian lands, but the Byzantines successfully sidelined it. The stable, unified, and continuous Grand Principality of Serbia was established in the late 11th century by Vukan. While under the rule of Stefan Nemanja and his descendants, the Nemanjić dynasty, Serbia achieved its Golden Age which lasted until the 14th century, when as a powerful state (kingdom from 1217, empire from 1346), it dominated the majority of the Balkan Peninsula.

By the 14th century, Serbia was a fully developed feudal state. Foundations were set by King Milutin (1282–1321), the most important Serbian medieval ruler, who halted expansion of the state in 1299 to consolidate it. Serbia peaked during the reign of king and later Emperor Dušan (1331–55). He expanded the state to encompass modern Serbia south of the Sava and the Danube, Macedonia, Montenegro, Albania, east Herzegovina, Epirus and Thessaly, organized Serbia after the Byzantine Empire, and introduced codified law.

There was a tight union of state and church which became autocephalous in 1219 under Saint Sava, and a patriarchate in 1346, rivaling the status of Ecumenical Patriarchate in Constantinople. The rulers endowed numerous monasteries, like Mileševa, Peć, Morača, Sopoćani, Visoki Dečani, Gračanica, which are today monuments with an important symbolism for Serbs. The union accelerated cultural development and moved beyond the realm of simply translating Byzantine works and established a unique Serbian civilization. Political and cultural growth was followed by economic growth. Agriculture developed; and while silver, tin and copper had been mined during the Roman era, mining vastly expanded in this period. Trade boomed as well utilizing old Roman roads.

The apex was short-lived. Dušan's death was followed by disintegration of state under rival family branches and local leaders. The last emperor, Uroš, died in 1371. The major pretender to the unified throne was King Vukašin, but he died clashing with the Ottomans in 1371. The next who appeared able to restore Serbia was Prince Lazar Hrebeljanović, ruler of the expanded Moravian Serbia. The major clash with advancing Ottomans occurred on 28 June 1389 at Kosovo Polje. Both rulers, Sultan Murad I and prince Lazar, were killed in the battle. Due to its importance, magnitude, and consequences, the battle, its participants and circumstances were enshrined and immortalized in folk poetry and literature. It transcended the historical importance, reaching a spiritual level by the 19th century, and turned Kosovo into the "Jerusalem of the Serbs". Despite the defeat, Serbia endured for another 70 years, experiencing a territorial and cultural revival under Despot Stefan Lazarević (1389–1427). Serbian resistance continued until the fall of Smederevo in 1459.

Despite the claimed significance in which Turkish rule shaped national consciousness of the Serbs, the fall under the Ottomans was dubbed by the Serbian historians as "Turkish night". The conquest severed continuity of economic, social and political development, and Serbia was cut off from the European cultural and political society where it was carving its own place. When development of Serbia and the rest of Europe in the 15th and the 19th century are compared, it shows the enormous erosion and falling behind.

== Introduction ==
=== Background ===
Byzantine provinces on the territory of modern-day Serbia during the 6th century

During the 6th century, at the beginning of the early medieval period, territory of later Serbia was controlled mainly by the Byzantine Empire (southern and central regions), and also by Byzantine neighboring rivals, the Gepid Kingdom and the Ostrogothic Kingdom (northern regions). During the reign of Byzantine emperor Justinian I (527–565), defensive structures in the region were reinforced. In 535, the newly founded city of Justiniana Prima became center of the Archbishopric of Justiniana Prima, with metropolitan jurisdiction over all provinces of the Diocese of Dacia. At the beginning of the 7th century, region was invaded by Avars and Slavs, thus ending the Byzantine rule.

=== Slavic settlement ===
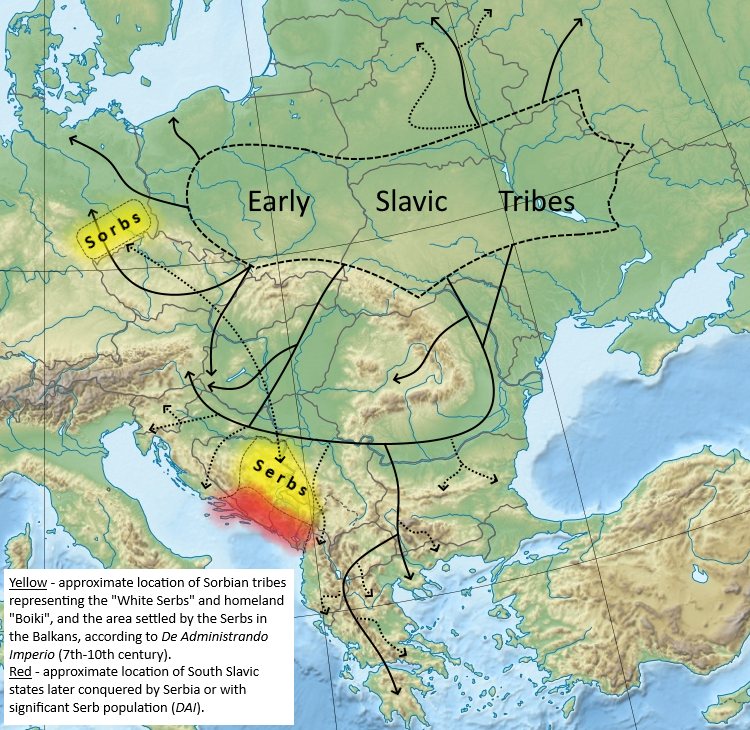
Slavic migrations to the Balkans

The Slavs in general were mentioned by the Roman historians Tacitus and Pliny the Elder and by Claudius Ptolemy, under the name Veneti in the 1st and 2nd century AD. In the 6th century, Byzantine author Procopius and Gothic historian Jordanes mention them as Sclaveni. By this time, the Slavs already settled in the wide areas of central and eastern Europe, reaching lower and central Danube regions and invading Byzantine territories from Thrace, throughout Illyricum, up to Pannonia and Dalmatia.

De Administrando Imperio ("On the Governance of the Empire", DAI), compiled by the Byzantine Emperor Constantine VII Porphyrogenitus, mentions that the White Serbs relocated from the land of Bojka, also called the White Serbia. Historiography can't pinpoint for sure where that is, but the general consensus is that it was around the region of Bohemia (Boihaemum = Bojka) and Saxony.

After a death of the Serbian prince, his two sons took over the rule and divided White Serbs in two groups. One remained in White Serbia, while the other group migrated to the Balkans. Frankish Chronicle of Fredegar mentions Dervan, chieftain of the Serbs, in c. 631, who may be the first Serb mentioned by name in history. Dervan is considered to be the father or, more likely, brother of the nameless prince who led the White Serbs into the Balkans.

Sclaveni raided and settled the western Balkans in the 6th and 7th century. Jointly with the Antes, another Slavic group, they conducted intrusions south of the Danube and Sava rivers into the Balkans, and the territory of the Byzantine Empire ruled by Justinian I (527–565), who reconquered several former territories of the Roman Empire. The arrival of the Avars in the Pannonian Plain in 567 pushed the proper invasion raids. The Slavs followed the Avars in their, mostly destructive enterprises, into the Byzantine territory. They destroyed and conquered one by one city and fortress which constituted the Danubian Limes, northern border of the empire, like Sirmium (582) and Singidunum (modern Belgrade, 584). In 584 and 586 the Slavs already besieged Thessaloniki, on the Aegean Sea, raided Dalmatia in 597 while the entire limes collapsed by 602.

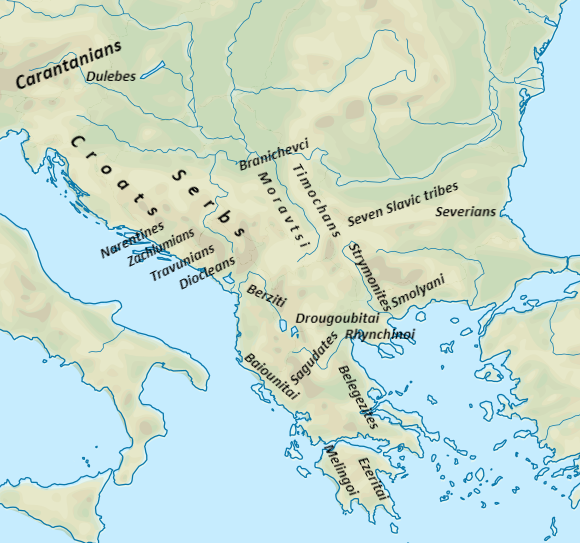
Approximate location of Slavic tribes in the Balkans

The decisive phase followed, mostly from 610 to 626, when the Slavs raided the inland of the Balkans, destroying large cities and ravaging the area between the Danube on the north and south of Greece, including the repeated sieges of Thessalonica in 616 and 618, and of Constantinople itself in 626. Only defeat at Constantinople stopped the raids and pacified the situation on the peninsula, but by that time large portions of the Balkans were already inhabited by the Slavs.

Around 640, the Avar-Slavic party raided the city of Salona on Dalmatian Adriatic coast, capturing Christian residents and numerous religious artifacts, including relics of the Saint Domnius and Saint Venantius of Salona. Pope John IV sent abbot Martin to buy off the prisoners and relics, whose account on the event survived. At the same time, citizens of the neighboring Spalatum complained to the "emperors in Constantinople" (Heraclius and his son Heraklonas) about the constant harassment by the Slavs, which prompted the emperors to issue an order to the "Goths and Slavs" to leave the town alone, which they complied to. The 8th century History of the Lombards by Paul the Deacon tells about the Slavic flotilla which attacked the town of Sipont in Italy in 642 (or 646). The Slavs arrived with "many ships", landed on the Gargano Promontory, close to Sipont, where they set their tent camp. They confronted the Lombards' duke Aiulf I, killing him. They were then approached by the Aiulf's adopted younger brother Radoald who "spoke their language", confusing the Slavs long enough to defeat them and expel them from the Apennine Peninsula.

Unlike some later attacks on modern Italian soil, it is unknown which specific Slavic tribe conducted this excursion. However, with some other data (Italian monks claim that Slavs acknowledged paramount rule of the Byzantine emperor), the well equipped attack on the Lombards, main opponents of the Byzantine Empire in Italy, points to the close connections between the Slavs and the Byzantines and the Byzantine overall influence, corroborating the DAIs claim that Serbs settled in the Balkans in accordance with the Byzantine emperor.

Through linguistical studies, it is concluded that the early South Slavs were made up of a western and eastern branch, of parallel streams, roughly divided in the Timok–Osogovo–Šar line.

Apart from the Serbs and the Croats, some of the Slavic tribes which settled the Balkan peninsula included:

Tribe	Serbian name (modern)	Regions	Modern states
Eastern Obotrites	Бодрићи (Bodrići)	Braničevo	Serbia
Braničevci	Браничевци (Braničevci)	Braničevo	Serbia
Baiounitai	Вајунити (Vajuniti)	Epirus	Albania, Greece
Belegezites	Велегезити (Velegeziti)	Thessaly	Greece
Berziti	Брсјаци (Brsjaci)	Lake Ohrid	North Macedonia
Drougoubitai	Драгувити (Draguviti)	North Macedonia	Bulgaria, Greece, North Macedonia
Ezeritai	Језерити (Jezeriti)	Central Peloponnese	Greece
Guduscani	Гачани (Gačani)	Lika-Dalmatia or Timok Valley	Croatia or Bulgaria-Serbia
Melingoi	Мелинзи (Melinzi)	East Peloponnese	Greece
Merehani	Морављани (Moravljani)	Morava Valley	Serbia
Rhynchinoi	Ринхини (Rinhini)	Central Macedonia	Greece, North Macedonia
Sagudates	Сагудати (Sagudati)	Southwest Macedonia, Thessaly	Greece
Severians	Северјани (Severjani)	Dobruja, Ludogorie	Bulgaria, Romania
Smolyani	Смољани (Smoljani)	Rhodope Mountains	Bulgaria, Greece
Strymonites	Струмљани (Strumljani)	East Macedonia	Bulgaria, Greece
Timočani	Тимочани (Timočani)	Timok Valley	Bulgaria, Serbia
Seven clans	Седам родова (Sedam rodova)	Danube Valley	Bulgaria, Romania

== Early Middle Ages ==
=== Archaeological evidence ===
According to archaeological evidence in Serbia, mainly along the Morava River Basin (which was settled by Bulgarian-Slavic tribes of Timočani, Eastern Obotrites and Moravians), the Slavs may have reached it earlier than thought, between late 6th and early 7th century, according to many findings of fibulae and Slavic pottery at Roman forts. However, "no grave has been found so far to be related to the Slavs with a degree of certainty" and "the date when the Slavs started settling in Illyricum remains a question". In the Danube Basin of Serbia (Vojvodina), thirteen sites show that the earliest presence of Slavs in that area could be dated to the late second half of the 6th century or later (with radiocarbon dating of 7–8th century), and possibly served as foederati protecting the Byzantine border fortresses. The sites have parallels with findings from both Central and Lower Danube and Sava Basin, with analogies showing that the southeastern part of Serbian Danube region most probably was settled by Slavs from Ipotești–Cândești culture.

The number of Slavic and Pannonian Avars findings in Serbia generally are very small, could be traces of warrior excursions or acculturation, and only since second half of the 7th century "can be interpreted with considerable certainty as a model of Slavic colonisation". However, the area was not well re-populated by the Slavs, and settlement patterns in the 8th and 9th century show "successive population inflows from the surrounding regions" (with significant Bulgarian influence). The findings indicating Slavic residence in Byzantine cities puts into question survival of local Roman population.

The found coins indicate "renewal of life in the central Balkans from the middle of the 7th to the middle of the 9th century". The settlements were unfortified and of small size, at the outskirts of ancient ramparts. Numerous finds give evidence to the conclusion that a good part of native Roman population remained and continued to live within and near those ramparts. After the Christianization, under influence of Byzantine and Bulgarian Empires, since the mid-9th century the settlements number increased and became fortified, also were re-settled ancient hillforts (more than 30%) but with reduced area size. No cemetery has been found, showing that the burial was mainly cremation and later biritual.

Outside of Serbia, in lands which were settled by early Serbs (and other Slavs), main remains of the Slavic culture and social organization, from the 7th to the 9th century, includes several localities around Doboj and in the Drina river valley, in modern Bosnia and Herzegovina, especially the large settlement near the village of Batković. The settlement had furnaces for the ore melting and smithing workshops. Serbian archaeologist Đorđe Janković considered that the Serbian Danube ornamental ceramic pots' analogies northwest of the Carpathian Basin (in Moravia and Austria) are evidence of the Serbian migration from the northwest to the Danube region with consent of the Byzantine Empire, but such hypothesis based on ceramics is not well substantiated as closer ceramic analogies exist in Lower Danube and Wallachian region.

=== Early Serbs ===
==== De Administrando Imperio on the Serbs ====
The history of the early medieval Serbian Principality is recorded in the DAI. The emperor Constantine VII Porphyrogenitus assembled it from 948 to 952 for his son and heir Romanos II. The aim was to warn the young prince on the problems which might occur during his reign. The Serbs are mentioned in the total of 8 chapters, from 29 to 36. The most important is the chapter 32, which is titled "About the Serbs and the lands in which they dwell today".

The DAI drew information on the Serbs from, among others, Serbian sources. On the origin of the Serbs, the DAI says that "Serbs originate from the unbaptized Serbs, also called White Serbs, which live on the other side of the Turkey (i.e. Hungary), in the land which they call Bojka, close to the Frankish Empire and the great Croatia, unbaptized, also known as the White Croatia".

The emperor also describes how the Serbian tribe was divided in two, with one group migrating to the Balkans:

As two brothers inherited the rule over the Serbs after their father, one of them, taking a half of the people with him, migrated over to Heraclius, emperor of the Romans, who took him in, and gave him the settling location in the Theme of Thessalonica, which is since then called Servia. But, after a while, those same Serbs decided to return to their [home]land and the emperor dispatched them. After they crossed the Danube, however, they changed their mind and sent out a note to the Emperor Heraclius, through the strategos of Singidunum, that they want him to give them another land to settle. And since the modern Serbia and Paganija and the so called land of Zachlumia and Travunija and the land of Konavle remained desolate because of the Avars (who expelled the Romans from there which now inhabits Dalmatia and Dyrrachium), the emperor settled Serbs in these lands, and they were subordinated to the emperor of the Romans, the emperor brought priests from Rome to baptize them and teach them to perform the pious duties in order, and displayed the Christian faith to them.

Another source on early medieval Serbia are the Royal Frankish Annals by Einhard, that recorded Serbs (in 822) who controlled great part of Dalmatia ("ad Sorabos, quae natio magnam Dalmatiae partem obtinere dicitur"). It was the oldest historical record which mentioned the name Serbs and gave some details about them.

In contemporary historiography and archaeology, the narratives of De Administrando Imperio have been reassessed as they contain anachronisms and factual mistakes. The account in DAI about the Serbs mentions that they requested from the Byzantine commander of present-day Belgrade to settle in the theme of Thessalonica, which was formed ca. 150 years after the reign of Heraclius which was in the 7th century. For the purposes of its narrative, the DAI formulates a mistaken etymology of the Serbian ethnonym which it derives from Latin servi (serfs).

The DAI mentioned that the Serbs from Polabia settled the Balkans during the reign of Emperor Heraclius (r. 610–641); however, some scholars consider that the Serbian tribe was not part of some later migration, as usually held by historiography, rather than migrating with the rest of early Slavs from Eastern Europe (with Đ. Janković theorizing even earlier presence of the Serbs and Antes in the Danube region).

==== Range of settling ====
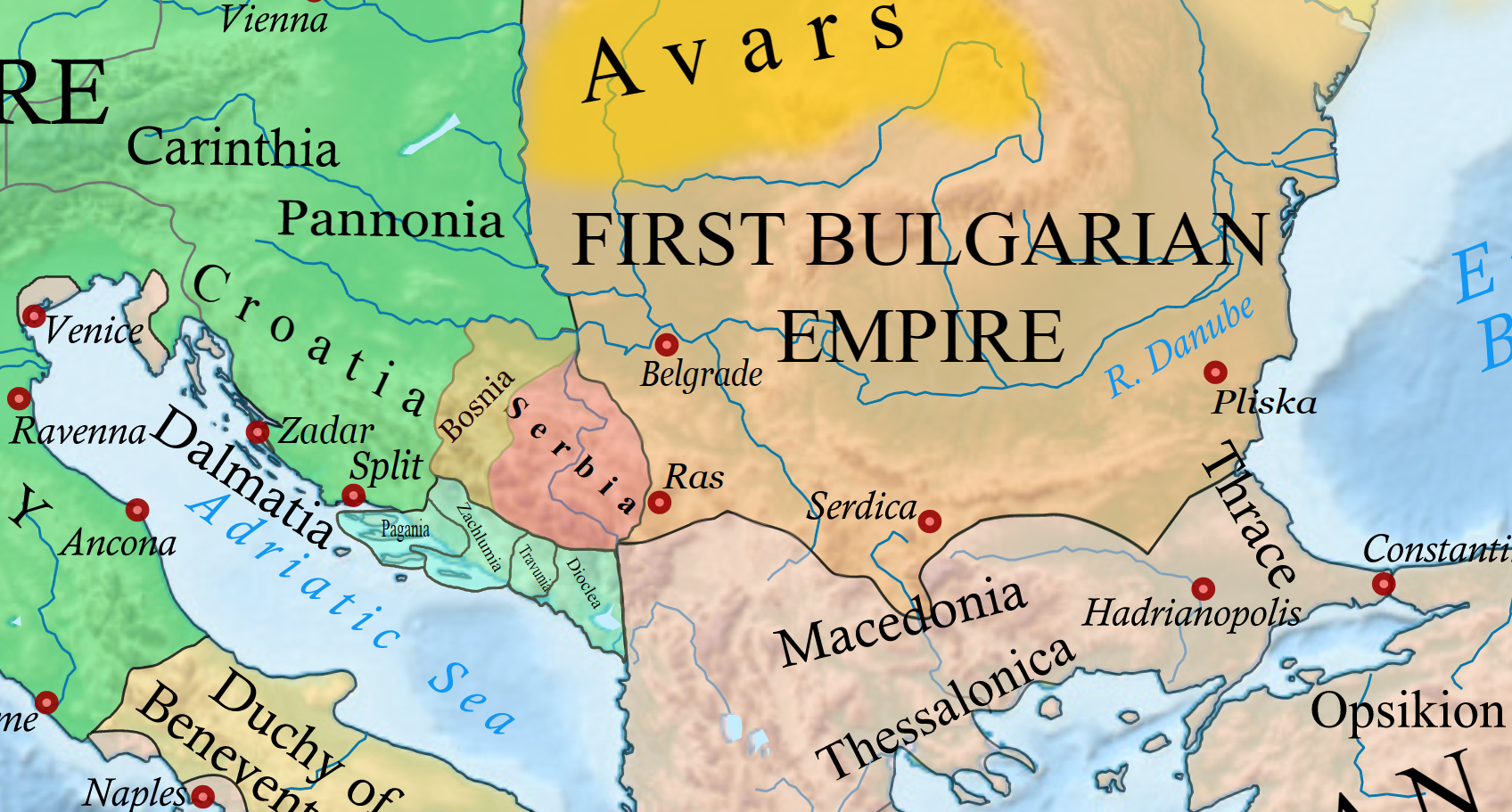
Principality of Serbia in 814

For the first two centuries after the settlement, from the early 7th century on, there are almost no historical records about the Serbs, and the region in general, as even in the entire Byzantine Empire almost no contemporary chronicles or historical works survived. But in this period the process of resettling of the Serbs in the central region of the peninsula was finished. They inhabited the narrow valleys in the watersheds of Lim, Tara, Piva, Ibar, West Morava, Upper Drina and Upper Bosna. Certain groups possibly crossed the Dinarides and reached the Adriatic coast, but a closer reading of the DAI suggests that Constantine VII's consideration about the Serbian ethnic identity of the population of Pagania, Travunia and Zachlumia is based on Serbian political rule and ethnic connection in the 10th century, neither a small group of people led by "Unknown Archon" could settle a large territory and they most probably arrived as a small military elite which managed to organize other already settled and more numerous Slavs.

Historical source which reappeared in the 9th century mention Serbs as a people "which is said to be holding the large part of Dalmatia", but Dalmatia in the Roman sense, as a region between the Adriatic on the south, the Sava on the north and the Drina (or Ibar) on the east, but according to John (Jr.) Fine, the presence of Serbs in this area is disputable since the Byzantine sources were limited to the southern coast, but it is possible that among other tribes existed a tribe or group of small tribes of Serbs. According to Živković, the usage of the term Dalmatia in the Royal Frankish Annals refers both to the land where Serbs ruled as well as to the lands under the rule of Croat duke, but doesn not necessarily mean settlement of the same area by the Serbs, and was likely a reflection of the Franks' territorial aspirations towards the entire area of the former Roman Province of Dalmatia. In the contemporary Vita Hludovici that description of the Serbs is omitted. Though the described borders mark a large area, it is mostly a mountainous and inaccessible terrain, rugged with the high ranges of the Dinarides. Within this region, the Serbs settled only a small, isolated and mutually distant river valleys, karst fields and fertile basins. Those patches of the territory had fertile land, suitable for the agriculture, while the barely accessible, some mountain regions remained uninhabited.

By the 7th century, the Serbs scattered all the way south to the Peloponnesus and other regions of Greece, while the emperor Heraclius originally settled them around Thessaloniki. However, the Serbs were not mentioned during first Siege of Thessalonica (617) and second Siege of Thessalonica (676–678), indicating the Serbs did not live in the area before and after that date. Emperor Justinian II possibly resettled some Serbs from the surroundings of Thessaloniki to Bithynia, in Asia Minor, in 688–689, and there they founded the town/district of Gordoservon. Among the participants of the Trullan Council, held in Constantinople in 692, bishop Isidore of Gordoserba was mentioned, which is the possibly first mention of the Serbian name in the south of Europe.

==== Christianization ====
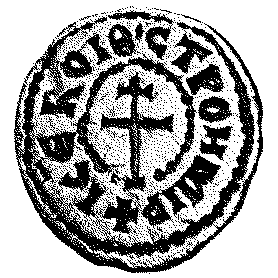
Seal of prince Strojimir, late 9th century

Prior to the migration to the south, while still living in the Polabian region, Serbs may be among the first Slavic people who came in contact with Christianity. In the 7th century, they became part of the Merovingian kingdom, which not only had Christianity as an official religion but also had a concept of spreading the religion. Though records mention no Christianization attempts toward the Serbs specifically, there are writings regarding the, more or less successful missionary attempts among the Bavarians and Thuringians, the neighboring Germanic tribes which were conquered by the Franks in the 6th century.

Though the DAI asserts that already during the reign of Emperor Heraclius the Serbs were Christianized and that the process was performed by the priests from Rome, it took some time before the new religion spread through the entire population. Other reports confirm that the church missionary activities were organized among the South Slavs already from the late 7th and mid-8th century. The process was mostly finished by the late 9th century during Byzantine Emperor Basil I which is when the first Christian names appear among the Serbs. Prince Mutimir, who ruled c. 850–891 named his son Stefan Mutimirović, while his nephew was named Petar Gojniković. Serbs who were relocated to Gordoserba in the Asia Minor were probably already Christianized by the end of the 7th century, as they had their bishop and were presumably part of the army of "selected peoples" (Christians) in 692.

From this period originates the seal of the prince Strojimir, Mutimir's brother. The seal has a representation of a cross and the inscription Lord, help Strojimir (ICE BOIΘ CTPOHMIP in Greek) around it. Pope John VIII addressed prince Mutimir in 873 and called in the letter for Mutimir that, "following the tradition of his ancestors", he submits his land to the jurisdiction of the new Pannonian bishop Methodius.

Numerous arguments point to the fact that the major role in the Christianization of the Serbs had priests and missionaries from Rome, rather than from the closer Constantinople. This can also be seen in the earliest Christian terms in the Serbian language which came from the Latin language (oltare from altare, altar), the earliest Christian toponymy and presence of several religious feasts and holidays which corresponded to the dates in the calendar of the Roman Catholic Church – St. Vitus' Day (Vidovdan), Michaelmas (Miholjdan), Theodore the Studite (Mratindan). Confirmation of the early missionary work by Rome, already in the 7th century, are writings of Pope Agatho and Thomas the Archdeacon. This wasn't unusual, as, following the ancient rules, this region of the still unified church was administered by Rome. This began to change after 732, when Byzantine emperor Leo III the Isaurian began to transfer regions and cities to the jurisdiction of the Ecumenical Patriarchate of Constantinople, including some parts of the Balkans. Despite this, the division wasn't as sharp as it will become after the East–West Schism in 1054.

The most important material testimony of the Christianization of the Serbs and other Slavs is the oldest known Christian temple among in Serbian lands, the Peter's Church in Ras, built in the 7–9th century. The oldest phase of the construction of the Church of Saint Apostles Peter and Paul in Bijelo Polje (Montenegro) was moved also to the 8th century after the recent re-examination of the construction works and stone ornaments, and was enhanced or finished in the 12th century. Remains of the 8th-century churches, before the Christianization process was finished, include localities of Bilimišće (Zenica, previously thought to be late-Roman church from the 5th or the 6th century), Dabravine (Visoko), Mali Mošunj (Vitez), Lepenica (Kiseljak), but also in the vicinities of Stolac, Ljubuški, Livno, Glamoč, Foča, Breza (all in modern Bosnia) and Imotski (Croatia). However, though active during this period, many of them may be pre-Slavic, Roman churches.

Either through the missionary works of Roman or Byzantine monks, local remnants of the Romanized people or the Byzantine population in the cities, the Christianization of the Serbs appears to be peaceful and voluntary, unlike the forceful practices of the Frankish Empire. Apart from the political implications – use of new religion for the strengthening of the central rule and concentration of the power in the hands of the ruler – there was also a cultural and spiritual dimension, which included acceptance of the basic cultural values and principles of the day, and the church was the founding stone of literacy and education in the Middle Age societies. The entire religious-cultural process spanned through three centuries.

=== First Serbian polities ===
==== Initial organization ====
In those small, isolated areas, the Serbs formed their basic territorial and political units. Each unit comprised a small geographical area, usually a river valley or a basin with the villages in it, bounded by the surrounding hills. The unit was called župa and the local chieftain who administered it was called župan. Župans, in turn, were subordinated to the knez or prince (archon, ἄρχων in Greek; dux in Latin). The knez was the supreme elder and ruler of the entire people while župans were intermediaries between him and the people. As in the other parts of the early medieval Europe, Serbian "state" did not mean by default a rule over the territory, but over the people. So, the Serbian political organization included only areas which were populated by the Serbs, excluding the vast uninhabited areas in between. That way, the borders of the "state" cannot be accurately determined.

==== Principality of Serbia ====
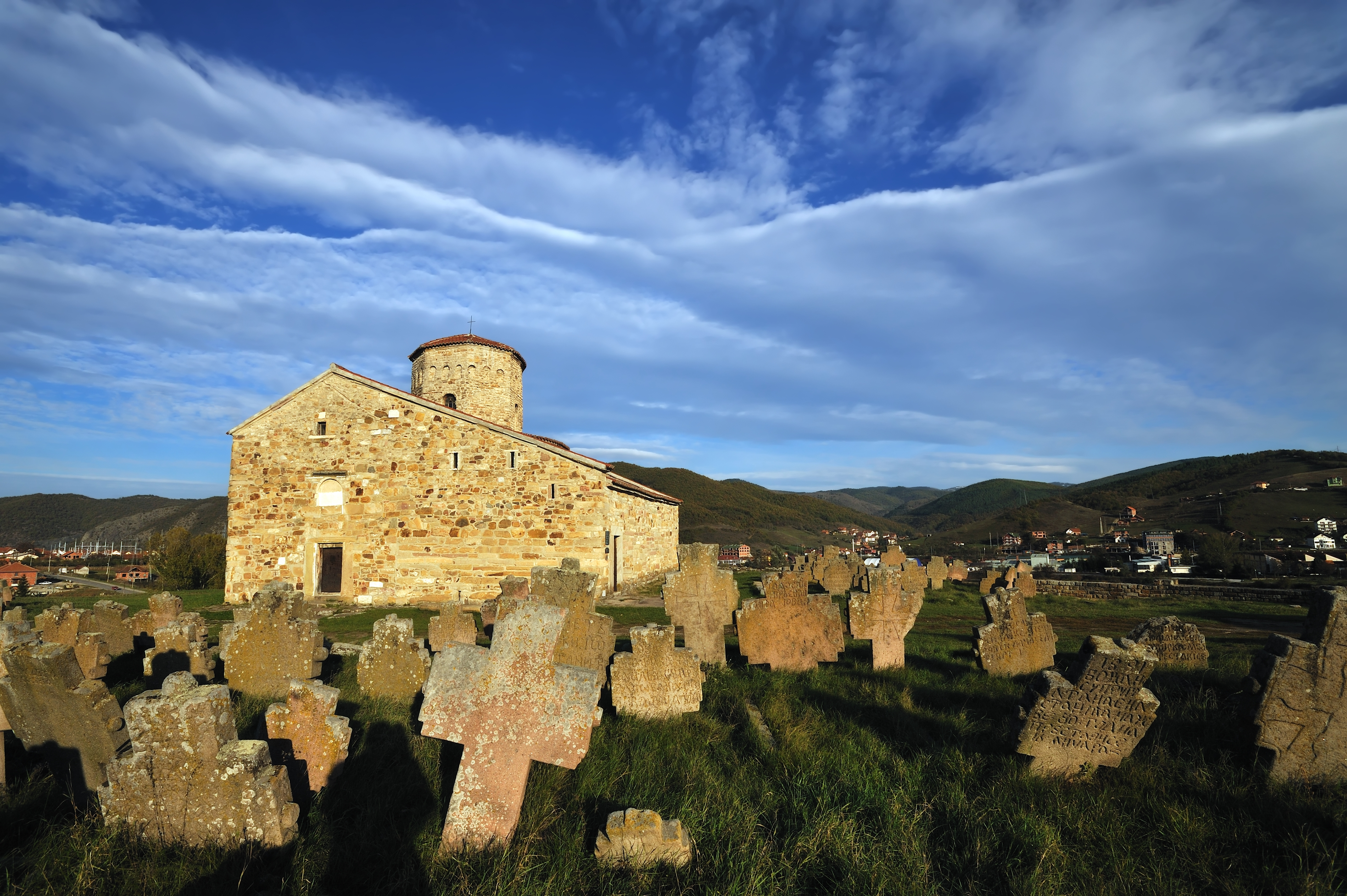
Church of the Holy Apostles Peter and Paul in Stari Ras, 9th century

According to DAI, "baptized Serbia" (known in historiography also as Raška), included the inhabited cities (καστρα/kastra) of Destinikon (or Serbian Dostinika) (Δεστινίκον), Tzernabouskeï (Τζερναβουσκέη), Megyretous (Μεγυρέτους), Dresneïk (Δρεσνεήκ), Lesnik (Λεσνήκ), Salines (Σαληνές), while the "small land" (χοριον/chorion) of Bosnia (Βοσωνα), part of Serbia, had the cities of Katera (Κατερα) and Desnik (Δέσνηκ). Almost all of them, apart Salines and possibly Destinikon, are still unidentified. Serbian towns could have been located more to the eastern or western border, with the latter being a more probable localization. They were not mentioned afterwards, possibly because of remote location, lost importance or desolation after Bulgarian Samuel's conquest in the end of the 10th century. It is considered that Destinikon was the ecclesiastical centre and capital of early medieval Serbia. There is no scholarly consensus as to whether Stari Ras was located on the Serbian or Bulgarian side of the border, but newer research indicates that since the mid-9th century, Ras was renovated, inhabited and controlled by the Bulgarians and therefore "a frontier district of Bulgaria".

The ruling princely line originated from the first archon who led the Serbs to the Balkans during the emperor Heraclius' reign. However, by the time of the emperor Constantine VII Porphyrogenitus, the names of those early princes faded from the collective memory. In the DAI, the emperor basically gives the genealogy of the first Serbian ruling dynasty: After the "Unknown Archon" of the Serbs who fled over to the emperor Heraclius, in the time when Bulgaria was under the rule of the Romans, by the inheritance (rules) his son took over the rule, then his grandson and so other archons from his family line. After a number of years, Višeslav was born who fathered Radoslav, who fathered Prosigoj, who fathered Vlastimir.

There are no dates in this genealogy, but some can be extrapolated. The first archon arrived during the 610–626 period, and died (long time?) before the Bulgar invasion which occurred in 680. Historian Konstantin Jireček in his History of the Serbs I, page 69, estimates the rule of Višeslav, the first Serbian ruler whose name is known, around 780. One of his two successors was in power in 822, as mentioned in the Royal Frankish Annals. The work deals with an episode concerning the Pannonian ruler Ljudevit Posavski. Under the Frankish attack he left his capital Sisak and fled over to the Serbs, for which is "said to be as holding the large part of (Roman) Dalmatia": Siscia civitate relicta, ad Sorabos, quae natio magnam Dalmatiae partem obtinere dicitur, fugiendo se contulit. However, the mentioning of "Dalmatia" in 822 and 833 as an old geographical term by the authors of Frankish Annals was Pars pro toto with a vague perception of what this geographical term actually referred to. In the contemporary Vita Hludovici that description of the Serbs is omitted. Ljudevit later killed the local župan who took him in and temporarily took over the rule in his župa, which is estimated to be either somewhere in western, central or eastern Bosnia. Some historians pointed to the modern village of Srb in the region of Lika in modern Croatia, as the possible location as in the medieval period it was a town, described in the early 14th century as having "Serbian seat and court, like in the old times", while others opposed it. Frankish chronicle makes a distinctions between the settlements ruled by the Croats (referring to them as castellis, or castles) and those held by the Serbs (civitas, or city-states). Ljudevit then fled to the Croatian domain, but was soon murdered. During the 822 uprising, Serbs supported the rebellion, thus siding against the Frankish Empire and indirectly supporting the Byzantines, but it is unknown to which extent they participated in the skirmishes between two empires in the 8th and the 9th century.

===== War periods =====
In 680 the Bulgars settled on the Balkans and allied with the more numerous Slavs living in the region, forming an independent and well organized political entity, the First Bulgarian Empire in 681. The major expansion of Bulgaria began in the first half of the 9th century when they attacked Constantinople and conquered numerous Slavic tribes on the Balkans (Guduscani, doubtful, and Timočani, which fled to the Frankish controlled areas in the west, Praedenecenti in c. 825, Merehani – all of which disappeared from history afterwards), so as the remnants of the Avars in the Pannonian plain. By acquiring the Morava Valley and Belgrade, they came in contact with the Serbs. Because of the ensuing Bulgarian-Serbian relations, the reign of prince Vlastimir can be determined with greater certainty. According to the DAI, Presian I, Khan of Bulgaria, attacked the Serbs during his reign (Bulgar–Serb War (839–842)) to "subdue them". Unlike the tribes on the east, Vlastimir decided to stand the ground and not to lead Serbs to the west. Aside from the Bulgarians, he was surrounded by the Franks on the entire north, west and southwest side, including the vassal Zachlumia. He tried to strengthen his position by connecting with the subordinated Travunija, marrying his daughter into Travunija's ruling family. However, after the three years-long warfare, Presian didn't gain any territories and, additionally, lost the majority of its army.

Vlastimir died c. 850 and Presijan in 852. Serbian throne was inherited by Vlastimir's sons, Mutimir, Strojimir and Gojnik. According to the conventional inheritance rules of the period, the state was probably administratively divided in three, but Mutimir held the "ruling right" as the eldest one. Presian's son and successor, Boris I of Bulgaria, decided to avenge his father, and attacked Serbia again, instigating the Bulgar–Serb War of 853, though the warfare is variously set by the historians in 854, 858, 863–864, 870 or even in the 880s. The war was also part of the larger skirmish in the region, which included the Bulgarian expansion in the direction of the central Danube Valley and the Byzantine efforts to weaken the Bulgarian-Frankish alliance against the Great Moravia and cultural turning of the Bulgarians to Rome. The Serbian army led by Mutimir and his brothers was again victorious, capturing the leader of the Bulgarian army, and Boris' son and heir, Vladimir of Bulgaria and 12 boyars. This pressured Boris to reluctantly agree to a peace treaty. As a guarantee that his son and the others will be freed, Boris asked for the Mutimir's sons to accompany the prisoners to the border. Mutimir sent his two younger sons, Bran and Stefan, while the eldest and heir to the throne, Pribislav, was precautionary kept at home. Pleased with the release of his son, Boris gave them "lush gifts", while the Serbian princes gave to Boris "two slaves, two falcons, two dogs, and 80 furs".

Soon after the peace was reached with Bulgaria, the internal strife hit the ruling triumvirate. Mutimir, eldest and probably the most powerful in the state, expelled his brothers Strojimir (and his son Klonimir) and Gojnik to khan Boris in Bulgaria, keeping only Petar Gojniković, Gojnik's son and his nephew. This happened between 863 and 873, when the pope John VIII in his letter addressed Mutimir only. However, Petar soon fled to Croatia. Strojimir remained in Bulgarian exile for the rest of his life. Boris married him to a Bulgarian noblewoman and they had a son, Časlav Klonimirović.

Mutimir's eldest son, Pribislav, succeeded to the throne after his father's death in 891. This was an opportunity for the descendants of the Mutimir's brothers to take over the Serbian throne. Already in 892 Petar Gojniković returned from Croatia, expelled all three Mutimir's sons to Croatia – Pribislav, Bran and Stefan – and began his rule which lasted until 917. In this period he suppressed two attempts for his dethronement. Petar defeated and blinded Bran who tried to overthrow him in 895 attacking from Croatia while in 897 he crushed Klonomir's attempt from Bulgaria to depose him. Klonimir, probably instigated by the Bulgarians, managed to briefly capture the city of Dostinika, but was ultimately defeated and killed by Peter.

During his reign, Petar kept good relations with both the Byzantine emperor Leo VI the Wise (ruled 886–912) and the emperor Simeon I of Bulgaria, second son of late emperor Boris, (893–927). He was connected with Simeon by the peace treaty but also with the custom of kumstvo. Strains between Bulgarian and Byzantine empires resulted in the Byzantine–Bulgarian war of 894–896, which was continued as the Byzantine–Bulgarian war of 913–927. This affected Serbia a lot. One of the most important moments in this second war was the Battle of Anchialus, held on 20 August 917, when Simeon defeated the Byzantines. Peter apparently leaned on the Byzantine side. Right before the battle, on the bank of the Neretva river, he met with Leo Rhabdouchos, Byzantine strategos of Dyrrachium. Michael Višević, ruler of Zachlumia, who held good personal relations with Simeon, dispatched this to the Bulgarian emperor, accusing Petar of collusion with the Byzantines. He also reported that the Byzantines are bribing Peter for him to cooperate with the Hungarians in the joint attack against Bulgaria. This was used by Simeon to start the Bulgarian–Serbian wars of 917–924. Bulgarian army which attacked Serbia was headed by Pavle Branović, son of blinded Bran. Despite that safety was granted to Petar because of his close relations with Simeon, he was captured and sent to Bulgaria where he died imprisoned, while Pavle became the new ruler by the end of 917.

At the beginning, Pavle ruled as a Bulgarian protégé. This prompted the new Byzantine emperor, Romanos I Lekapenos, to organize a party in 921 to overthrow Pavle. The campaign was headed by Pribislav's son, Zaharija Pribislavljević, who lived in Constantinople at the time, in the Romanos' court. He was defeated and Pavle sent him to Bulgaria as a prisoner. In 923 Pavle turned against his sponsors, the Bulgarians, so Zaharija was again dispatched against him, now by Simeon. This time he was successful, expelling Pavle and taking over the rule himself. But Zaharija soon switched back to his original allies, the Byzantines. Simeon sent an army to conquer the shifty archon. His troops, headed by Theodore Sigritsa and Marmais attacked the Serbs in 924, but were defeated. Both commanders were killed and their heads, so as the confiscated weapons, were sent to the Byzantine emperor as the trophies. Later that year Simeon sent much larger army. Among the soldier was Klonimir's son, Časlav Klonimirović. In front of the much larger Bulgarian army, Zaharija fled to Croatia.

===== Final years =====
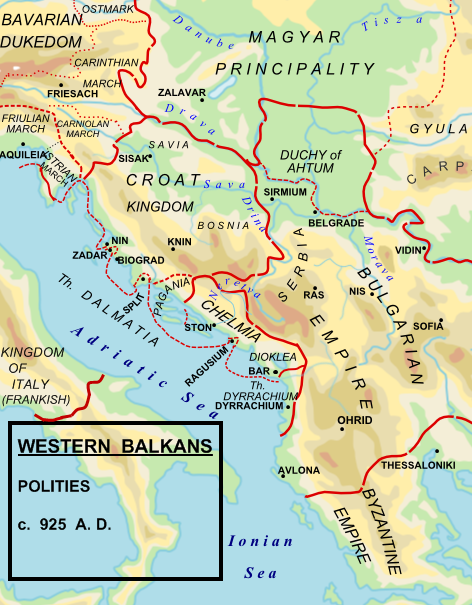
Serbian lands in the early 10th century

The Bulgarian Empire summoned Serbian župans to gather and accept Časlav as the new archon, but they were all captured and sent to Bulgaria. In the next few years, 925 and 926, Bulgarians completely ravaged Serbia. Part of the population was enslaved and taken to Bulgaria, while some managed to escape to Croatia or to the Byzantine Empire. According to Constantine VII Porphyrogenitus, the "country was left deserted". But situation changed after Simeon I the Great died in 927. His son and heir, Peter I of Bulgaria, changed completely the politics of his country, falling under the heavy Byzantine influence. This allowed for Časlav, who returned to live in Bulgarian capital Preslav as Serbia was turned into the badlands, to come to Serbia and restore the state. This happened "7 years later", but historians are not sure is it 7 years after the 924 expedition to Serbia or after 927 and Simeon's death, but it had to be by 933–934, at latest. DAI claims that he and his entourage of 4 encountered only "50 single men, without wives and children, who lived from hunting", it shows how thorough the destruction of Serbian state and society was by the Bulgarians, considered that "at this point, fortifications were temporarily abandoned".

Časlav recognized the supreme authority of the Byzantine emperor Constantine VII Porphyrogenitus, who became his mentor and protector. The emperor helped Časlav to restore Serbia, including the heavy financial aid. Časlav repopulated Serbia returning some of the people who fled to the neighboring countries. Serbia prospered, keeping good relations with the Byzantines and the emperor constantly pointed out the good relations with Serbia in this period. The borders of Časlav's state are uncertain, possibly expanding into Bosnia. It is presumed his reign stopped or died in the 940s.

According to semi-fictional late 13th century Chronicle of the Priest of Duklja, a Hungarian local nobleman Kisa attacked a domain in Bosnia of certain Ciaslavus (Časlav) with which some scholars identify Časlav from DAI, but it is highly disputable. Supporting scholars date the event, known as the Magyar–Serb conflict, sometime between 950 and 960.

Časlav's death in the 940s or 960s marked the end of some 350 years of the Vlastimirović dynasty rule, the oldest Serbian ruling dynasty, which was unusually long for the period and the region. All early dynasties, so as the Vlastimirović dynasty which ruled Serbia c. 610-c. 960, are named by the modern historians, either after their progenitors or the most prominent members.

==== Other polities ====
The other principalities that were more or less under Serbian political influence include Paganija, Zahumlje, Travunija and Duklja. These polities bordered Serbia to the north, but the exact borders of the early Serbian state are unclear. The Serbian ruler was titled "Prince (archon) of the Serbs" (αρχων Σερβλίας). The DAI mentions that the Serbian throne is inherited by the son, i.e. the first-born; his descendants succeeded him, though their names are unknown until the coming of Višeslav.

It is possible that there were two names used for the Serbs in this period. A general one, depicting the descendants of the first settlers while the other was a regional one. By the 11th century, most of the regional names disappeared and were replaced by the ethnonym Serbs. In his work Strategikon of Kekaumenos, the 11th century Byzantine general Katakalon Kekaumenos refers to the duke of Duklja Stefan Vojislav as both "Dioclean" and "Travunian Serbian". John Skylitzes, a historian from the same period, calls Stefan Vojislav an "archon of the Serbs" and that he took over the "land of the Serbs".

Duklja

The region of Duklja (Dioclea) stretched along the Adriatic coast from Bay of Kotor to the mouth of the Drin river, excluding the major seaside towns like Lezhë, Ulcinj and Bar, which remained under the Byzantine rule. It occupied the central regions of Zeta nad Morača, and, like Travunija and Zachlumia, on its northern, mountainous side, leaned on the central Serbian state under the Vlastimirović dynasty, referred to as the Baptized Serbia by Constantine VII Porphyrogenitus. On the south, it bordered the Byzantine Empire in the direction of Dyrrachium, a Slavic/Serbian-Byzantine border which constantly changed for several centuries.

Travunia

The region of Travunija was situated in the hinterland of Dubrovnik and the Bay of Kotor, encompassing the fertile župa of Konavle. It had 5 towns: Trebinje, Vrm, Rhizon, Lukavete and Zetlivi. The polity was given some autonomy during the rule of Vlastimir. Archon Vlastimir also had a daughter, who, although without a recorded name, was the first mentioned Serbian woman in history. Vlastimir married her to Krajina, the son of Beloje, župan of Travunija and later awarded his son-in-law the title of knez. Krajina's heirs Hvalimir and Čučimir also used the same title. In the DAI, emperor Constantine writes that "the archons of Travunija were always under the rule of archons of Serbia".

After 867, when Basil I the Macedonian became Byzantine emperor, the Arabs in the southern Italy attacked the Dalmatian cities, including Dubrovnik. The citizens asked for Byzantine help so the emperor sent the ships headed by Niketas Ooryphas, the Droungarios of the Fleet. He forced the Arabs into retreat and made them quit the blockade, thus reinstating the Byzantine maritime control in the Adriatic after several decades. This allowed for the Byzantines to use the local inhabitants from the Croatian and Serbian lands as the auxiliary naval detachments in the ensuing Byzantine-Frankish siege of the Arabic Bari in 870–871. It was recorded that various Slavic people participated on ships dispatched by the Ragusans: Croats, Serbs, Zahumlians, Travunians, Kanalites. The Byzantines ravaged the Adriatic coast then, setting administrative and political relations in the region, ordering for the towns and islands of Split, Trogir, Zadar, Cres, Rab and Krk to pay tribute to the Croatian state, and to Ragusa to pay tribute to the Serbian states of Zachlumia and Travunija.

Zachlumia

The region of Zachlumia occupied the lower Neretva region, between the upper Neretva on the north (Baptized Serbia), the Narentians (on the west) and Adriatic coast, to Dubrovnik. There were 5 cities in the polity (Ston, Mokriskik, Josliu, Galumainik and Dobriskik), of which only the location of Ston is known as the settlement still exists, located in Croatia today.

After Bulgarian emperor Simeon began to crush Serbia in 925 and 926, his ally up to that point, Michael Višević of Zachlumia, changed his political orientation. In 925, he was present at the Council of Split which dealt with the church organization in the Croatian and Serbian lands, and in the Dalmatian cities. In 926, as a Byzantine ally, Michael conducted a bold navy attack on the town of Siponto in southern Italy in an effort to strengthen his connections with the court in Constantinople. The emperor awarded to him the titles of anthypatos and patrikios.

Narentines (Pagania)

The region of Narentines occupied the area between the Neretva and Cetina rivers, and consisted of three župas, Rastoc and Mokro on the coast, and Dalen, in the hinterland. The first two had fleets, while the third was agricultural. The Narentines also held islands of Mljet, Korčula, Brač and Hvar, left vacant by the Romanized population, but inhabited by the Narentines who kept herds there. They weren't Christianized with the rest of the Serbian tribes, hence the Greeks called them Pagans. Venetian chronicler John the Deacon mentions the visit of the Narenties party to Venice in c. 830, which were still not Christianized, so they were baptized in Venice. The accord reached between the Narentines and Venetians wasn't lasting, as in 835 the Narentines again started to attack Venetian merchants and missionaries. Venetian dodge Pietro Tradonico sent fleet in 839 to the Balkan coast of the Adriatic, reaching peace with duke Mislav of the Dalmatian Croatia, and alliance (foedus) with Družak, Narentine chieftain. This didn't last either, and next year the dodge sent another fleet, but was defeated by the Narentines.

Paganija was mentioned as being subordinated to Serbia during the reign of archon Petar. However, the polity took a more independent course later. The DAI says that the Cetina river marked the extension of Paganija but that the river was also border of Croatia and Serbia, placing Paganija under the rule of prince Časlav Klonimirović, or the Baptized Serbia. He also said that the 917 meeting between prince Petar Gojniković and Byzantine strategos of Dyrrachium, Leo Rhabdouchos, occurred in Paganija, which was "under Serbian rule". However, Paganija was probably more often than not outside of the suzerainty of the Baptized Serbia. With further changes of the borders (Croatia, Zachlumia) and shifting influences (Venetians, Byzantines), Paganija was physically cut off from the central Serbian state.

Bosnia

Bosnia was mentioned for the first time in the DAI (χωριον βοσονα, small land of Bosnia), as a region of Baptized Serbia. The 12th century Byzantine historian John Kinnamos for events dated to 1149 describes that the Drina river "divides Bosnia from the rest of Serbia. Bosnia itself is not subject to the Serbs's Grand Župan, but is a tribe which lives and is ruled separately", and to 1155 mentions the Bosnian ban Borić exarch of Bosnia "a Serbian region, who was enrolled among the Hungarian ruler's allies".

=== Restored Byzantine dominance ===
It is not known who inherited prince Časlav, or what were the circumstances in Serbia in this period. With the death of Časlav in c. 940s-c. 960s and Constantine VII Porphyrogenitus in 959, information about area of the former Vlastimirović Serbia faded. When the new Byzantine emperor John I Tzimiskes effectively crushed Bulgarian empire in 971, the Byzantine ("Roman") paramount rule stretched to the Danube again, for the first time in over three centuries. That way, Serbian lands came under the direct governance of the Byzantine Empire. Many coin hoards which were found show continuous conflicts between Byzantines, Bulgarians and Serbs in the end of 10th and early 11th century.

At first, instead of the local prince, central Serbia was organized as the Catepanate of Ras, and ruled by the Byzantine administrator. He had a high rank of katepano (or dux) and was seated in Ras. However, this situation didn't last long, as soon after John I Tzimiskes died in 976, the Cometopuli rebellion broke in the central Balkans restoring for a while Bulgarian state. The ensuing, decades old wars of the Byzantine conquest of Bulgaria placed Serbs in a difficult position. There are records of the 991–992 Serbian delegation which travelled by sea to meet the Byzantine emperor Basil II The Bulgar-Slayer. It is believed that this delegation came from some of the Serbian maritime states. In this period, it was recorded that the rule of Jovan Vladimir, ruler of maritime Duklja in c. 1000, stretched over the "areas of Serbia".

With the defeat of Bulgaria in 1018 and the death of their emperor Ivan Vladislav, the Byzantines used the anarchy and confusion in the Serbian lands and again restored the direct Byzantine rule. Central Serbia was organized as the new military-administrative province of Theme Serbia, administrated by the strategos. Duklja was subordinated to the Dux of Dyrrachium, while the situation in Travunia is obscure as there are no surviving records. Local Serbian princes remained in power in Zachlumia, but they were integrated into the established Byzantine administrative order. For example, Prince Ljutovid was given the Byzantine title of protospatharios epi tou Chrysotriklinou (literally, "first sword-bearer") and at some point was appointed the strategos of Serbia and Zachlumia.

== High Middle Ages ==
=== Vojislavljević dynasty ===
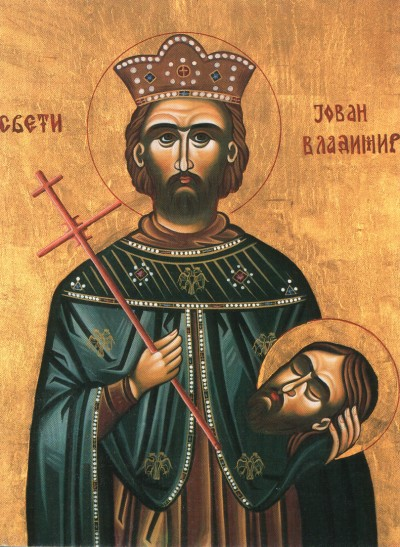
Icon of prince Jovan Vladimir, the first canonized Serb

Duklja was a medieval Serb state which roughly encompassed the territories of present-day southeastern Montenegro, from the Bay of Kotor in the west to the Bojana river in the east, and to the sources of the Zeta and Morača rivers in the north. It was first mentioned in the 10th century Byzantine chronicles, which remain the most important sources on Duklja's history in the 11th and 12th century: John Skylitzes, Skylitzes Continuatus, Katakalon Kekaumenos and Anna Komnene in her work The Alexiad. Constantine VII Porphyrogenitus doesn't give any data on the rulers of Duklja. A lead seal from the 9th or the 10th century points to a certain "Prince Peter of Duklja" but there are no other data on him.

Duklja's prince, Jovan Vladimir, was captured by the Bulgarians during the 998–999 attempt by the Emperor Samuil to conquer Duklja. Jovan Vladimir then married Samuil's relative Theodora Kosara (in the early chronicles she was described as Samuil's daughter) and was allowed to return to Duklja and rule as Bulgarian vassal. Jovan Vladimir maintained good relations with the Byzantines, too, which may led to his demise. After Samuil's death in 1014, his son and successor Gavril Radomir was assassinated by his cousin Ivan Vladislav in 1015. On 22 May 1016, Ivan Vladislav who was also a cousin-in-law of Jovan Vladimir, assassinated Jovan Vladimir in front of the church in the town of Prespa. Because of his pious life and martyr's death, Jovan Vladimir was the first Serb who became a saint, while the Byzantine sources described him as a "just man, peaceful and full of virtue".

Jovan Vladimir was succeeded by his paternal uncle Dragimir, a local prince, who died in 1018. Dragimir was succeeded by his son Stefan Vojislav, who is in the Byzantine sources variously labeled as a Serb, Travunian or Dukljan. His mother was a daughter of Ljutomir (or possibly, Ljutovid), the ruler of Serbia. Stefan Vojislav was born in Brusno, in the župa of Drina, shortly after his father died. The origin of this ruling line is obscured in proper historical records, so some historians believe they are branch of the Travunian princely line.

==== Rise ====
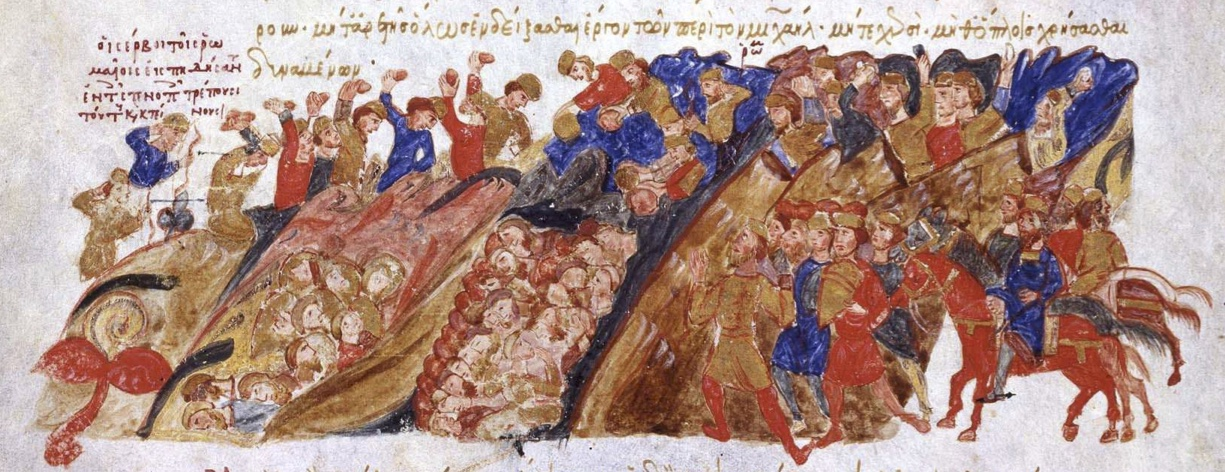
Serbs massacre the Byzantines in the mountain passes, 12th-century Madrid Skylitzes

After the collapse of the Bulgaria in 1018, Duklja became a vassal of the Byzantine Empire, but soon after the death of emperor Romanos III Argyros in 1034, Stefan Vojislav rebelled against the Byzantines. However, the rebellion was extinguished in 1036 and Stefan Vojislav was captured and taken to Constantinople. The direct Byzantine rule in Serbia was restored and the new strategos of Serbia was general Theophilos Erotikos. Stefan Vojislav escaped from his captivity in 1037 or 1038, returned to Serbia by 1039, expelled Theophilos and then expanded the territory under his rule capturing Duklja and the "Illyiran Coast" (cities of Bar, Ulcinj and Scutari), which belonged to the Byzantine Theme of Dyrrhachium. He also began to attack and plunder the imperial ships on the Adriatic in the winter of 1039–1040. This prompted the next emperor, Michael IV the Paphlagonian (ruled 1034–1041), to send an expedition against Stefan Vojislav in the spring of 1040, under the command of eunuch Georgios Provatas. Provatas was heavily defeated: "arriving in the country and entering deep into the gorges, ravines and trackless lands, he lost his entire army, barely saving himself".

This encouraged Stefan Vojislav who continued to expand the state and to provoke Byzantine allies. New emperor Constantine IX Monomachos (ruled 1042–1055) sent a new expedition in the fall of 1042. The army was dispatched immediately after the observation of the comet on 6 October 1042. Numbering 40,000 to 60,000 soldiers, the imperial army was headed by Michael, dux of Dyrrhachium. Michael was initially successful. He entered deeply into the Stefan Vojislav's state, amassing lots of "plunder and captives" and decided to return. However, Stefan Vojislav organized an ambush in the ravines of the Rumija mountain. The attack began when the Serbs buried the Byzantines under the massive storm of stones and arrows, throwing them from the mountains above, using all possible sorts of launching weapons. Michael managed to survive, but lost 40,000 soldiers and 7 strategos. By winning this combat, which became known as the Battle of Bar, Stefan Vojislav suppressed Byzantine rule in this part of the Balkans and solidified his position as the ruler of the unified Serbian state which, for the first time since the migration, encompassed four (out of five) historical principalities: Serbia (Duklja, Travunia, Zachlumia, and stretched between the rivers of Neretva and Bojana). However, Stefan Vojislav officially kept, albeit merely symbolical, vassal relation to the Byzantine Empire.

==== Kingdom ====
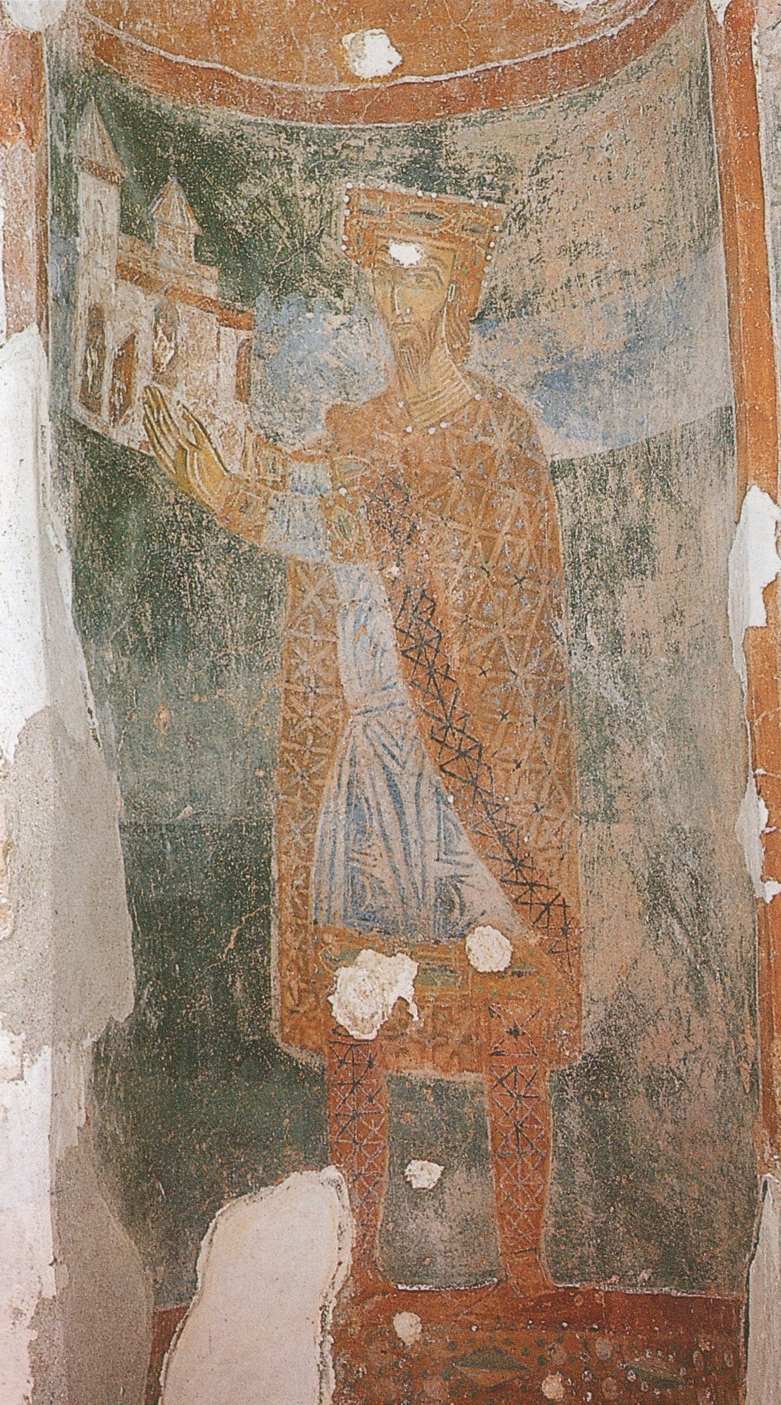
Fresco of king Mihailo I

In the mid-1040, Stefan Vojislav died and was succeeded by one of his sons, Mihailo Vojislavljević. New prince signed a treaty with the emperor Constantine IX Monomachos in c. 1053 and was granted the title of protospatharios. Though the title wasn't particularly high, it was given to the imperial governors which shows that the symbolic vassal relations were still kept. Good relations between Duklja and Constantinople lasted until the 1070s. After the massive defeat by the Seljuks at the Battle of Manzikert in 1071 and general discontent with the rule of new emperor Michael VII Doukas, the Byzantine Empire abruptly weakened and the internal strife and riots broke.

In September 1072 a rebellion by the Bulgarian nobility from Skoplje, headed by Georgi Voyteh, broke in the Byzantine Theme of Bulgaria. The rebellion leaders asked Mihailo for help, and he obliged, sending a company of 300 soldiers, headed by his son Constantine Bodin and a commander Vojvoda Petrilo. The allied Bulgarian-Serbian forces gathered in Prizren, where Bodin was proclaimed a Bulgarian emperor and given the name Petar, after the Bulgarian emperor Petar I, son of emperor Simeon. The Byzantine imperial army was sent to crush the rebellion, but they were heavily defeated ("horrific battle and even more horrific defeat of the Romans"). Heads of the Byzantine attacking forces, Damian Dalassenos and Lombard mercenary Longibardopoulos, were captured. After this victory and conquest of Skoplje, Bodin split his army in two. He took the command over the group which headed north. towards Niš, while Petrilo headed the other group which went south, to Ohrid, Devol and Kastoria. Petrilo was defeated at Kastoria, while Bodin managed to conquer Niš. Upon the call from Voyteh, Bodin returned to re-conquer Skopje which was retaken by the new imperial army sent from Constantinople, but he was intercepted, defeated and captured in December 1072 by the Byzantines at Taonios (later Pauni field). Mihailo sent new regiments to save his son, but they failed. Longibardopoulos, who was taken by Mihailo to his court and even married Mihailo's daughter, was leading one of those rescue missions which consisted of Serbian and Lombard soldiers, but he betrayed his brother-in-law Bodin and switched back to the Byzantine side at Taonios. Bodin was taken to Constantinople and imprisoned in the Saint Sergius Monastery before being moved to Antioch. Mihailo bribed a group of Venetian merchants who saved Bodin from imprisonment and returned him to Duklja. Bodin's participation in the rule of Duklja wasn't mention before, but after his return, the sources say that Mihailo "restored his previous rule", so Bodin apparently was a co-ruler before 1072.

During this period of breaking ties with the Byzantines, Mihailo turned to Rome. As the time, Pope Gregory VII was involved in the Investiture controversy with Holy Roman Emperor Henry IV, so they both searched for allies throughout Europe. In this vein, the pope granted the royal title of king to Demetrius Zvonimir of Croatia in 1075 and to Mihailo in 1076 or 1077, as in a letter from 9 January 1078, the pope addresses Mihailo as the King of the Slavs (Michaeli Sclavorum regi) This makes Mihailo the first Serbian ruler ever officially proclaimed a king and he was depicted as a king on the fresco from the Church of Saint Michael, his endowment in Ston. In diplomatic ways of the day, this also meant Duklja was internationally recognized as an independent state. This recognition was soon acknowledged by the Byzantine Empire which referred to Mihailo's successor Bodin as exousiastes (as for some other foreign sovereigns), instead of archon, though never referred in that way to Mihailo.

Serbian polities (in green) in the late 11th century

Mihailo continued to co-rule with his son Bodin until the mid-1081. After this period, only Bodin is mentioned. For a while, relations with the Byzantine Empire were good again. Historian Anna Komnene wrote that emperor Alexios I Komnenos "made Bodin and Mihailo, exarchs of the Dalmatians, his friends, gained their sympathies through letters and gifts, opening many secret doors to him (this way)". Bodin was granted the Byzantine high title of protosebastos. In the final period of his rule, Mihailo achieved good relations with the Byzantine provinces in southern Italy. As a result, Bodin married Jaquinta of Bari, daughter of Bari's governor Argyritzos. As a Norman, Argyritzos supported Norman conquest of southern Italy. The Normans then made plans to attack Byzantine domain in the Balkans. Headed by Robert Guiscard, the Normans decided to capture Dyrrachium. Bodin initially engaged Normans in several skirmishes and sided with emperor Alexios in the upcoming Battle of Dyrrhachium. The battle occurred on 18 October 1081, however Bodin didn't engage in battle at all. He kept his army aside and when he saw than Normans are winning, he returned to Duklja. He used this Byzantine defeat to renounce any formal vassal relation which Byzantine Empire still considered to exist and to attack the hinterland of Duklja, taking from the Byzantines the lands of Serbia (old land of the Vlastimirović dynasty) and Bosnia, where he appointed his governors: his nephews Vukan and Marko in Serbia, and Stephen in Bosnia.

This irremediably spoiled the relations between Alexios and Bodin. The Byzantines regained Dyrrachium in 1085, after they pushed out the Normans, weakened after the death of Robert Guiscard. New governor of Dyrrachium, John Doukas, constantly battled with Bodin and Vukan, managing to capture Bodin in 1091 or 1092. Queen Jaquinta ruled in his absence but Bodin managed to escape again and to regain throne in 1093 or 1094, engaging the Byzantines yet again. But by this time, he already lost the power he had and Bosnia and Serbia quit vassal obligations and became separate states while Vukan of Serbia was described as a "man who held all the power in Dalmatia" (Dalmatia in the Roman sense, not as a modern region of Croatia). Bodin was mentioned for the last time in the winter of 1096/1097. He welcomed the first Crusaders, on their journey to Jerusalem, headed by Raymund of Toulouse and bishop Adhemar of Le Puy. On this occasion, Bodin and Raymund even became pobratimi, or blood brothers. Bodin died in 1101.

==== Decline ====
During the reigns of Mihailo and Bodin, Duklja saw its apogee. Having incorporated the Serbian hinterland and installed vassal rulers there, this maritime principality emerged as the most powerful Serb polity, seen in the titles used by its rulers ("Prince of Serbia", "of Serbs"). However, its rise was ultimately short-lived. Already at the time of Bodin's death, both Serbia and Bosnia were de facto independent from his state, while Duklja itself was struck by the civil war in the next decades, where the throne passed from Bodin's branch of the dynasty to the members from the line of Branislav, Bodin's paternal uncle. The dates are also approximate as there are no proper historical records from this period. Bodin's brother Dobroslav II inherited him directly (1101–1102), followed by Kočapar, brother of Branislav (1102–1103), before Vladimir, son of other Bodin's brother also named Vladimir, came to the throne (1103–1114). Bodin's son Đorđe ruled from 1114 to 1118 before being replaced with the Byzantine protégé Grubeša (1118–1125). Đorđe regained power in 1125 but the Byzantines again installed one of their favorites, Gradinja (1131–1146). Both Grubeša and Gradinja were also sons of Branislav. Gradinja was succeeded by his son Radoslav until 1162 when his lands were to be taken by the župan of Serbia, Desa.

However, Radoslav was succeeded by Mihailo, son of king Vladimir. In a letter from the Archbishop of Antivari Grgur, Stefan Nemanja, great župan of Serbia, and his brothers Stracimir Zavidović and Miroslav of Hum, were described as Mihailo's "maternal uncles who are pressuring him much". The entire 12th century was a period of total turmoil in Duklja, with numerous royal changes and Bodin's inheritors were overshadowed by the more and more powerful neighboring Serbia, starting from the rise under Vukan. Between 1113 and 1149 Duklja was the centre of Serbian–Byzantine conflict, with members of the Vojislavljević as protégés of either fighting each other for power. Some rulers of Duklja in this period were titled princes, while some retained the title of a king. Even Đorđe, son of king Bodin, had a seal which said "Đorđe, son of king Bodin", and not "King Đorđe". By January 1186, Stefan Nemanja finally conquered Duklja, annexing it to Serbia. The faith of the final ruler of Duklja, Mihailo, is unknown, but in 1189 his wife Desislava is mentioned as being a widow. Duklja then became a crown land of Serbia, subsequently becoming known as Zeta, remaining so until the fall of the Serbian Empire in the 14th century. Members of the Nemanjić dynasty who governed Duklja-Zeta in this period, were given a titular title of king. The very first one, Vukan Nemanjić, appointed by his father Stefan Nemanja, was titled king (rex) of "Duklja, Dalmatia, Travunija, Toplica and Hvosno" (Latin: Dioclie, Dalmatie, Tribunie, Toplize et Cosne).

=== Vukanović dynasty in Serbia ===
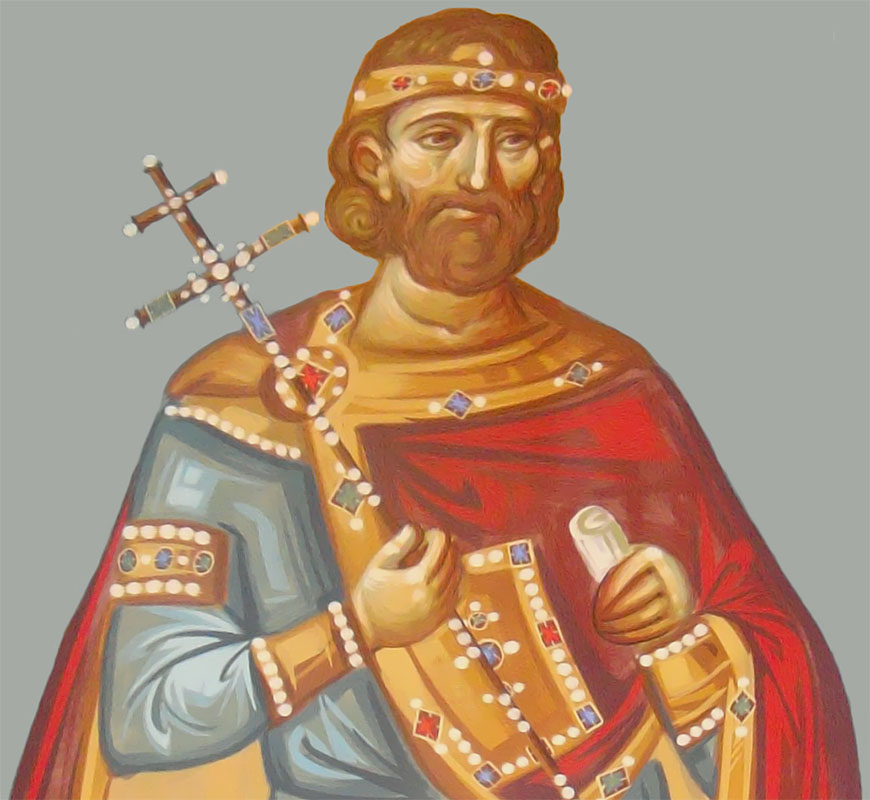
Fresco of the grand prince Vukan, founder of the Vukanović dynasty

The Grand Principality of Serbia was founded c. 1090 by Vukan, Grand Prince of Serbia. His expansion over the Serbian-Byzantine frontier resulted in the Byzantine–Serbian War (1090–1095) (and Battle of Zvečan in 1094). Although some historians consider that Stari Ras and its region of Raška (Latin: Rascia) at this time became Serbian possessions, it was constantly re-captured by the Byzantines until the 1140s, and only during the time of Stefan Nemanja (cca. 1160s) "the Serbs finally conquered the Rascian region".

The Grand Principality lasted until its elevation to a kingdom in 1217. For the first half of this period, Serbia was ruled by the Vukanović dynasty, a cadet branch of the Vojislavljević dynasty of Duklja, while in the second half it was ruled by the Nemanjić dynasty, itself a cadet line of the Vukanović.

==== Origin and expansion ====
Following the defeat of Byzantine by the Normans in 1081 at Dyrrachium, Bodin of Duklja attacked Byzantine territories deeper in the Balkans, conquering Serbia and the old Vlastimirović country. Bodin installed his courtiers and nephews, Vukan and Marko, as the local governors, župans, in c. 1082. Marko was never mentioned again in the records, and historians later named this dynasty after Vukan, though technically it was Marko who was a progenitor of the new dynasty, as his son succeeded Vukan. During the wars with John Doukas, after Byzantine's recapture of Dyrrachium in 1085, Vukan initially lost several fortified cities fighting on the side of his paramount ruler, Bodin. However, he later severed vassal connections to Duklja by 1090 during Bodin's captivity by the Byzantines and took the title of grand župan, thereby emerging as the most powerful ruler in ancient Dalmatia (central-west Balkans).

Vukan broke into the Byzantine-held Kosovo Field in 1093, conquering and burning the town of Lipljan. Emperor Alexios I Komnenos personally headed the army to engage Vukan. However, Vukan withdrew to the fortified town of Zvečan and offered a negotiation. The emperor's acceptance points to the importance Vukan apparently had. Vukan seems to be aware of the power he had as he soon broke the truce again, attacking Kosovo again in 1093–1094. He defeated a Byzantine army led by the emperor's nephew John Komnenos and continued his advance, conquering initially the Kosovo Field area between Zvečan and Lipljan, but also advancing deeper into the Byzantine territory, plundering the surroundings of Skopje and acquiring Vranje and Polog Valley. Emperor Alexios I Komnenos again came to Lipljan in the summer of 1094, and Vukan again negotiated. He accepted not to attack Byzantine lands in the future, sending to the Byzantine Empire his fraternal nephews Uroš and Stefan Vukan and some 20 other cousins and župans, as collateral. Before his death in c. 1112–1115, Vukan attacked the Byzantines once again in the spring of 1106. Before the fighting ended in November of the same year, Vukan once again defeated John Komnenos. Vukan also intervened in the neighboring Duklja. After the death of King Bodin, Vukan participated in the succession wars. He supported Kočapar in his opposition to Dobroslav II. In the Battle at Morača, Dobroslav II was defeated, captured and sent to Serbia in chains. Kočapar and Vukan then took over Duklja, plundering a "very big part of Dalmatia". Vukan later married his historically unnamed daughter to Vladimir, Kočapar's successor to the throne of Duklja. He then liberated Dobroslav, as he was a paternal uncle of king Vladimir.

==== Byzantine suzerainty ====
Vukan was succeeded by his nephew Uroš I, son of his brother Marko, who was handed over to the Byzantines in 1094. During the period of a new Byzantine expansion and growth, known as the century-long Komnenos Renaissance, under the historically unknown circumstances the Byzantines took Ras and stationed a military crew there. They restored a vassal rule over Serbia, establishing a tough grip over the Serbs. A large amount of population was resettled by the Byzantine emperor John II Komnenos to Nicomedia, in Asia Minor. After the Byzantine–Hungarian War of 1127–1129 broke out, the Serbs rebelled against the Byzantines. Though ultimately defeated, the Serbs managed to retake and raze the town of Ras. John II Komnenos punished the Ras commander who lost the city to the Serbs by forcing him to wear female dress and ride through the streets of Constantinople on a donkey. In the next period, whenever Hungarian army would appear on the Danube to engage the Byzantines in various skirmishes, the Serbs would rebel.

This situation prompted Uroš I to search for support among the Hungarians which resulted in the first marital connections of Serbian dynasties with the ruling dynasties of Europe. Helena, daughter of Uroš I, married Hungarian king Béla II. She was proposed for Béla, then an heir apparent, by his uncle and predecessor Stephen II in 1129. After Béla II succeeded to the throne in 1131, Helena became de facto ruler, as he was blinded as a child. She organized reprisals and mass executions of the magnates who participated in Béla's blinding. She also extended her rule during the regency and initial ruling years of her son Géza II. Her two other sons also later became kings of Hungary: Ladislaus II and Stephen IV. Helena's brother, Beloš, also established himself in Hungary, becoming a palatine, co-regent of Hungary (1141–1146) and ban of Croatia (1142–1158 and 1163). Beloš married his daughter to Vladimir III Mstislavich, later a Grand Prince of Kiev. Uroš I married his second daughter, Marija, to Conrad II of Znojmo, a Bohemian prince, where she became known as Mary of Serbia. Two remaining children of Uroš I, sons Uroš II and Desa remained in Serbia and participated in the political life. Hungarian-backed politics of Uroš I prevented Byzantines to fully occupy and dismantle Serbia as they did in Duklja for a while. During the rule of Uroš I, a meddling of the ruling dynasties of Serbia and Duklja into each other affairs continued, though they descended from the same lineage.

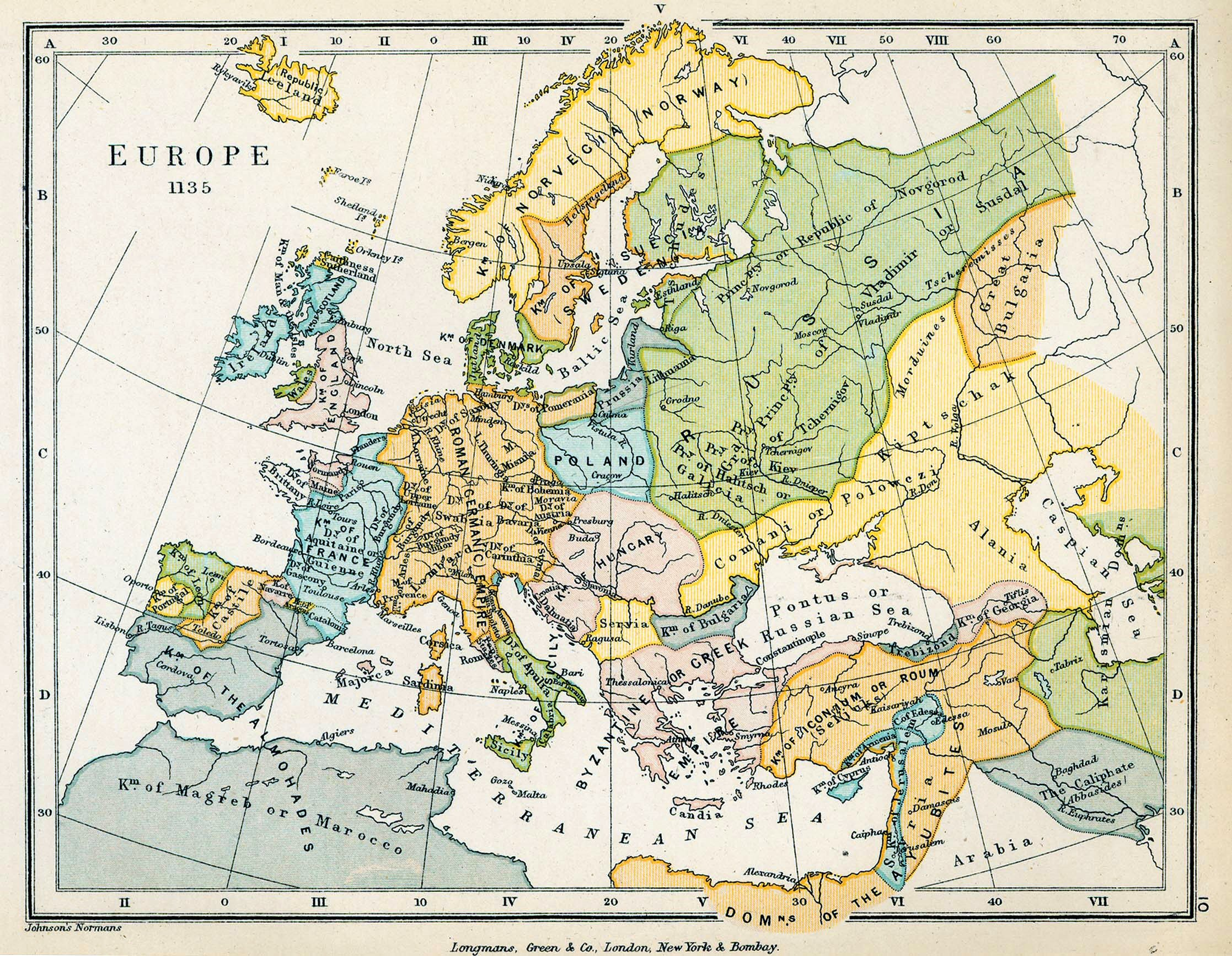
Grand Principality of Serbia during the reign of grand prince Uroš I, c. 1135

Uroš II succeeded his father in 1146. As a vassal, he was obliged to send troops to the Byzantines during their wars in Europe or against the Turks in Asia. Political situation in Europe changed drastically during and after the Second Crusade (1147–1149). Conrad III of Germany and Byzantine emperor Manuel I Komnenos forged an alliance. Feeling threatened, Louis VII of France made his own alliance which included the Normans from the southern Italy, Conrad's enemies in Germany and Hungarian king. Uroš joined this group in an effort to shake off Byzantine tutelage. Within the scopes of the wider Byzantine-Hungarian fightings, a war between the Serbs and the Byzantines lasted on-and-off from 1149 to 1153. Emperor Manuel personally headed the army twice as the fierce fighting occurred in 1149 and 1150. In 1149 the Byzantines took over Ras for a short while, razing the town and burning Uroš's court. They also occupied the towns of Galič and Nikava. In the late summer of 1150 a decisive battle happened, with Serbs being supported by the massive Hungarian detachments. In the Battle of Tara, small river near modern Valjevo, emperor Manuel I in his second command over the army "fought heroically, leading his army to the great victory". According to the historian John Kinnamos, after the defeat and without knowledge of the emperor, Uroš II was removed and his brother Desa was appointed as the new grand župan in November 1150. However, Manuel I restored Uroš II by 1151, who acknowledged vassalage again, accepting even more obligations.

Uroš attempted to restore Serbian full independence again in 1153, but even before it escalated into the fully fledged war, he again recognized the supreme Byzantine power. As the Hungarian-Byzantine clashes ended in 1155, so were Uroš's attempts to regain independence. His brother Desa dethroned him again in 1155, but being vassal of the emperor, Uroš enjoyed a certain support from Manuel. Two brothers stood in front of Manuel who again chose Uroš. Uroš remained loyal to Manuel until 1162 when he rebelled again. Manuel then finally dethroned Uroš, appointing his brother Beloš, who just returned to Serbia from Hungary. After only several months, Beloš went back to Hungary and Manuel appointed Desa as the new grand župan.

Before finally occupying the throne, Desa, the youngest son of Uroš I, administered the old lands of Duklja, Zachlumia and Travunija since the mid-12th century. After second unsuccessful attempt to overthrow his brother Uroš II in 1155, he was given the region of Dendra, near Niš. When Manuel appointed him to the Serbian throne in 1162, Desa promised to be loyal as long as he lives and that he would completely withdraw from Dendra, leaving it to the Byzantines. However, he refused to leave Dendra, so he had to justify himself to Manuel, when the emperor came to Niš in 1163. That same year a 5 years long war between Hungary and the Byzantine Empire broke out. Though he appeared as if trying to keep the balance between the two, Desa was more inclined to the Hungarian side, in the lasting effort to secure independence for Serbia from the Byzantines. He even tried to make contacts with the Germans and to marry some of the German princesses. Manuel wasn't satisfied with Desa's attitude during the war. After several warnings, the emperor had him seized and exiled to Constantinople, but Desa apparently managed to escape. In the end, Manuel expelled Desa in 1165, who fled to Hungary. As the new grand župan, the emperor appointed Tihomir, member of the cadet branch of the Vojislavljević and the Vukanović dynasties, which would develop into the Nemanjić dynasty.

Tihomir was one of four brothers who were all local lords, but emperor Manuel appointed him as the main ruler. The other three brothers were Stracimir, Miroslav and Stefan Nemanja. They were sons of Zavida, also a local lord who was member of the ruling family, but the exact connection to the Vukanović dynasty is not known. Despite turbulent times of the last period of the Vukanović dynasty, none of the brothers had a prominent role on the state level. Tensions grew between the brothers and in 1166, a year after he was appointed, Tihomir was overthrown by Stefan Nemanja who became the sole ruler.

== Late Middle Ages ==
=== Kingdom of Serbia ===
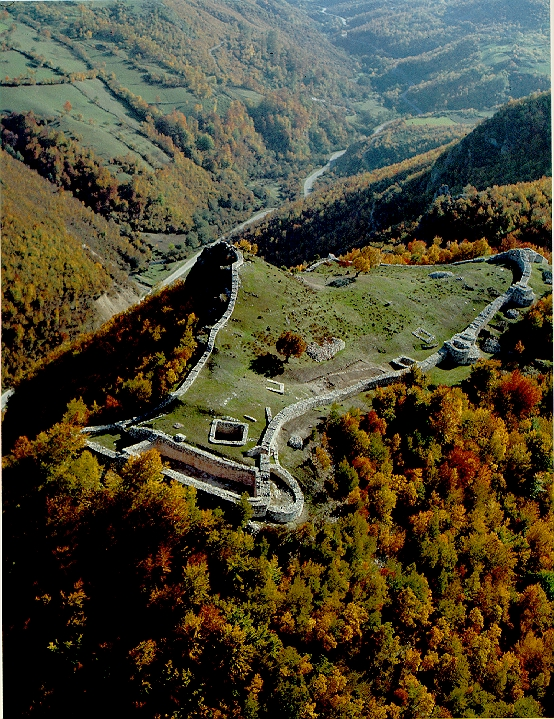
Ruins of Ras, medieval capital of Serbia in 12th and 13th centuries

Grand Prince Stefan Nemanja (1166–1196) succeeded in uniting Serbian lands, gaining independence from the declining Byzantine Empire. He was succeeded by his middle son Stefan, while his first-born son Vukan was given the rule of the Zeta region (present-day Montenegro). Stefan Nemanja's youngest son Rastko became a monk (as Sava), turning all his efforts to spread religion among his people. Since the Catholic Church already had ambitions to spread its influence to the Balkans as well, Stefan took advantage and obtained the royal crown from the Pope in 1217. In Byzantium, Sava managed to secure autocephaly (independence) for the Serbian Church and became the first Serbian archbishop in 1219. In the same year Sava issued the first constitution in Serbia, the Zakonopravilo. Thus the medieval Serbian state acquired both forms of independence: political and religious.

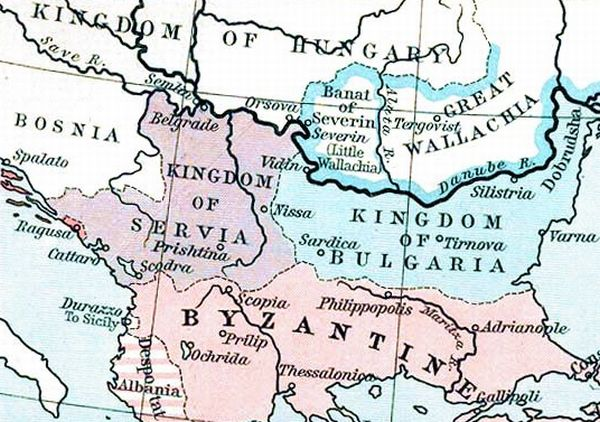
Serbia in 1265

The next generation of Serbian rulers, the sons of King Stefan, Stefan Radoslav, Stefan Vladislav and Stefan Uroš I, marked a period of stagnation of the state structure. All three kings were more or less dependent on some of the neighboring states—Byzantium, Bulgaria or Hungary. The ties with the Hungarians played a decisive role in the fact that Uroš I was succeeded by his son Stefan Dragutin, whose wife was a Hungarian princess. Later on, when Dragutin abdicated in favor of his younger brother Milutin (in 1282), the Hungarian king Ladislaus IV gave him lands in northeastern Bosnia, the region of Mačva, and the city of Belgrade, while he managed to conquer and annex lands in northeastern Serbia. Thus, some of these territories became part of the Serbian state for the first time. In alliance with his brother, he also acquired the regions of Kučevo and Braničevo. His new state was named Kingdom of Srem. In that time the name Srem was a designation for two territories: Upper Srem (present day Srem) and Lower Srem (present day Mačva). Kingdom of Srem under the rule of Stefan Dragutin was actually Lower Srem, but some historical sources mention that Stefan Dragutin also ruled over Upper Srem and Slavonia. After Dragutin died (in 1316), the new ruler of the Kingdom of Srem became his son, king Vladislav II, who ruled this state until 1325.

Under the rule of Dragutin's younger brother—King Stefan Milutin, Serbia grew stronger despite having to occasionally fight wars on three different fronts. King Milutin was an apt diplomat much inclined to the use of a customary medieval diplomatic and dynastic marriages. He was married five times, with Hungarian, Bulgarian and Byzantine princesses. He is also famous for building churches, some of which are the finest examples of medieval Serbian architecture: the Gračanica monastery in Kosovo, the Cathedral in Hilandar monastery on Mount Athos, the St. Archangel Church in Jerusalem etc. Because of his endowments, King Milutin has been proclaimed a saint, in spite of his tumultuous life.

Milutin was succeeded by his son Stefan Dečanski, who maintained his father's kingdom and had monasteries built, the most notable being Visoki Dečani in Metohija (Kosovo), after which he is known in historiography. Visoki Dečani, Our Lady of Ljeviš and the Gračanica monastery, all founded by Dečanski, are part of the Medieval Monuments in Kosovo, a combined World Heritage Site. After decisively defeated the Bulgarians, Serbia was caught up in an internal war between two groups of the Serbian nobility, one supporting Dečanski, the other supporting his son Stefan Dušan which sought to expand to the south. The struggle ended in 1331, when the old King was forced to abdicate.

=== Serbian Empire ===
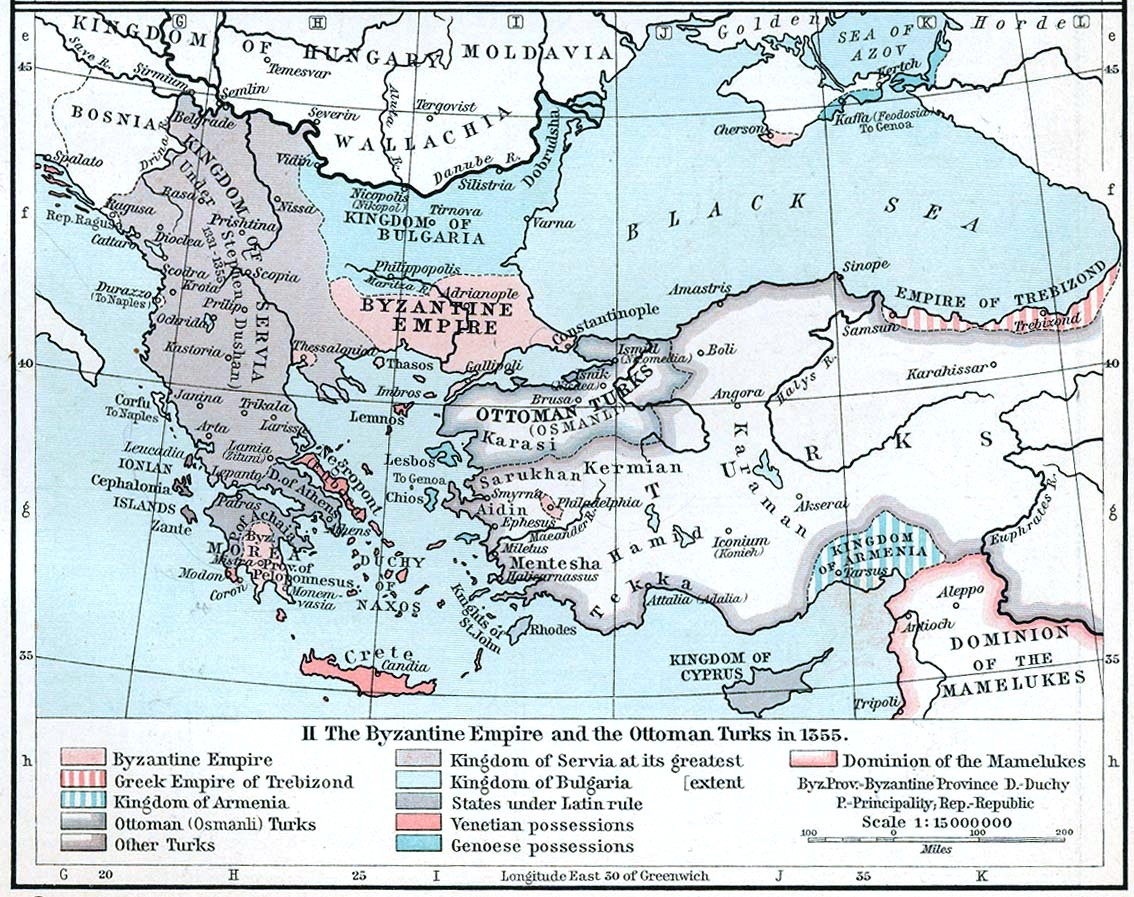
Serbian Empire in 1355

In the first half of the 14th century Serbia flourished, becoming one of the most powerful countries in Southeastern Europe. It had a substantial political, economic, and cultural achievements, followed by high ambitions of its new ruler. Stefan Dušan became King of Serbia in 1331 and in the following decades fought the Byzantine Empire, taking advantage of the Byzantine civil wars. After conquering Albania, Macedonia and much of Greece, he was crowned Emperor in 1346, after having elevated the Serbian archbishopric into a patriarchate. He had his son crowned King, giving him nominal rule over the "Serbian lands", and although Dušan was governing the whole state, he had special responsibility for the "Roman" (Byzantine) lands. "Dušan's Code" was enacted in 1349 and amended in 1353–1354. Dušan sought to conquer Constantinople and become the new Byzantine emperor, however, he suddenly died in 1355 at the age of 47. His son and successor, Serbian Emperor Stefan Uroš V (1355–1371) did not inherit his father's ruling abilities, and by 1365 magnates appointed him a co-ruler, King Vukašin of Serbia, who fell in Battle of Maritsa, fighting against Ottoman Turks.

During the period of the Serbian Empire, there were instances where Albanians persecuted Serbs. These actions included attacks on Serbian communities, leading to violence, displacement, and the destruction of property. Such conflicts were part of the broader regional struggles during the empire's existence.

=== Decline ===
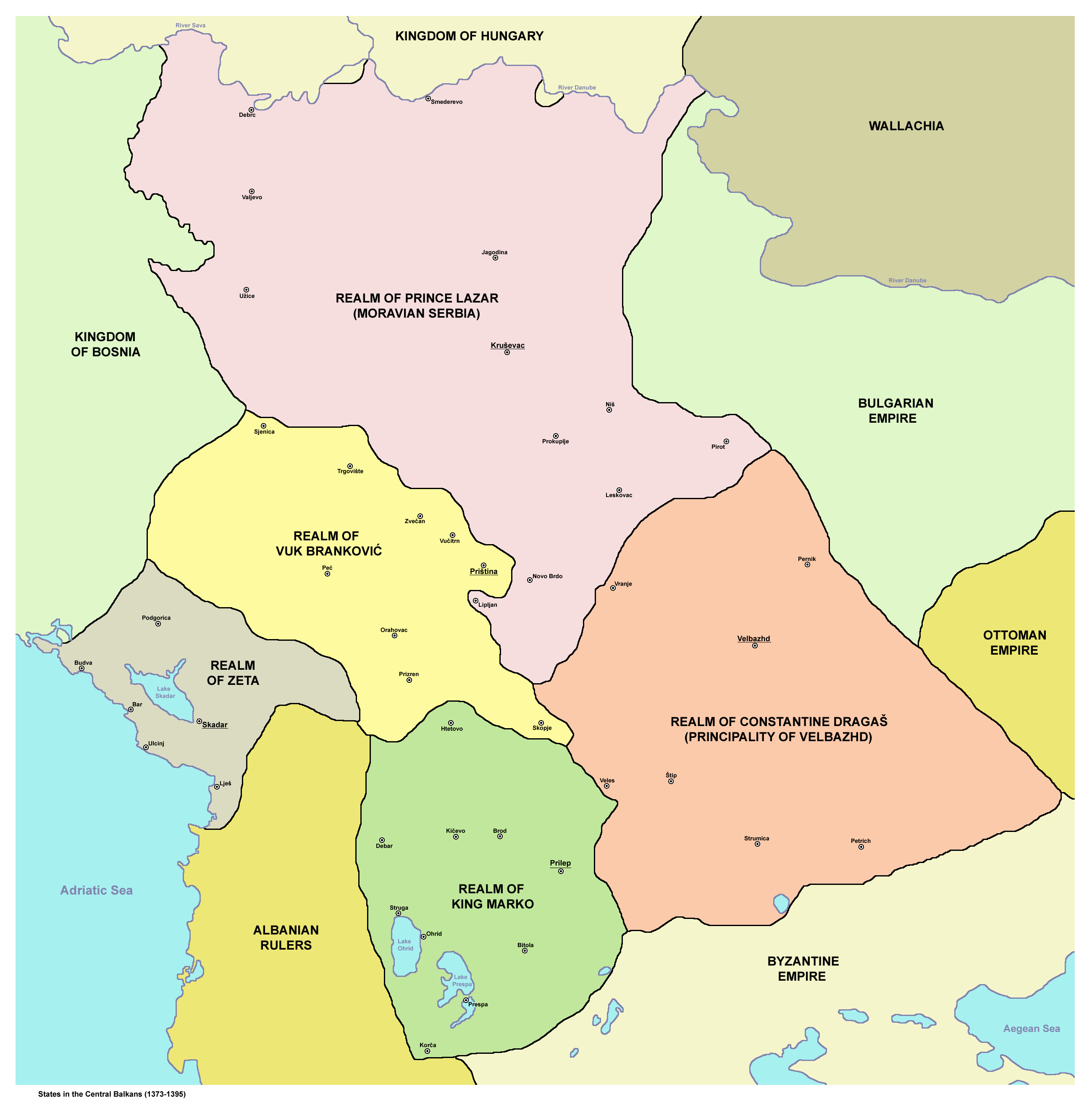
Realms that emerged after the fall of Serbian Empire

The death of Emperor Stefan Uroš V in 1371 marked the end of the Nemanjić dynasty in Serbia. The empire in disintegration was left without an heir and regional magnates (velikaši) finally obtained the absolute rule over their provinces, completing the process of feudal fragmentation. They continued to govern as independent rulers, with titles such as gospodin, and despot, given to them during the Empire.

Serbian lands were thus divided between the regional lords: King Marko, son of King Vukašin of Serbia, claimed the royal title and seized southwestern regions, while the Dejanović brothers, nephews of the late Emperor Stefan Dušan, ruled the southeastern provinces. Other lords were: Đurađ I Balšić, Vuk Branković, Nikola Altomanović, and Lazar Hrebeljanović. Lazar managed to rule most of what is today Central Serbia (known as Moravian Serbia). He was unable to unite the Serbian magnates, as they were too powerful and pursued their own interests, fighting each other. On the other side, Tvrtko I of Bosnia annexed several western regions, and claimed, since he was descended through his paternal grandmother from the Nemanjić dynasty, that he was the rightful hair to Serbian throne. In 1377, he came to his newly acquired provinces in western Serbia and was crowned in Mileševa Monastery as King of the Serbs and Bosnia.

The period after the Battle of Maritsa (1371) saw the rise of a new threat, the Ottoman Turks. They began raiding Moravian Serbia in 1381, though the actual invasion came later. In 1386, Lazar's knights beat the Ottoman army near Pločnik, in what is today southern Serbia. Another invasion by Ottomans came in the summer of 1389, this time aiming towards Kosovo.

On 28 June 1389 the two armies met at Kosovo, in a battle that ended in a draw, decimating both armies (both Lazar and Murad I fell). The battle is particularly important to Serbian history, tradition, and national identity, as symbolized in the Kosovo Myth. By now, the Balkans were unable to halt the advancing Ottomans. Eventually, Serbian nobility became Ottoman vassals.

Serbia managed to recuperate under Despot Stefan Lazarević, surviving for 70 more years, experiencing a cultural and political renaissance, but after Stefan Lazarević's death, his successors from the Branković dynasty did not manage to stop the Ottoman advance. Serbia finally fell under the Ottomans in 1459, and remained under their occupation until 1804, when Serbia finally managed to regain its sovereignty.

=== Serbian Despotate ===
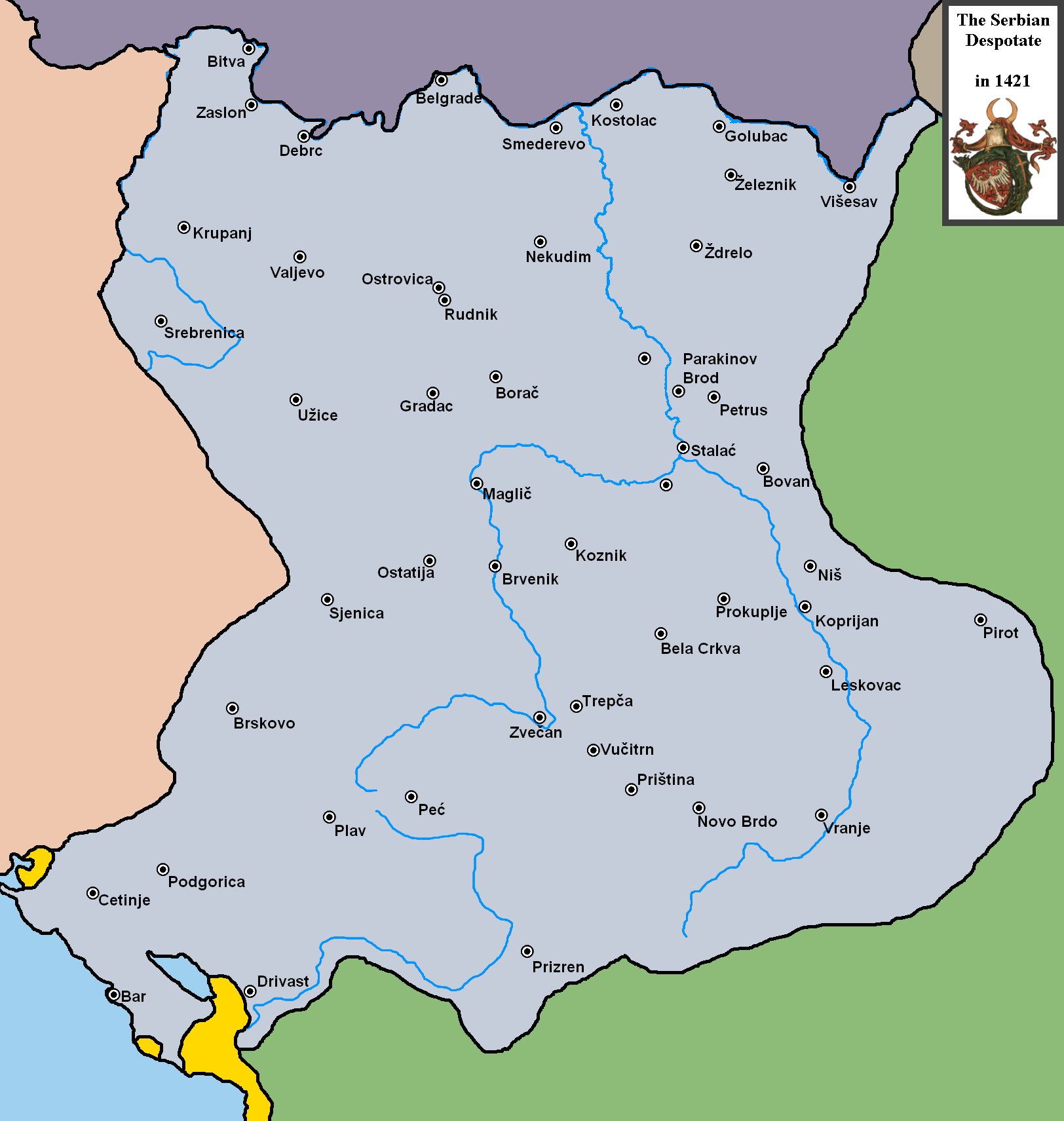
Serbian Despotate from 1421 to 1427

Despite the deep-seated impression that the mighty medieval Serbian state perished in one single magnificent battle, as derived from the Kosovo Myth, Serbia survived exactly 70 years after the 1389 Battle of Kosovo and perished under the Ottomans gradually languishing and shrinking. The danger was hinted already during its higher position of power, under the rule of emperor Dušan, when the Ottomans made the first permanent foothold on the European continent. Critical position was enhanced after the crumbling of the unified empire into the separate feudal states and the Battle of Maritsa (1371) and Kosovo. The battles reduced the state's territory and diminished its "living force". The Ottoman defeat by the Timurid Empire at the Battle of Angora in 1402 and the ensuing turmoil in the empire, allowed for several decades of revival in Serbia (Lazarević renaissance).

In this period, during the reigns of despots Stefan Lazarević (1389–1427) and Đurađ Branković (1427–1456), Serbia cooperated with Hungary. In the second half of the 15th century, the Ottoman conquest became a major issue in the European politics. Taking Crusades as a mold, both the rulers of the European states and the church leaders forged a myriad of plans for researching and repelling the Turks. However, when the time for the serious preparations would come, the funding would turn out to be a major problem. As the feudal states engaged more and more in the mutual wars, there was no money for the operations on the east of the continent. Being on the frontline of the Ottoman expansion, Serbia and Hungary formed an alliance. The greatest fruit of this collaboration was the joint 1443 campaign which resulted in the liberation of Serbia and its reestablishment as a state after it was conquered by the Ottomans in 1439.

However, in the times to come, Serbia couldn't rely much on its western allies. Hungary was in the internal crisis of its own, while European courts and church provided no help, organizing instead a series of fruitless councils in Wiener Neustadt, Frankfurt and Mantua. The downfall of Serbia was accelerated after the Fall of Constantinople in 1453 which allowed for the Ottoman sultan Mehmed the Conqueror to turn his efforts to capture the remaining parts of the Balkans and Hungary. The Turks conquered the southern parts of Serbia in 1455, rich in both ores and arable land, including the large cities and mines of Trepča end, especially important and wealthy Novo Brdo, "the mother of all cities". Mehmed tried to capture Belgrade in 1456, which was part of Hungary at time, but was defeated. The Ottomans withdrew and halted the campaigns for a while.

=== Ottoman conquest ===
The attacks were renewed and by 1458 the Ottomans controlled the northern and central Serbia, reducing Serbia only to the strip of land with the capital Smederevo and its surroundings. Additionally, in such a diminished territory, internal strife broke out after the death of despot Lazar Branković in February 1458. Ruling class divided in two groups, one of which was for inauguration of a pro-Turkish man to appease the Ottomans while the other group was against it. Pro-Turkish Michael Angelović opened the gate to the company of Turks, but he was removed and captured while the Turks were killed. In an attempt to prolong the fall of the state, despot Lazar's daughter Maria Branković was married to the Bosnian heir apparent Stephen Tomašević, uniting the two lands as in the time of the migration to the Balkans. This has been done in an agreement and with cooperation from Hungary, but the Ottomans were against it, and even tried to capture young prince before he reached Smederevo in 1459. However, there was no practical gain from enthroning Stephen as Serbian despot in March 1459, as Bosnian kingdom was in only marginally better position than Serbia at the time. Instead of resurrecting the state, despot Stephen was the one who negotiated the surrender of Smederevo to the Ottomans, who in turn allowed the Bosnian entourage to leave the fortified city and entered the vacant Smederevo on 20 June 1459, which marks the end the medieval Serbian state. At the time, prince "drew on his shoulders the wrath and contempt of the entire Europe because of the Smederevo surrender, but he atoned himself four years later, when as the Bosnian king was killed during the Turkish conquest of Bosnia".

=== The aftermath ===
The fall of the medieval Serbian despotate marked the discontinuation of the free development of society and economy based on the foundations built by the Serbian people since the period of the migration. Those foundations were, like in the rest of the Europe, feudal. Population was diversified according to the usual divisions of the societies in the period, producing numerous goods and creating huge wealth for the ruling, noble and upper classes. Wealth produced in Serbia was at the time subject of numerous stories which spread both to the east and the west of Europe, though many of them were obviously exaggerated.

With the conquest, Serbia was cut off from the European cultural and political community in which she carved its own place. Being in a region under both Byzantine and Italian cultural influence, medieval Serbia developed a significant culture of its own. Comparison of the cultural development of Serbia and the rest of Europe in the 15th and the 19th century, when Serbia regained independence from the Turks, shows the massive loss and lagging behind as a result of the 1459 events.

== Society ==
=== Settlements ===
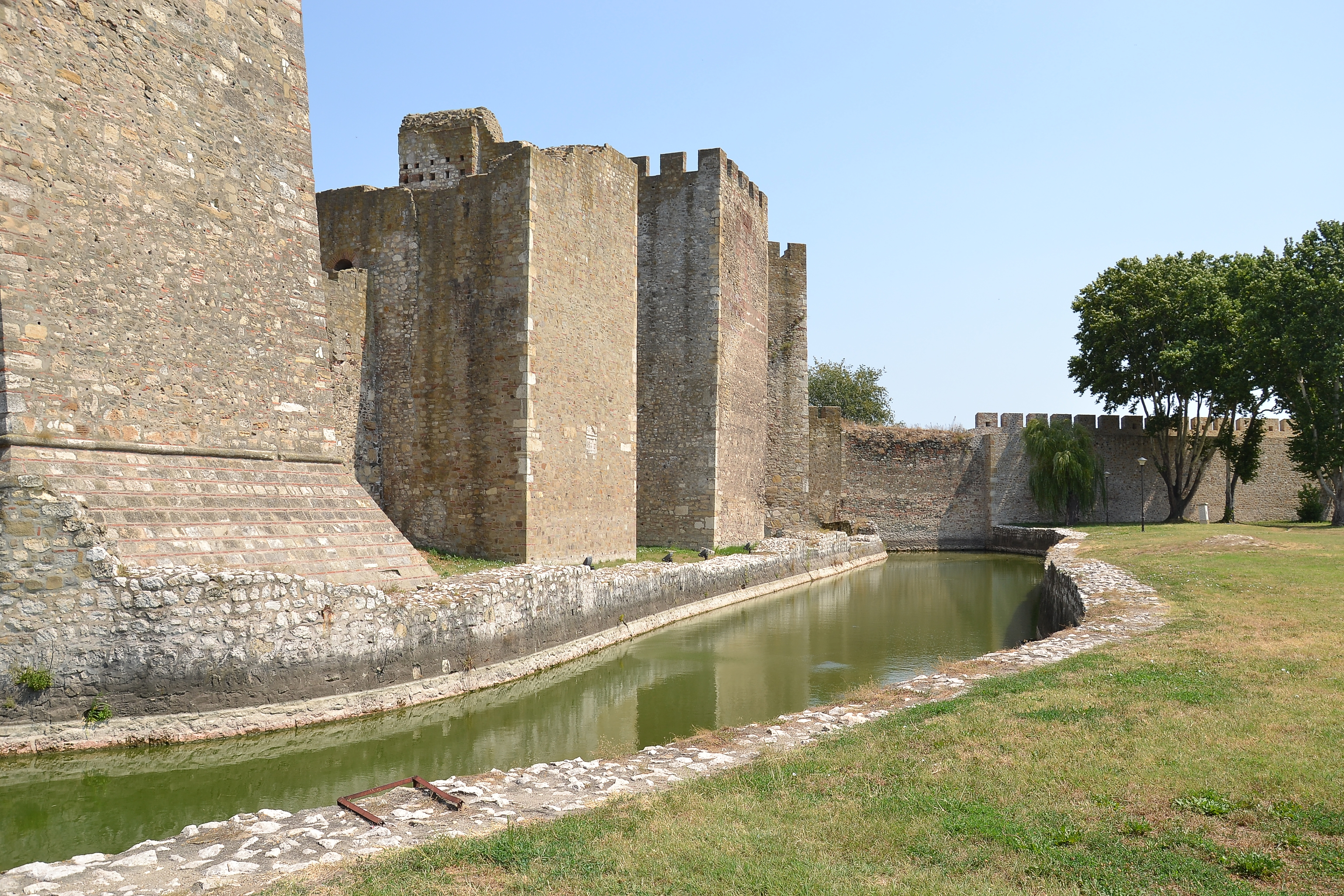
Smederevo Fortress, one of the largest medieval fortifications in Europe

First settlements were the typical half-dug houses, present throughout all Slavic areas. They were located in the valleys of the major rivers, close to the water itself. By the 8th and the 9th century, population began to settle close to, and within the abandoned Roman cities and fortresses. Though the ramparts offered protection, majority of population remained in the traditional, scattered open settlements. All important centers within the walls had some administrative buildings and churches, either within the ramparts (Dabravine, Martinići) or outside of the walls (Ston, Ras, settlements in the Sarajevo Field).

=== Burials ===
One of the first changes among Slavs, which spanned jointly with the acceptance of Christianity during these centuries, were burial customs. In the 9th and 10th century, the predominant type of burial sites became the "cemeteries with burial in row" (groblje na redove). Christian influences included burying of the bodies in the stretched position, with or without a casket, with the head in the west direction, but the graves contained pottery vessels and other burial objects, remnants of the pre-Christian customs. In time, the latter became less and less present. In the mountainous and hilly areas, the cemeteries were usually located on hillocks or elevations (Mihaljevići, near Sarajevo), in lowlands they were built in the valley bottoms (Mahovljani, near Banja Luka; Petoševci, near Laktaši), while some were located in the ruins from the late antiquity (Cim, near Mostar; Višići).

In many cemeteries, evidence of cremation were discovered, but they make only a few percent of the graves (Gomjenica near Prijedor, Petoševci, Dvorovi, Batković, Čelarevo, Novi Slankamen). Various objects, like iron knives, were buried next to some of the urns. At the Trnovica locality, near Zvornik, the urn was buried inside the much older, prehistoric mound. Unique way of burials appeared in time, consisting of stone mounds. With the diameter of 4 m (13 ft) or more, and grouped into the collections of several dozens, they are believed to contain cremated remains. Dated from the 8th to the 11th century, only few were examined. Sparse pieces of pottery, jewelry and personal items were discovered but the origin of the practice, and if they indeed were burial sites, remains unanswered.

There is almost complete absence of expensive jewelry and personal items from this period. Those items and artifacts that were discovered, show that economic inequality among the inhabitants of one locality was quite low. Some personal items distinguished the difference, at least when it comes to the ruling family, like in the case of the Seal of Strojimir. Still, though a quality work, it is an unpretentious and typical artwork of the day. The jewelry was not distinguished from the other Byzantine-influenced Slavs. It was made in the Byzantine artisan shops and in the Byzantine manner, which in turn was Roman in origin. Main surviving artifacts include female jewelry: earrings, rings, necklaces, pendants, etc. Older pieces were simple and cast from bronze, but in time more sophisticated techniques, like filigree, granulation and gold plating, were used, while the main material switched to silver.

=== Social classes ===
As the basic social unit in Serbia was family, the dominant type of ownership was collective, or familiar, in all the classes. Furthermore, the house, or the family, was a legal entity, when it dealt with the state. It was represented by one of the family elders.

Some of the offices and social classes included:

- Nobility

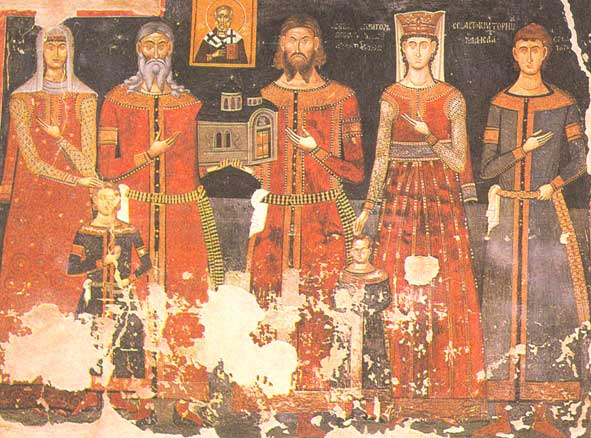
Representation of Serbian nobleman Paskač and his family, mid-14th century

  - Logotet ("logothete") was the royal chancellor, the most senior court clerk and keeper of the royal seal. His duty was drafting of the public documents and he administered the scribes (dijak). Prince Lazar Hrebeljanović was previously logotet of Emperor Dušan. His son, Despot Stefan Lazarević had two chancellors, logotet and the Latin chancellor. Logotets were also sent on various diplomatic missions.
  - Čelnik or čeonik was a type of elder, a chief or head of some state institute or local administration. The title was recorded for the first time in the 11th century, during Peter Delyan's rebellion of 1040–41. Emperor Dušan appointed čelniks to head cities within the empire. There was a special category of čelniks, which were employed at the royal court. Their duties included the protection of the ruler and implementation of his commands and orders. In time, they became integrated into the central state administration and began to take over other duties, outside of their usual function: protectors of the church land, judges, dvorodržica, kaznac (treasurer), tepčija (majordomo of the royal lands and household), etc.
  - Dvorodržica ("court handler") was taking care of the royal court's management. The tenure became a norm during the rule of the Lazarević dynasty in the 14th and 15th century. He had a major position among the central management. The appointment was copied from previous similar positions which existed on the courts of despot Jovan Uglješa, Alexander Komnenos Asen, ruler of the Principality of Valona or the Bosnian kings. The permanent court was situated in Kruševac but the royal family often traversed through the country. Among the duties of dvorodržica was to set those temporary courts and organize their normal functioning. He was authorized to issue orders to the citizens all over the state to construct and structure the courts and providing and sustaining them. He was always present at the court and, due to its high social status, he could serve as a witness for the various documents issued by the ruler.
- Sebri – Commoner
  - Meroph (also meropah or parik, plural merops(i)) was a serf. Apart from the laboring duties to the upper feudal class, he had other tributes he had to pay. One was soća, a type of tax, which had to be paid by every house. The amount of soća was 1 perper per year and it could be paid either in money or grains. The other tribute was priselica. It consisted of meroph's duty to accommodate, feed and escort his master and the official guests and travelers: rulers, their courtiers, clerks, envoys, etc. Meroph was also obliged to sow, plow, harvest and thresh 7.5 mats of the church land. Mat was a measure for cereal grains, but also was a measure of area: it was a patch of land which could be seeded by a mat of cereals. Approximately, one mat was either 40 lb (18 kg) (weight) or 200 square motikas (or 1.44 ha (3.6 acres); surface).
  - Ćelator was a member of the poor class, who were employed by the monasteries. They worked on the monastery farms, mostly handling the smaller livestock (sheep, goats) and wool processing. They had different duties from other herders, the nomadic vlah or merops (singular meropah or meroph), the serfs. It was not allowed for a meroph to wed a vlah girl and to become vlah himself. If he would do that after all, the couple would be pushed back down the social ladder and would become ćelators or to the position in the society occupied by their parents. Even then, they were not allowed to be vlah soldiers. Though they shared part of the social duties with ćelators, the latter were more numerous and more poor. One joint duty they both fulfilled was bringing cheese down the mountain, to the monasteries. As ćelators couldn't pay their duties in products, they were shearing the sheep and used wool to make blankets and thick vests (klašnja).

=== Law ===
In medieval Serbia, laws were promulgated by the ruler and the state assembly, known as "Sabor", that consisted both of secular nobles and ecclesiastical dignitaries.

Law-enforcing powers were delegated by the state to regional and village chieftains, but only as long as it was in accordance with the royal codes. The locals were strongly discouraged from enforcing justice of their own, as taking legal matters in your own hands was also against the law. Though officially judged by the magistrates, the village councils, which were to be elected to start and conduct the criminal proceedings, were the root of the inquisitor-type examinations in Serbia, which were cut with the fall of the state, and failed to develop into the similar Western Europe counterpart. The proceedings were called "general investigations". Stealing was one of the major concern of the code. The council would first have to establish if the person is indeed guilty of stealing and then whether this person is a "well known thief", meaning that he has, in modern terms, "criminal history". If a village would harbor such a thief, the entire village would be resettled, and the villagers were obliged to pay the damage to the victim. The punishment for professional thieves was blinding. Thieves who were on the "lower level" were punished with some sort of body mutilation: cutting of pieces of ears, or entire noses and hands in some harsher or repeated crimes. Modern crime scholars consider this rudimentary criminal records: by seeing what was cut on some criminal, you could see how far he progressed in his crimes.

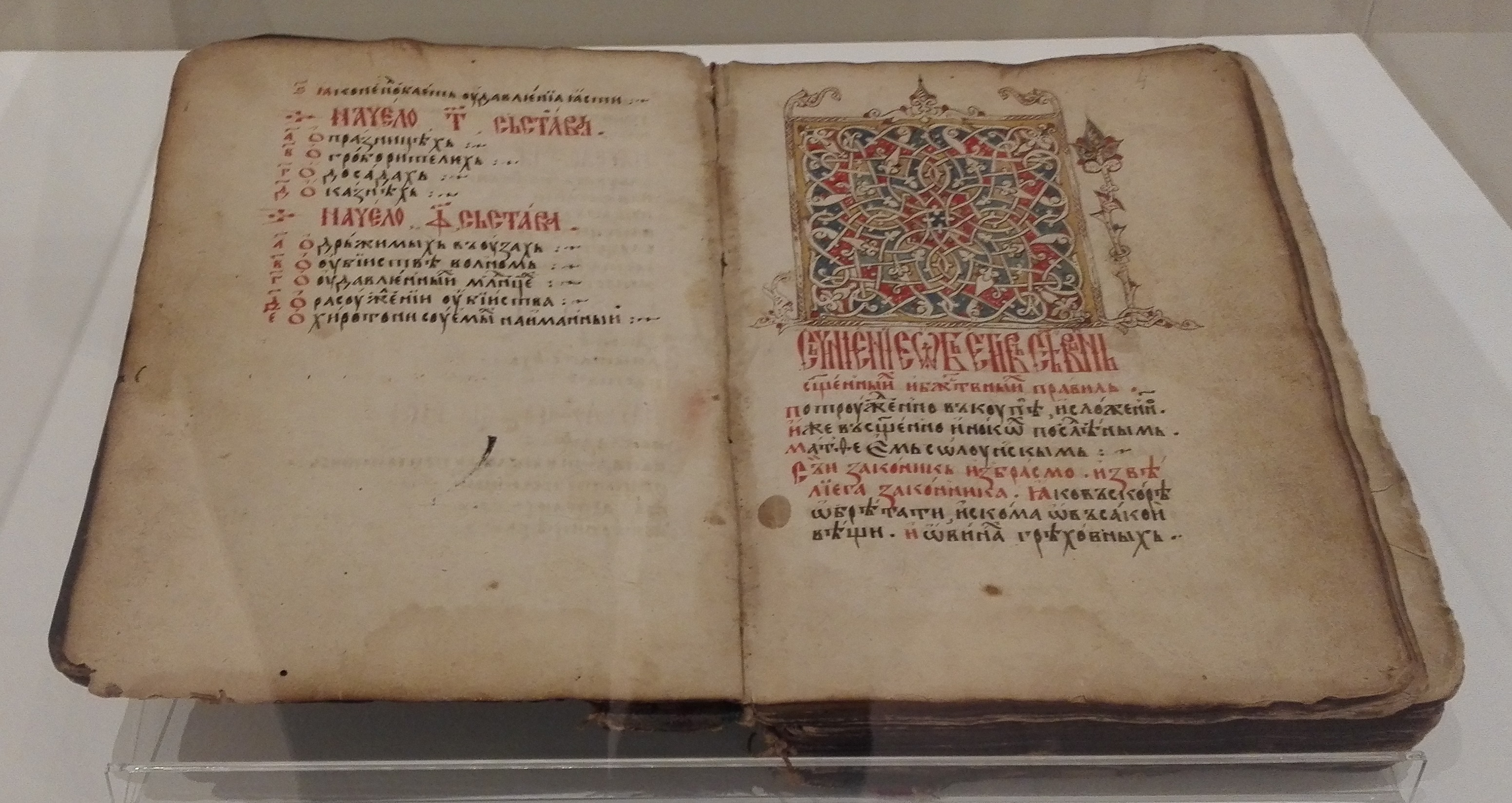
15th-century manuscript of Dušan's Code, 14th-century law codex

As mirrored by modern laws, the crime was divided into individual and organized one. Criminal of the first kind was called tat (thief; tatba, robbery), while the latter would be gusar (pirate, marauder). The gusars were considered bandits, who also loot and plunder public goods, rather than just private ones, and their crime was called najezda or grabež (raid or plunder, respectively). The horses used in the raid (najezdni konji, raid horses) were taken from the gang and divided in two: half for the state (that is, emperor) and half for the victim of the crime. As horse was an expensive commodity in medieval Serbia, it was used as a currency for damage payments. The plunderers themselves were hanged upside down. The state considered organized crime much more threatening to society. As the horses were expensive, regular thieves could rarely organize themselves to conduct horse raids, so the concern came from the acts of the noblemen, who had resources. They would often plunder the population and take lands that were not theirs and not given to them by the emperor. The ruler didn't want to allow them to control more assets than he gave them, or to let them form their own private armies. In accordance with this, the punishments for these crimes became harsher in time, including the death penalty as the later amendments to the code recognized the crime as being premeditated. The code was specifically forbidding the noblemen to plunder their own villagers, which was a common thing at one point.

There was one legal institute which was left to the local lawmen to be conducted by their free will, the institute of conciliation. It involved an agreement on resolving the dispute between the plaintiff and the defendant. Though this institute exists today in numerous legal systems, legal historians consider it a forced result of the state's weakness, that is, of the internal affairs apparatus which wasn't able to conduct proper investigations and produce evidence. Especially harsh provision were for the crime of betrayal against the state, called nevera (unfaithfulness). The complete assets of the person sentenced for betrayal would be transferred to the ruler, as the entire family had to pay for the crimes. In the case of the military betrayal, the punishment was death.

Among provisions and institutes in the Dušan's Code, some of the today unknown or unusual are:

- Bližike; The concept of private ownership was quite different in the Middle Ages compared to the modern ideas of this institute. The titular holder of the property wasn't one person who had all the rights, but the property was owned jointly by the entire family, sometimes including the distant relatives. The circle of relatives which had the right to limit the management of the assets, including the disposition of the property, was much wider than the circle which was nominally a titular on the possessions. This prerogative of the relatives to limit each other's rights was called bližike. For example, father had no prerogative to have the disposition right on the entire property, but only on "his share", which excluded the share which belonged to his children.
- Gradozidanije; The dependent classes had to fulfill the obligation of gradozidanije. It included the construction and fortification of new towns, reconstruction and repair of the damaged and desolate forts, ramparts and towers. The peasants would transport the stones to the locations, but they also had to help with the construction works. Though present since the early days of the Serbian statehood, it became common in the 14th century, especially during the reign of emperor Dušan. As he vastly expanded the state at the expense of the Byzantine Empire, numerous abandoned, damaged and razed Byzantine forts needed to be repaired. Byzantine emperor John VI Kantakouzenos wrote that during the reconstructions of the town of Ber, 10,000 people were employed.
- Mehoskubina; It was a fine charged for the twitching of someone's beard (skubež) during the physical altercation among the lower classes. Article 98 of the Code states that mehoskubina amounts to 6 Serbian perpers. Since Article 97 protects the dignity of the nobility and good people under the threat of severe mutilation, Article 98 continues in the same vein: the fine wasn't actually being paid to the indemnified party, but to his master cause it was his dignity that was tarnished. This is in line with the general direction of the Code, which concentrates on the fine itself rather than on the indemnifying party.
- Smuđenje; In the medieval Serbian and Dubrovnik law, there was a punishment of smuđenje, or scorching of a beard. It was a specific Serbian measure as the Byzantine law hadn't such a provision, but included the forcible cutting of a beard instead. As a nobleman's beard was a sign of dignity, it couldn't be scorched, unlike the beards of the lower classes. Dušan's Code (article 55) provided that a nobleman who insults the subordinated person should pay 100 perpers, but if a subordinated one insults the nobleman, he will pay the same amount but his beard will be scorched, too. Beard could also be scorched if a person attends the illegal assemblies or if it is a meropah (serf) who has escaped (article 69). Additionally, the leader of such an assembly or a meropah could also be punished with cutting of their noses in addition to scorching.
- Sok; In Serbian medieval and customary law, there was an institute of sok. It was a secret witness, who testified in front of the judicial organs, but his testimony was secret, while his personal identity might remain secret even from the judges. Testimony of the sok was paid, and court documents contained spending for the sok fees, called sočbina, though it wasn't paid by the court but by the plaintiff. The secrecy of the testimony wasn't diminishing its value as the courts were bent on finding the guilty person as quick as possible and for the process to be short.
- Zamanica; The state of zamanica was a medieval equivalent of a modern state of emergency. Declaration of zamanica meant that the ordered feudal obligations had to be fulfilled as fast as possible. When declared, it concerned the entire population. It was mostly declared because of the agricultural works, but sometimes because of the war efforts. Article 68. of Dušan's Code provided that the meropsi were obliged to work on noblemen's land for two days in a week, once a year to pay money to the emperor and to scythe one day per year, as part of zamanica. A chrysobull of the Banjska Monastery explains that zamanica is obligatory even for those dependent classes which are usually not mandatory to do it. On the first day, those who were capable to work with the scythe were mowing and later they would have to collect and stack the hay. Off course, they all had to do it for free.

=== Chivalry and tournaments ===
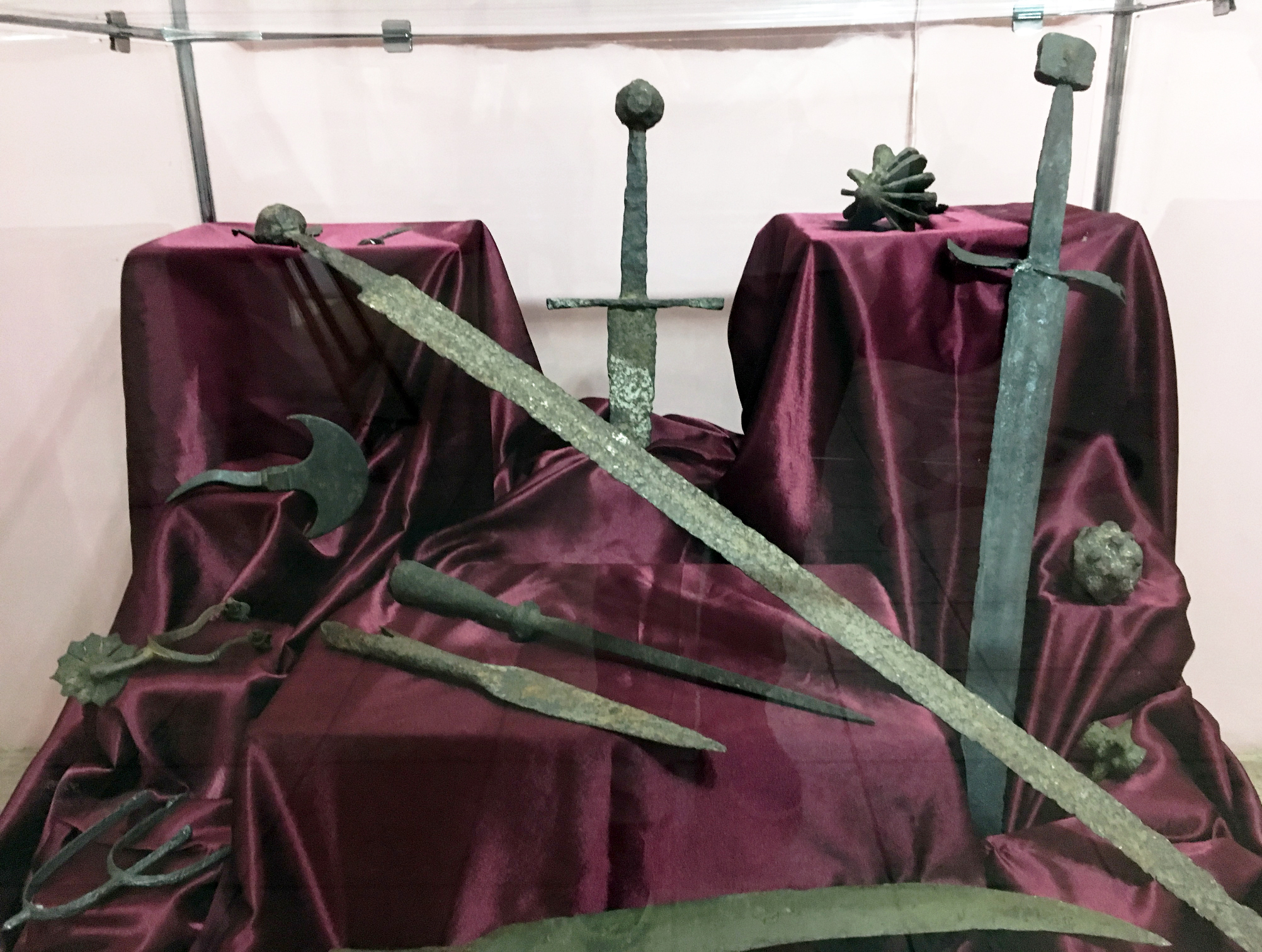
Medieval Serbian weapons

First orders of chivalry appeared in Serbia during the reign of Stefan Nemanja, in the 12th century. As the protector of the dynasty was Saint George, the main order was named after him. Hungarian Order of the Dragon spread over to Serbia in the 15th century. Despot Stefan Lazarević belonged to the highest order, while several other noblemen were members of the order's lower ranks. At first, all members of the orders of the knights were members of nobility. Young men were not only trained for physical and warrior skills, but were also taught philosophy, foreign languages or court etiquette. The most popular role models were heroes from the Antiquity, especially Alexander the Great. After coming of age, young nobles were settling in their patrimonies and pronoias, awaiting calls from their lords. The initiation into the order was usually conducted on the battlefield, either before or after the battle. First Serbian king who hired foreign mercenaries, as he couldn't mobilize enough domestic warriors, was King Milutin. They formed a special estate of the realm. Emperor Dušan also had a personal, foreign-based guard.

In his 1601 work The Realm of the Slavs, which was published in Serbia in 1968 with critical commentaries, Ragusan chronicler Mavro Orbini writes that Emperor Dušan practiced using all available weapons at the time, and that he expected from his lords the same. Orbini says that two types of knights games were organized at that period: đostre, or tournaments, and bagorde, or duels. Despot Stefan Lazarević also organized tournaments, but on a smaller scale. He personally was a participant in the grand scale tournament in 1412 in Buda, organized by Matthias Corvinus, King of Hungary. Historian Stojan Novaković, in his work "A monk and a hajduk" from 1913 describes the palace of the local lord Vitomir Gvozdenović in the 15th century: "On the convenient location, in front of the little town, there was a potecište, a place for racing and other heroic games, where men from the lord's house, and other houses, played and had fun all day long".

Chivalry games were the most popular fun among the nobility. The tracks were built in front of the castles or on the vast, low fields surrounding the settlements. The tournaments would last for several days, and could attract up to 2,000 spectators. The weaponry used in the duels was produced and forged in Serbia during the entire this period, and especially known was the famed Serbian sword or schiavonesca. The prizes were mostly monetary and were handed over to the winners by the highest lords in the state or the queen consorts themselves. Empress Helena often participated in gatherings and conferences, presiding councils made solely of knights. Princess Milica and her daughter Olivera often headed knightly entourages on their diplomatic missions. Milica's other daughter, princess consort and regent of Zeta Jelena Lazarević, fought against the Venetians and the Ragusans after the death of her husband Đurađ II Balšić in 1403 to 1409, when she handed over the throne to her son Balša III. Apart from waging war, she also provoked the opponents by smuggling salt, a commodity sold only by the Venetians and the Ragusans. In her testament, she left her full knightly armor, expensive vestures and a male, dragon shaped signet ring.

== Culture ==
=== Cultural interaction ===
Serbs, and other Slavic tribes encountered the Romanized population in towns after the settlement in the 7th century. The native population at first avoided the new settlers, but in time the trading and cultural ties developed, so as the mixing and blending of the population. As a result, numerous words at that time entered the Serbian language, directly from the Latin language, like the names of the plants (bosiljak, "basilicum", basil; kupus "composita", cabbage; lovor, "laurus", laurel; cer, "cerrus", Turkey oak), everyday objects (konopac, "canapus", rope; mramor, "marmor", marble; sapun, "sapo", soap; sumpor, "sulphur" sulfur; ulje, "oleum", oil) and animals (mazga, "muscus", hinny; kresta, "crista", crest). The blending of the population occurred at different pace and the Romanized population prevailed the longest in the maritime towns and locations on the Adriatic, some of which kept the original, Roman, names in Slavic rendering: Scodra = Skadar, Ulcinium = Ulcinj, Butua = Budva, Rhizon = Risan, Stagnum = Ston, Dormire = Durmitor, Visitor (from videre, vidi, visum; to see), Leotar (from leo; lion), Narenta = Neretva, Barbana = Bojana, Drinio or Dirnius = Drim, Cnetona = Cetina.

Some of the later, surviving Byzantine/Greek influences include the names of the region of Ljeviš, near Prizren (from Eleousa, Ἐλεούσα), Đunis ([Saint] Dionysios) or Stalać ([Saint] Theodore Stratelates). Slavic deities were later replaced and identified with the Christian saints, passing on them their original attributes. Among the Serbs, probably the best known example is the supreme god Perun, who, as also god of thunder, lightning, storms, etc., was blended with the Saint Elijah the Thunderer. Saint Vitus replaced Svetovid, god of war and fertility. Among the Serbs, the cult of the ancestors was particularly worshiped, so in accordance they especially venerated Dažbog, the supreme deity of the ancestors, the god of darkness and protector of the cattle and wolves, who was considered as the progenitor of the Serbs.

Discovered artifacts from the 7th to the 9th century show developed smithing of the tools. In the Batković they included knives, stone cutters, blade sharpeners and sickles, but also parts of the weaving frames, female jewelry made of silver, bronze and pâte de verre, combs, ceramic vessels, etc. In the remains of the Mogorjelo, near Čapljina (modern Bosnia and Herzegovina), lots of ceramics was discovered, but also the incomplete, luxurious gold-plated warrior belt from the second half of the 8th century. Though probably imported and Frankish in appearance, it is considered one of the most valuable findings from this period in the entire Slavic realm.

After settling, the Slavs repopulated some of the abandoned settlements from the late antiquity. Apart from previously mentioned early settlements, there are also remains in the habitats of Breza and Panik, near Bileća, both in modern Bosnia and Herzegovina, with the latter being in Travunija at the time. Serbian pottery from the 8th to 9th century was discovered in old Roman/Byzantine habitats, which Slavs reworked using wood and stone, in the dry stone building method. Apart from the ceramics (Mogorjelo, Gornji Vrbljani, Ston), in some larger settlements, the Slavic necropolises were discovered, like in Makljenovac. This was one of the former forts, repopulated by the Slavs, and they were mostly located at the border of the Pannonian Plain, which became the border zone with the Avars after Slavs split from them. Re-population of the forts in the eastern part of the Serbian settled areas came later, from the mid-9th century (Ras, Vrsenice (near Sjenica), Gradište (Kraljevo), Gradina (Jelica mountain), etc., which was probably a consequence of the approaching threat from the Bulgarian attacks.

In this period, western parts of the Balkan were partially held, and influenced by the Frankish Empire, leaving largest number of artifacts on the territory of early Croatian state, but also in Zachlumia, which may indicate that it accepted Frankish suzerainty. In other Serbian states, Frankish remnants and cultural influence are scarce.

In the 9th century, the Byzantine state was very engaged into the cultural and religious expansion among the newly settled people in the Balkans. In 864 they finally succeeded into Christianizing the Bulgarians, thus including them into their cultural sphere. Especially important for the history of the Serbian culture was the missionary work of Saints Cyril and Methodius which operated in Great Moravia since 863, introducing the original, Slavic alphabet and translating Byzantine religious and political works. This was the foundation of the Slavic literacy and literature, which soon profoundly influenced the Serbs, leaving major mark in their tradition and culture.

=== Literacy ===
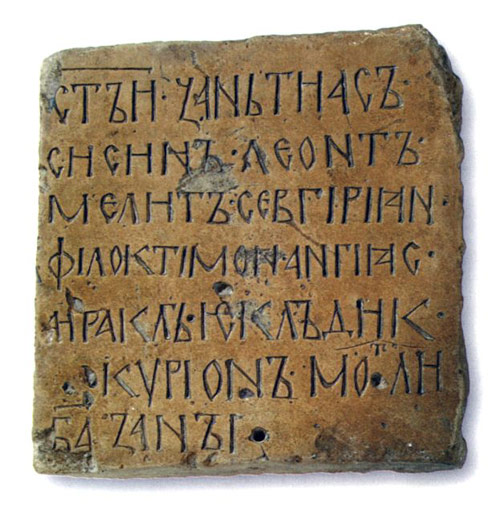
Temnić inscription, 11th century

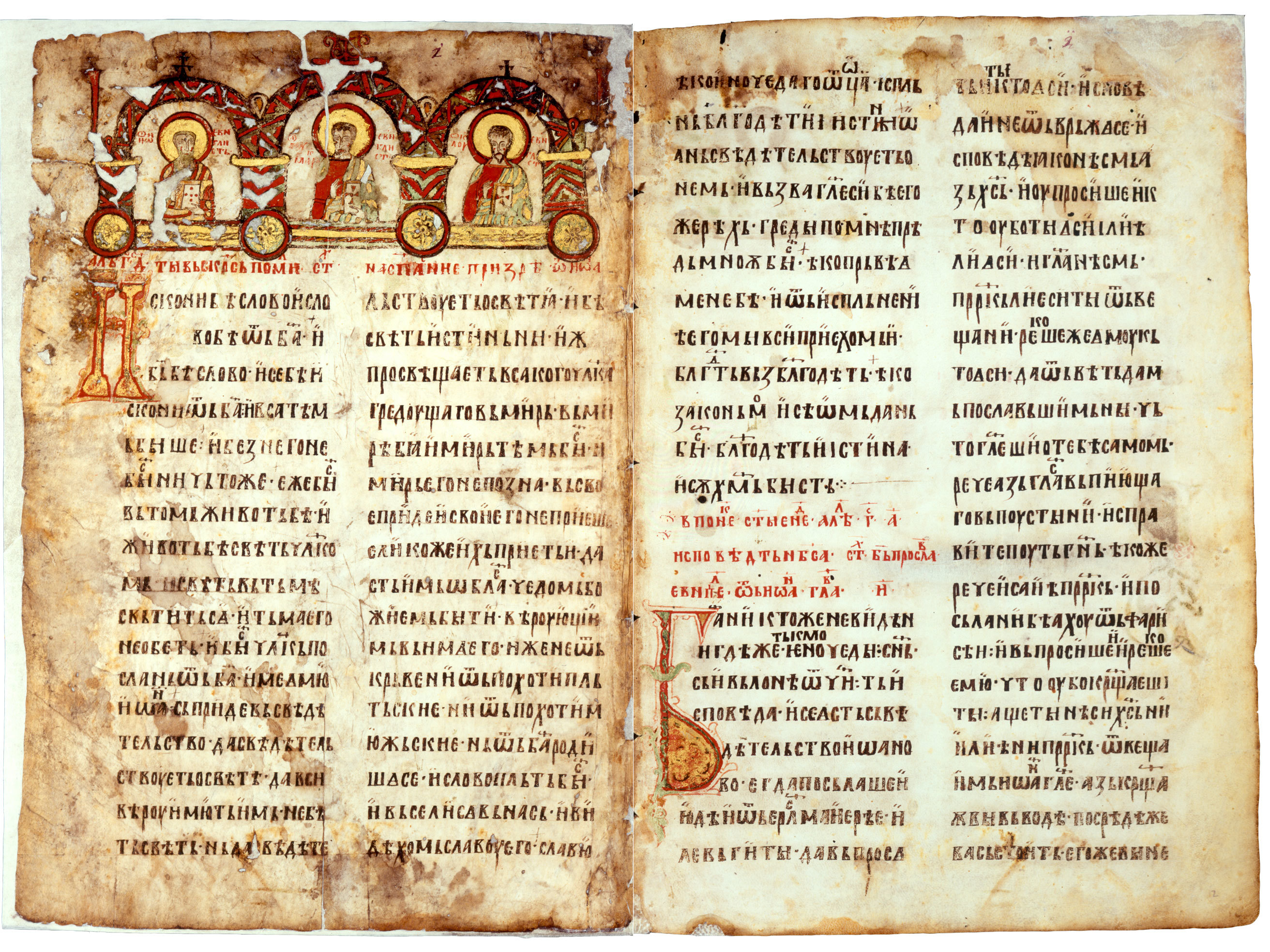
The Miroslav Gospel illuminated manuscript, 1180

Serbian medieval literacy was marked by the wide use of Cyrillic script, and the Serbian recension of the Old Slavic language. One of the main literary genres in medieval Serbia were hagiographies, known in Serbian as žitije (vita), that were written as biographies of rulers, archbishops and saints from the 12th up to the 15th century.

Originally, upon settling, South Slavs had no writing system, but according to the 9th century Bulgarian scholar Chernorizets Hrabar, they used "lines and cuts". Modern scholars refer to this marking system as the Slavic runes. With Christianity, Slavs of the Balkans also adopted new alphabets: in the west (Croats), the Latin script was used; in the central parts (Serbs), both Greek and Latin; in the east (Bulgarians), only Greek letters. The first attested Slavic script, Glagolitic script, was compiled by the Saint Cyril and Methodius in the 9th century. It is believed that the script reached Serbs quite early, in its both early redactions, Great Moravian and Pannonian, since Methodius was appointed to head the Archbishopric of Sirmium, which also had jurisdiction over the Serbian lands in the hinterland. Methodius was very active in promoting the script among the Slavs, organizing numerous missionary actions with his disciples in the massive effort to spread Christianity among the Slavs.

The oldest writing which could be originating from to the Serbian speaking region, though also claimed by other Slavic nations, is the Codex Marianus. The usage of certain letters and marks for certain sounds points to the Serbian language. The codex was written sometime between 1050 and 1075, on 174 pages of parchment. It was discovered in the 19th century at the Mount Athos and sent to Saint Petersburg, Russia, where it is still kept today. Examining the language used, just like the later, and much better known Miroslav Gospel, it obviously contains older texts written in Glagolitic and, later compiled, Cyrillic script. This points to the existence of, today unknown, Slavic literacy tradition.

Apart from the initial mix of scripts (Latin, Greek, Glagolitic, Cyrillic), there is one apparent historical oddity. In Breza, in central Bosnia, the inscription in Elder Futhark, variant of the Older Germanic runes, was discovered. Except for the Eastern Slavs, through the Varangian influence, Slavic people didn't use runes, especially not the South Slavs. Despite some theories, there is no universally accepted explanation. However, though discovered in the locality which corresponds to the Slavic settlement (7th–9th century), the inscription itself may predate it.

=== Religion ===
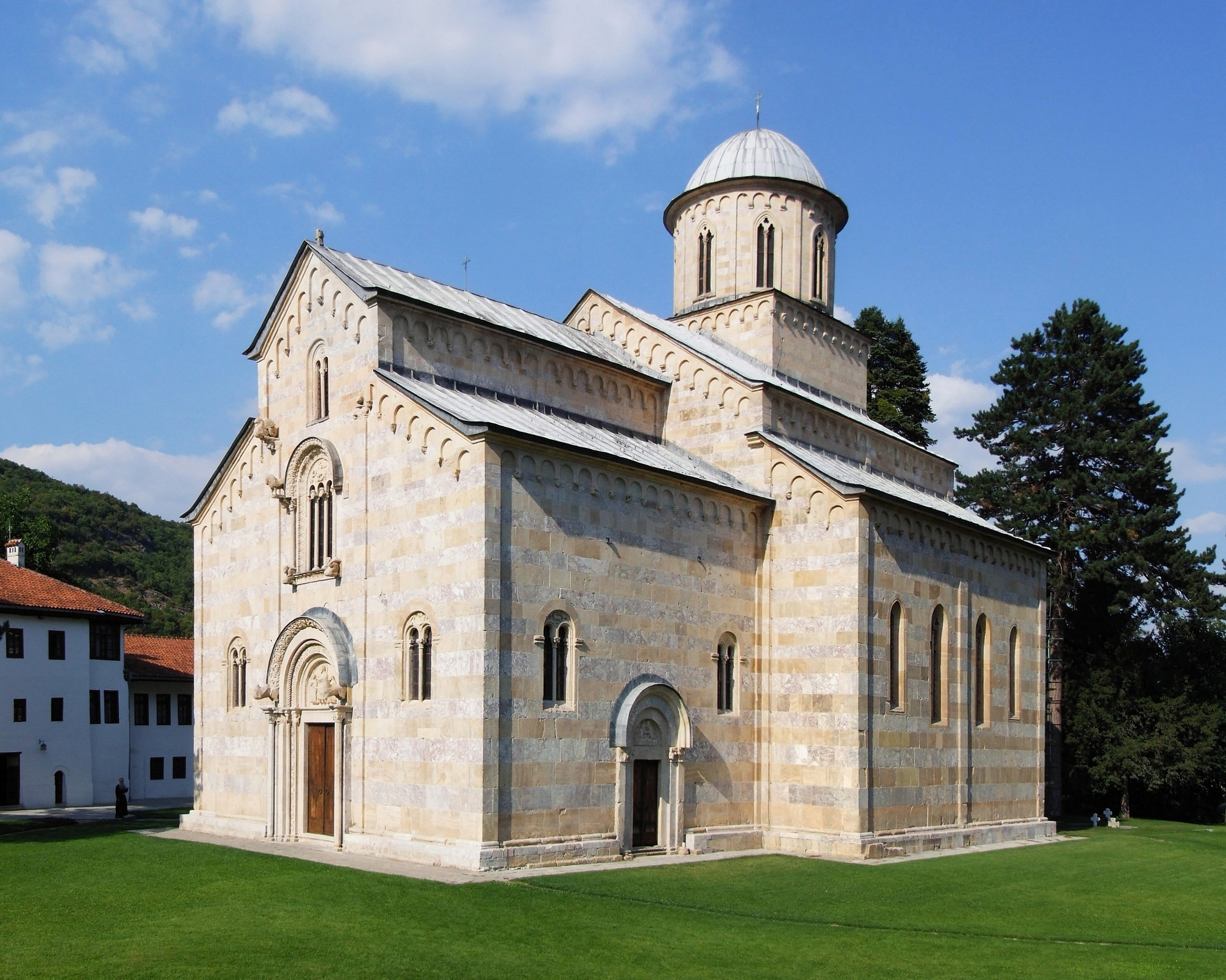
14th-century Visoki Dečani Monastery

After Cyril died in 869 in Rome, Methodius continued their work on his own. He was appointed the Archbishop of Pannonia in 870, and from this period (873) comes the letter from the pope John VIII in which he invited Serbian prince Mutimir to accept the competence of Methodius, in an effort to expand the jurisdiction of Methodius' bishopric. This was in collision with the strivings of the Patriarchate of Constantinople to place the area under its authority. The appetites especially grew larger when in 870 the entire newly established Christian church in Bulgaria was subdued to Constantinople. This way, the areas of Belgrade and Morava valley came under the Byzantine religious jurisdiction, and the Metropolis of Morava was formed. First data on the church organization date from the 10th century. During the reign of Bulgarian emperor Peter I (927–969), the Bulgarian Patriarch and the Bulgarian Orthodox Church administered not only the bishoprics in the Morava valley, but also founded the Bishopric of Ras. At the church Councils of Split, in 925 and 928, bishoprics in the Dalmatian cities of Dubrovnik and Kotor, bordering Serbian territories, are mentioned, so as the bishopric of Ston, which was part of Zachlumia. Ston was subordinated to the Archbishopric of Split.

By the mid-10th century, an Archbishopric of Dubrovnik seceded from Split and included Kotor, Zachlumia (Bishopric of Ston) and Travunija (Bishopric of Trebinje). In the second half of the 10th century the Bishopric of Duklja was mentioned, along with the bishoprics in the maritime cities of Bar, Scutari, Drivast, Pilot in the župa of the same name, and Gradac. Though their previous religious affiliation is not known, at this time they were all subordinated to the Metropolis of Dyrrhachium of the Patriarchate of Constantinople.

After the Byzantine reconquest (1018) and the establishment of the Archbishopric of Ohrid (1019), eparchies in Serbian hinterland were placed under its jurisdiction, thus coming under the heavy influence of the Byzantine Orthodox tradition. Primorje, Travunia and Zachlumia belonged to the Archbishopric of Ragusa, that was under the jurisdiction of the Church of Rome since the mid-10th century, while Duklja was originally under the jurisdiction of the Metropolitanate of Dyrrachium. After the Great Schism (1054) and the decline of Byzantine political influence in Serbian lands, cities of the southeastern Adriatic, such as Bar, Ulcinj, Scutari and Drivast were detached from the Greek Metropolitanate of Dyrrachium, and became subordinated to the Archbishopric of Ragusa. This was accepted and in a letter from 9 January 1078, where Pope Gregory VII mentions bishop of Bar as being subordinated to the archbishop of Ragusa.

Since 1219, Serbian Orthodox Church was reorganized as an autocephalous archbishopric, and in 1346 it was elevated to patriarchal rank, as the Serbian Patriarchate of Peć. Deeply influenced by Byzantine traditions, Serbian Orthodoxy played crucial role in religious and cultural life of medieval Serbian society. Religious influence was particularly strong on the development of sacral architecture and visual arts in Serbian medieval lands.

Population was obliged to support the church. The tax was called bir ("picked", "collected') and originally included only goods, mostly food. The tax was known as popovski bir or duhovni bir (priestly tax, or spiritual tax, respectively). In the 14th century, it was partially, and then fully, replaced with money. In the mid-14th century, during the reign of Emperor Dušan, it was recorded that Serbs pay lukno žita ili 2 dinara (one measure of grain or 2 dinars), while Albanians were paying half of that (poluknica ili dinar). It was a much lesser taxation, and easier to pay, than the vlastelinski bir or vladaočev bir (noblemen's tax and ruler's tax). The tax survived the Middle Ages. During the Ottoman occupation it reverted fully to being paid in food. It survived into the modern Serbian state after the liberation, being replaced with money again in the late 19th century. The verb ubirati, from the old bir, remained in modern Serbian language, still depicting the tax collecting (ubirati porez).

=== Education ===
There were three possibilities to get educated: with priests, with monks in the monastery or with the private tutors. The surviving sources can't point to which of this possibilities was the most spread. The modern idea of the school as the central institution in the educational system differs greatly from the education in the Middle Ages. The schools developed on specific locations, where the continual meeting of the students and teachers was possible. Each school was an educational entity for itself and the level was dependent on the qualifications and training of the teacher. Some traditional educational elements, however, were applied in different schools throughout the state.

=== Music ===
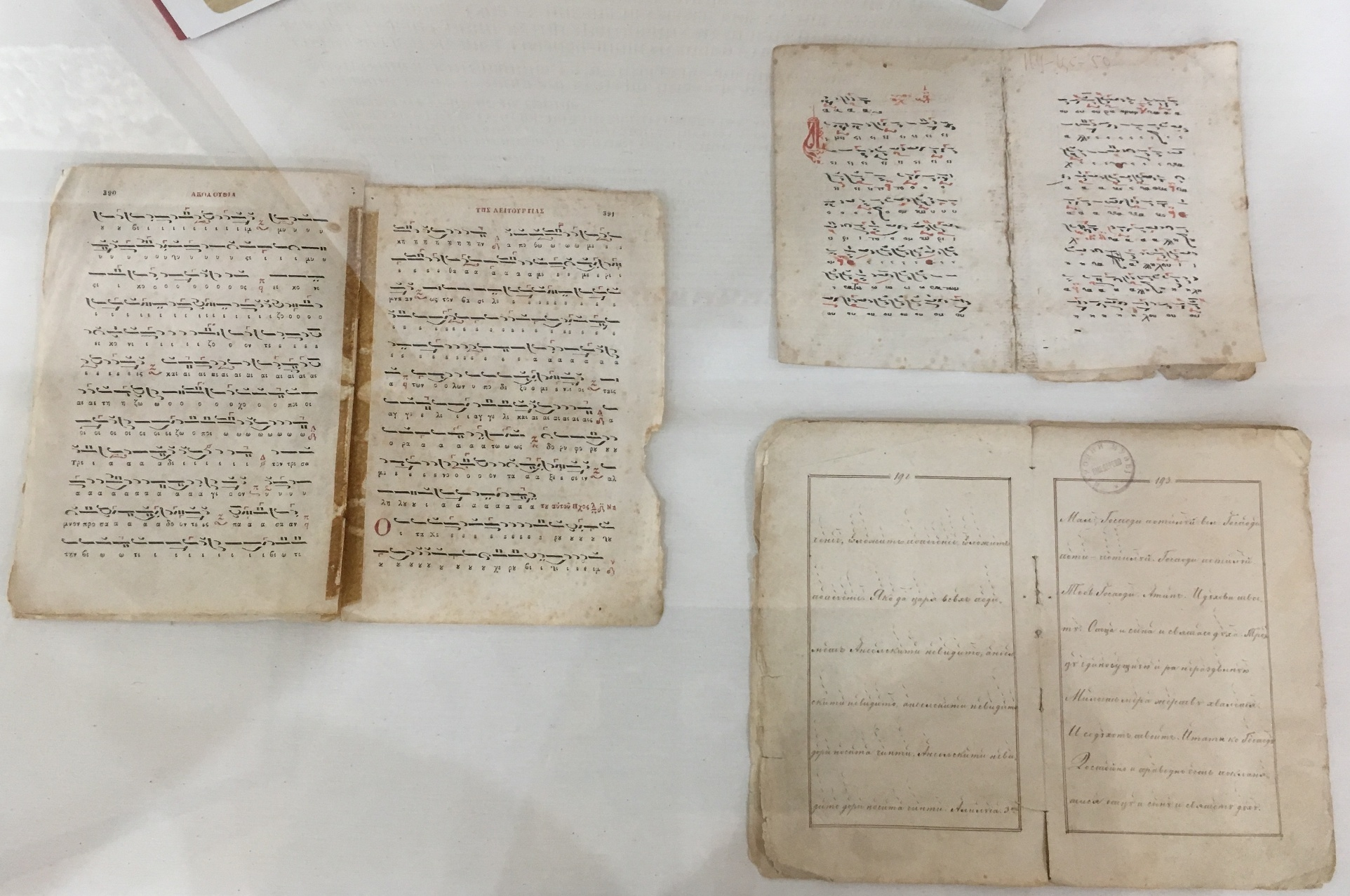
Neumes – medieval musical notes by composer Kir Stefan the Serb

Byzantine historians left testimonies about musicians, singers and players (trumpet, strings) among the South Slavs. Remains of the medieval tradition can be found in the songs and dances of the customs of dodola. After Saints Cyril and Methodius introduced the church service in the Slavic language, Slavic church music began to develop. Serbian music evolved within the Byzantine musical culture, from the 12th to the 15th century, but also continued to develop on the same basis during the later Ottoman occupation. The chanting was performed in one voice, both choral and solistic. The conductor, called domestik, pointed to the melodic flow with his hands. The main singer, protopsalt, was singing the shortened melodic preparation of the song at the beginning, which was the formula for the entire musical work. After that, he would begin to sing a song, in one voice, accompanied by the choir. In the case of melismatic melodies, the task of the choir was only to keep its drone tone, or ison.

=== Clothing and fashion ===
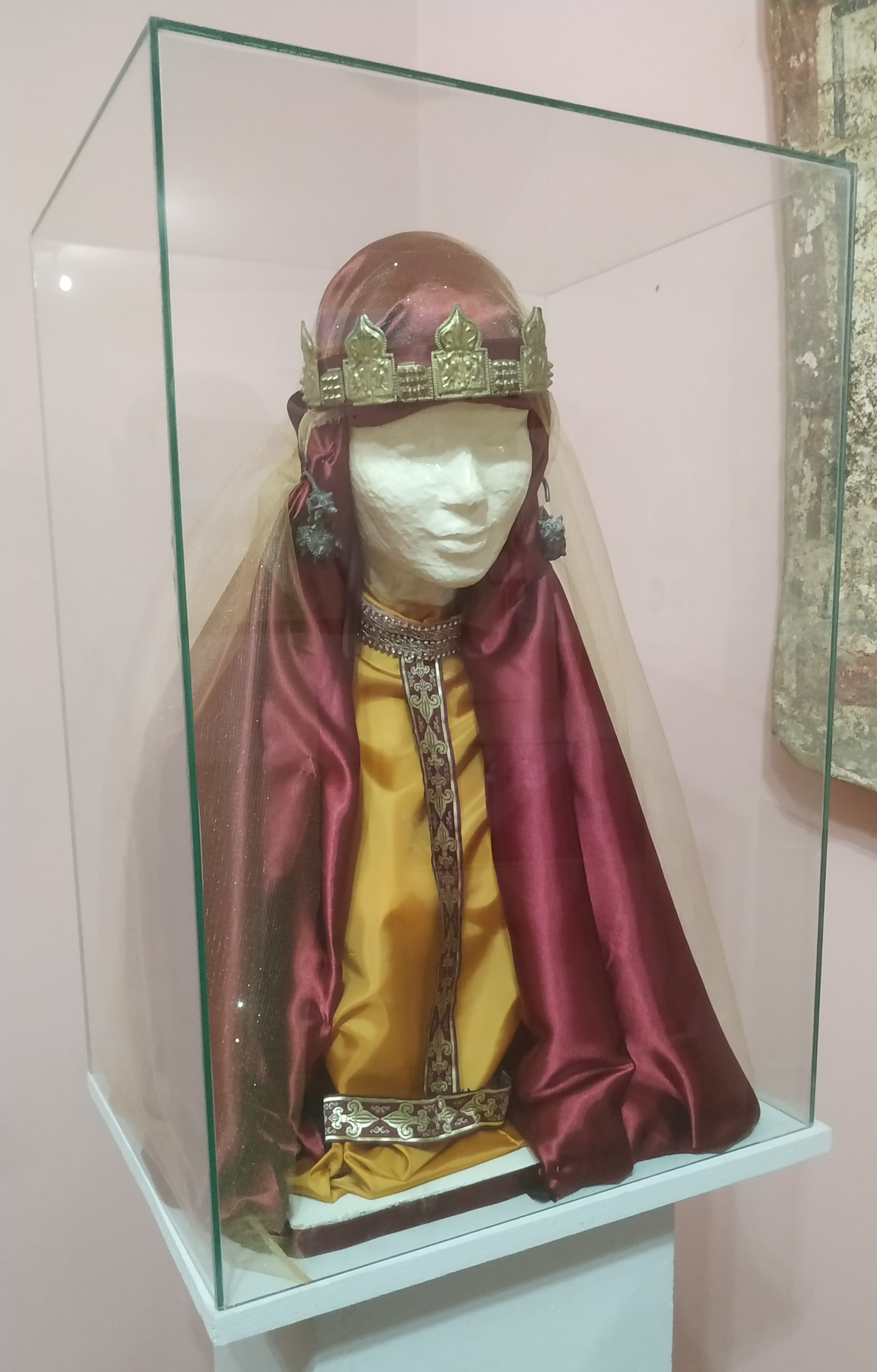
Serbian noblewoman headdress

In medieval Serbia, clothing and fashion was marked by social distinctions. The most used materials among the lower classes were wool, flax and hemp. Nobility used silk, velvet and taffeta which were imported from Italy, Greece and Flanders via Dubrovnik. In time, the weaving workshops began to open in Serbia itself. The silk was produced in Dečani and Prizren and domestic gold-woven fabrics appear at the court of Emperor Dušan. In time, the colored embroidery developed as the main characteristics of the Serbian medieval attire. The most expensive fabric was aksamit. It was type of a brocade, interwoven with gold, having a contrast basic colors of the warp and weft. Hazdija or bračin, was a type of velour or velvet. The expensive fabrics were especially handy as gifts during the diplomatic meetings. That way, some exotic fabrics reached Serbia, like hamuha or kamha, Middle Eastern, whole-colored fabric made of the sea silk, the threads produced by the pen shells. Olovera was a purple material, sometimes decorated with lion motifs. Pandaur included a batch of gold-woven textiles, while often mentioned faustan was a thin, cotton material for summer dresses. Influence of the Byzantine fashion was the strongest, while Western influence penetrated later, while the Ottoman impact became evident from the 15th century. There are no evidence that the luxury was forbidden, but there were instructions which ornaments and colors could be used at the court.

The attire was specific for each class and, in general, three different styles of robes can be differentiated: rural, urban, and noble/royal attire:

Rural attire

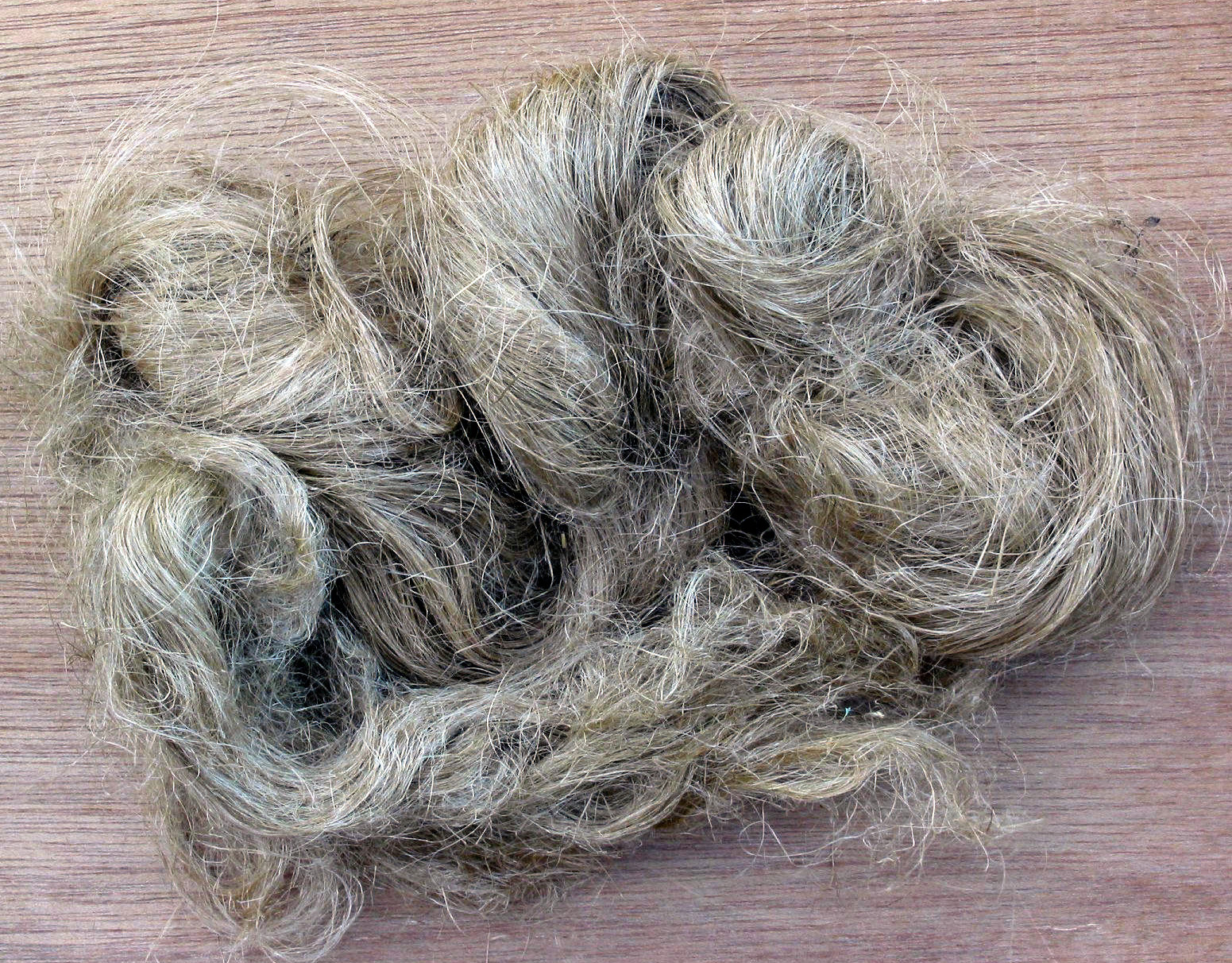
Hemp fiber, extensively used for the cloths by the commoners in the medieval Serbia

There are issues with the rural garment from this period as the written and artistic sources differ visually but also show the garment from different parts of the state and from different times. Earliest Slavic dress, both for men and women, consisted of rubaš, a long shirt made of coarse linen or hemp, which was often the only item of the costume. Married women would add an apron-type skirt (ponjava) over the lower part of rubaš, while over the top they would wear different types of short dresses. In modern Serbian, ponjava (поњава) means "coarse blanket", but in the old times it meant "to understand", akin to modern Russian понимаю. Girls would be allowed to wear ponjava only when they turn 15 after reaching maturity and acknowledging that they have understood they are grown up. A special ceremony was held in presence of the parents, cousins and friends. A girl would get on a bench, and mother would held a skirt saying to her daughter to jump into it if she understands that she is grown up. A girl would pretend to hesitate for a while, and then say ponjala ("I understood") and jump into the skirt. That way, the girl would announce she is ready to get married.

Additionally, men were wearing trousers. They were of different shapes and sizes and had numerous names: gaće, pelengaće, pelengiri, benevreci, bečve. They were made from hemp or flax with some reaching the lengths of the calves, some of the knees and some would cover only the thighs. A lower dress over trousers, the only other additional part of the garment during summer, was actually a rubaš shirt, which also had numerous other names: rubina, klinara, cjelara and rebrača. They were cut in different fashions and the most simple was klinara or cjelara. It had clothespins (klin) over both the front and back sides, straight cut, untailored sleeves and knee length. It was fitted by the belt at the waist and the shirt was partially pulled out, over the belt, as a puffy girdle (bauš). Over the shirt, a textile vest was worn, called klašnja. It could be with or without sleeves, and was covered with the wool or kostret (coarse goat hairs) dress. That top dress was used in the mountains even during the summer. After the cloth which was used (sukno) and the way it was prepared, it was called suknja (if the fabric was woven) or gunj (if it was rolled). It was of different lengths. In modern Serbian language, suknja is named for the women's skirt, while gunj is a thick, leather or fur, wool-padded vest which was often decorated with silver buttons. Sheep fur and leather were the most common so as some sorts of capes, blue or green. The cape with sleeves, made of fur, was called šuba. Hats included shallow caps, proper hats and winter, šubara hat. Footwear consisted of some rudimental type of opanak.

Urban attire The law on mines from 1412, issued by Despot Stefan Lazarević is the most important written source on the medieval Serbian urban attire. The law lists this types: (a) male and female woolen suknja (vest) with buttons; (b) male and female velvet barhan; (c) kuntuš, male top dress with hanging sleeves; (d) mrčni plašt, female top dress; (e) kavas, a suit embellished with embroidery, with hanging sleeves; and (f) svita, a ceremonial military suit. The transcription of the Law from the second half of the 16the century contains illustration with the portraits of the citizens – čelniks of the Novo Brdo mines. They wear long dresses, tall, bubble-shaped hats (klobuk) while some have insignia sticks. As they were symbol of a nobility, it appears that the top level of the citizen class were equaled with the nobility when it comes to the attire. Basic attire was similar to the rural attire. lower part attire, and of the entire body, was a linen or hemp made dress (basically, a rubaš), while the main top attire was still a sunkja, in urban attire called gonela. Another top clothing was mrčni plašt or mrčina, a type of cape with sleeves. More complex items were kuntuš and kavad, the latter better known as the part of the noble suit. Both were taken from the Byzantine fashion. Women from the cities were dressed equally to the noblewomen.

Noble attire The most widespread clothing among the nobles was kavadion or kavad, a type of tunic. It was a tightly tailored long dress, with either long or short, narrow sleeves. It was buttoned in front, and usually had gold-woven ribbons on the collar and along the entire length. First graphical evidence of kavadion was the scene from the Sopoćani Monastery which depicts the mourners in the death scene of the queen Anna Dandolo. A nobleman, standing next to the episcop, is depicted in blue attire with the golden waistband and next to him is a young man in the long, red kavadion, of simple tailoring and with long sleeves. On the sides, from the shoulders to the waist, the dress is hemmed with the golden ribbon, so as along the neckline. Next to him is a nobleman in the lower red dress with golden bracelets. He wears an upper blue dress, cut on both sides below the armpits, and is probably some kind of a cape, worn over the kavadion. Influenced by the Byzantines fashion, the attire was largely oriental in appearance, but in time Western influences also shaped it. The dress was long to the ankles or heels. The kavadion was in general richly embellished with the embroidery like the silk or silver threads (srma), while the puffy waistband, which was falling down on the hips, was sometimes adorned with pearls and gemstones. Across the tunic, a cape ornamented with the embroidery was worn. In front, it was held with needles, but often with very expensive fibulas. By the early 15th century, the dress became shorter, wider and hemmed with the fur, made from the luxury Italian and Flemish fabrics while the expensive furs, like ermine, became popular. The hats were tall, mitre-like, bedecked with the costly gemstones. This crown resembling hat was called čoja. The main footwear in this period were boots. Rich noblemen owned expensive full plate armor, made from various metals including silver. Lances were decorated and the elite's swords were embroidered with gemstones.

=== Jewelry ===
Production of the precious jewelry in Serbia dates from the early 13th century. It was influenced both by the East and the West. Originally, the western influence was prevalent, but by the end of the 13th century, the Byzantine influence became dominant. Byzantine impact included the filigree technique, which became quite common in Serbian goldsmithing. The best example of the mixed influences is the ring of Stefan the First-Crowned, the first Serbian king. Filigree was part of the national medieval heritage which became the most used technique in working with gold and silver after Serbia was conquered by the Ottomans.

== Economy ==
=== Agriculture ===
In one of the oldest Slavic settlement in the region, near Pančevo, archaeologists discovered that the main food were grains and millet, but some meat was prepared, too. However, findings in some other parts (village of Mušići, in the Drina river valley), show much higher share of meat in the diet (cows, game, sheep, goats, poultry). Later, the agriculture barely covered the needs of the total population and while the rich ones enjoyed in luxury, poor ones were constantly on the brink of starvation. Once vast forests were still home of the now extinct aurochs and wisent, which today survived only in Białowieża Forest, on the Poland-Belarus border. As population grew, especially from the 13th century onwards, the forests were massively cut down to clear land for the cultivation, so the natural world looked completely different in Serbia in the 13th than in the 15th century. In time, the agricultural tools were getting more sophisticated and the use of iron plow and fertilizers spread, which, on the other hand, further accelerated the clearing of the forests. Word hrana, meaning food, remained in use today, but some other names for food included pišta (which disappeared from language) and krma (which evolved in krmivo, fodder). Name used for dish in general was jedenie (modern jelo; jedenje means "eating"), lunch was obed which today means a meal in general (lunch itself is ručak), while dinner was called the same as today, večera. The vegetables were called zelje, which is today a name for patience dock. Onions and radishes were called "hot zelje". With the gradual arrival of the Ottomans to the Serbian borders, a cultivation of rice was introduced in border areas. Visiting Serbia in 1433, during the reign of despot Đurađ Branković, Burgundian Bertrandon de la Broquière wrote: "there is a town called Niš, in a very beautiful region, where rice grows a lot".

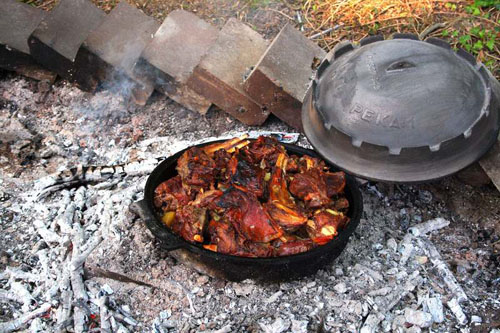
Modern rendering of the medieval cooking "under the sač"

Red-hot stones were used for cooking and boiling. This technique was especially used during the warfare or among those who spent lots of time alone (shepherds, later also hajduks etc.). Right away after milking (sheep, goats, cows), the milk would be poured in the hollowed pumpkin or a wooden container. The rocks were then heated above the fire and placed in the milk. Good cooks knew how much the stone should be heated for a given amount of milk. Larger pigs and lambs were prepared the same way. The heated stones were placed inside their bellies. When the belly was roasted, the food would be skewered on the spit. The vegetables were cooked in the same way. Heated stones were also used for the preparation of skorup, precursor of the modern kaymak, and rakija (brandy). Additionally, ashes and charcoal were sometimes used instead of the stones. On the other hand, after being killed the poultry was scalded with hot water. In the process of cooking or baking with heated stones, the food was half-dug into the ground and covered with a lid (sač). Cicvara was also made. It is a grains porridge cooked with skorup, which is today made from corn and kaymak.

Bread made from the mix of wheat, rye and barley, with added yeast was a base of the diet in medieval Serbia. It was also made from oats and buckwheat. Bread dough would be wrapped in the leaves of sorrel or great yellow gentian, placed on the live coal and covered with ashes. Porridges were often prepared, made from barley, oats and millet. Broths were prepared with the addition of vegetables, red wine or bread soaked in red wine. A whole array of vegetables (onions, garlic, beetroot, cabbage), fruits (apples, pears, plums, raspberries, hawthorns, blackberries, blueberries, mulberries, cherries, walnuts, grapes, hazelnuts) and mushrooms supplemented the everyday diet. The fruit was often dried (apples, plums, apricots). The food intake was enriched with milk and dairies, mostly goat's sirene cheese and skorup. With sour cabbage, skorup is today considered as the only autochthonous Serbian dish. Vlach sirene was more expensive than any meat. Meat itself was rarely eaten by the common people and was usually consumed during the festivals and religious holidays. Byzantine records write that the main food of the Serbian peasants were barley bread mixed with chaff, sorrel and sour cabbage. The lowest, poorest classes in general had a vegetable oriented diet as the meat was expensive and game hunting was allowed only for the noblemen.

Unlike rest of the population, all sorts of meat were abundant in the houses of the nobility or the royal court itself. Especially popular were game meat, fish, ram's meat, poultry, dried meat and bacon. Salted meat was also much used. Region of Pomorje provided sea fish, octopuses and salted ikra. Fish from the Zeta provided sea fish for the Studenica Monastery, as ordered by the ruling Nemanjić dynasty. All monasteries had to be supplied with fish and even during the Great Fast, in Hilandar Monastery octopuses, polyps and jellied sea fish were served. Despot Uglješa provided the monastery of Saint Athanasius with bivalves, cuttlefish and fish. Some regions rich in fish had an obligation to send fish to the court of Stefan Nemanja. Town of Bar supplied the court with the olive oil, and Dubrovnik, Kotor and Bojana with sea salt. After the conquest of Emperor Dušan and expansion of the state, Serbia acquired its own saltworks in Greece and Albania. Later, salt was purchased in Hungary and Wallachia. Through Pomorje, the court was supplied with other condiments, like pepper, wild thyme, common yarrow, mint, basil, saffron, cinnamon, clove and dill.

Main alcoholic beverage was honey rakija (medovača), while the honey wine, medovina, was popular until the late 15th century. Domestic ale in eastern Serbia was called alovina. Prince Lazar originally held the title of stavilac, which means he was in charge of the imperial cuisine during the reigns of emperors Dušan and Uroš. The process of obtaining malt from the grains, and the brewing process for producing beer were known. Beer production was apparently important as it was mentioned in various royal documents: king Stefan Vladislav's letter to the Bistrica Monastery (1230), the St. Stephen Chrysobull (1310) and the Gračanica Charter (1321) by king Milutin and king Stefan Dečanski's Dečani chrysobulls (1320s). The beer production completely ceased after the Ottoman conquest.

Byzantine statesmen Theodore Metochites describes the rich lunch prepared at the court of King Milutin, which consisted of the fish from the Danube, boar meat, venison, and bird meat. He also mentions other food served at the court, like other game (roe deer and rabbit meat), broths made from numerous birds (partridge, snipe, wild pigeon) and a special treat, pogača kneaded with honey. Aromatic wines and spring water were served, too. Dessert consisted of apples, pears, black and white grapes, figs (both fresh and dried) and watermelons, kept in the pit (trap), to stay cool. Other delicacies included: millet balls with porcini; squares of duck and goose meat cooked in the cauldron with black wine, honey and spices; prunes filled with goat cheese, covered with walnuts and baked under the sač; baked apples with walnuts and honey; barley balls with dried fruit.

Wine

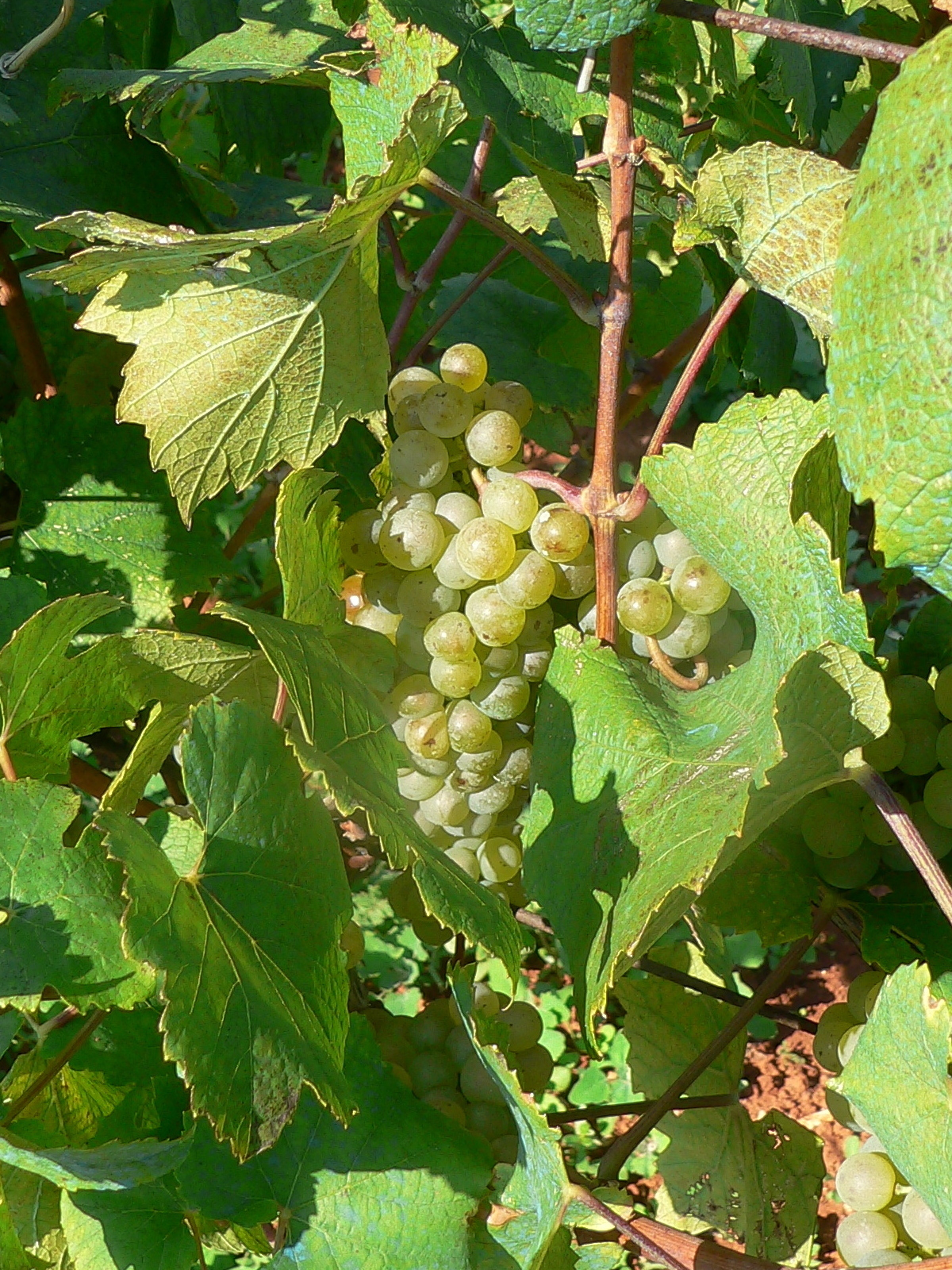
Malvasia grapes, one of the most popular varieties in medieval Serbia

When Stefan Nemanja issued the founding charter for the Hilandar monastery at the end of the 12th century, he bequeathed the vineyards in Velika Hoča to it. It is believed that the modern vineyards in Velika Hoča descended from those old ones. Other rulers also donated vineyards to the monasteries later, like kings Stefan Prvovenčani and Stefan Dragutin. The grapes were originally cultivated in Primorje, Macedonia and Metohija. Center of wine making in the Primorje was the town of Kotor, which was the center of the Saint Tryphon festivity, who is even today celebrated as the protector of wine makers. The largest wine-producing region was Metohija, and from the 14th century, the vineyards expanded to Vranje, Paraćin, Prokuplje and monasteries of Žiča, Manasija and Ravanica. Both the white and red wine were produced and the malvasia variety was among the most popular. It originated on Peloponnese but Venetians spread it along the Adriatic coast.

As wine is essential for the church rituals, monasteries had their own vineyards which were frequently mentioned in the charters. In the Law on mines, issued by despot Stefan Lazarević and dealing with the town of Novo Brdo, a tribute called psunja was to be collected for each wine brought to the city square to be sold. Only wine produced in the city metochion was freed from taxes and, apart from money collecting, the tribute served as a protective measure for the domicile wine production. Some of the even older wine provisions by emperor Dušan can be considered as the origins of the geographical indication, while mixing of wine and water was strictly forbidden.

After the expansion in the 14th century, the majority production moved to the central, Moravian Serbia. Vast patches of land were turned into the vineyards. In the 15th century, Constantine of Kostenets wrote: "many vineyards were planted, with such a great effort, in this country more than in any other", while De la Broquière noted that in the valleys of the Serbian state there are many villages and good food, and especially good wine. Turkish defters, after the Ottoman occupation in the mid-15th century, show how much the vineyards were spread and how much taxes were collected on wine and must. Fleeing from the Ottomans to the north, Serbs expanded the wine production in the area of Fruška Gora in Syrmia, which was a wine-producing region since the Roman period.

Beekeeping Special class of the commoners were ulijars. They were the bee keepers and collectors of the bee products on the feudal lordships. Ulijar had a duty to take care of the apiaries (ulijanik) which belonged to rulers, monasteries, churches or lords, and was relieved of all other feudal duties. It is recorded that during the establishment of the monasteries, the rulers would sometimes, among other gifts, donate ulijaniks with ulijars to take care of them. The bee keepers were much sought in this period as need for the bee products, especially the wax needed for the churches, was great and growing all the time. Also, honey and wax were expensive export goods. As ulijars were giving the 10% tribute in the products, that wasn't nearly enough for the entire state, so the number of ulijars grew. The Hilandar Monastery administered 15 apiaries throughout the state. Ulijars mostly lived within the agricultural settlements or outside of the villages, on the monastic properties suitable for the bee keeping, but a rare, small settlements consisting solely of the bee keepers also existed.

Tableware Tableware was diverse, influenced by the different regions and social status of the population. The food was served at the table or at sinija, also known as sofra, a short round or square table made of wood. In oldest periods, people were eating sitting on the ground. Later, people would sit around on the small logs, tripod stools or on a cloth, but the poorest continued to sit on earth. The tables in the homes of the gentry were covered with tablecloths. Different sources list golden, gold-plated and silver glasses. Despot Đurađ Branković personally sent 50 gold-plated glasses to Dubrovnik. Cutlery consisted of spoons, forks and knives, made of iron, corals, silver or being gold-plated. It was imported but also manufactured in Serbia. First dishes and tableware were made of wood. Later, the clay and stone came into use. Originally, both the rich and the poor were using wooden spoons. It is known that at the court of king Vladislav, in the first half of the 13th century, quite simple cutlery was used, both in the sense of the materials used and the craft of making it. Half a century later, during the reign of king Milutin, the tableware was already made from silver and gold.

=== Mining and money ===
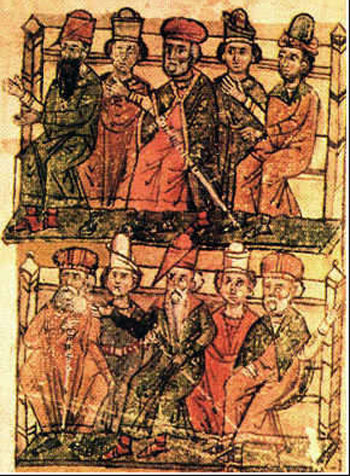
Illustration from a 16th-century manuscript copy of the Mining Code, issued by despot Stefan Lazarević

Mining was most important in the economy of the state, though it developed only in the 13th century and fully blossomed in the 15th century, amidst the most turbulent period in the state's history. The mining intensified the trading turnover, enhanced the building and expansion of the cities and empowered the citizens' class in them. At the beginning of the 15th century, Serbian respot Stefan Lazarevć (d. 1427) issued the Mining Code. The new relations and social forces, already turning traditional in the Serbian feudal society were nipped in the bud by the Ottoman destruction of the Serbian state. For the entire economy, and especially the mining, the period of primitiveness and regression began.

Mining town of Novo Brdo is considered one of the major examples of this. Described by Constantine of Kostenets as a "truly gold town" in the 15th century, gold and silver mine was surrounded by the town which had a population of 40,000 in 1434 (more than London, England). Due to its size and affluence, it was nicknamed majka svih gradova ("mother of all towns"). Novo Brdo had a sewage system and street lights. Miners worked 6 hours a day, had uniforms, their own mining anthem, music and flag, while two times a year they had right to go on a vacation, in which case they were awarded 3 gold coins "for the road". In that same year, there were 125 different consuls from foreign states and cities residing in Novo Brdo. The first legal document which regulated economic relations in mediaeval Serbia (Law on Mining) was adopted in Novo Brdo, by the orders of despot Stefan Lazarević. Though close to the location of the Battle at Kosovo in 1389, it succumbed to the Ottomans only 66 years later, in 1455. Despite greatness and richness, the mine survived only until the late 16th century, when the mining completely stopped.

During the rule of the Nemanjić dynasty, minting coins was one of the ruler privileges and the state had unified monetary system. First known coins were issued by king Stefan Radoslav (1227–1233). However, as the state weakened, the right was granted to local rulers, cities, church, etc. It is recorded that before the Battle of Kosovo, coins were minted by Prince Lazar, members of the Balšić family (Đurađ I, Balša II and Đurađ Stracimirović), brothers Jovan Dragaš and Konstantin Dejanović Dragaš, Marko Kraljević and his brother Andrijaš Mrnjavčević, their mother Jevrosima (or Jelena), but also some lower noblemen. Patriarch of the Serbian Orthodox Church also minted coins, so as some of the cities (Prizren, Skopje). Main ore mines and minting centers were Novo Brdo, Rudnik and Prizren. The Balšić family minted coins in Cyrillic in Prizren and in Latin in Zeta.

=== Trade and roads ===
Serbia inherited important Roman roads, like Via Militaris to Constantinople, which developed into Tsarigrad Road (section from the Great Morava's mouth into the Sava to Niš was called Morava Road). Other trade routes in the region developed in time: Dubrovnik Road (Dubrovnik-Hotča-Novo Trgovište-Kruševac-Niš); Scutari-Sofia Road; Zeta Road (Kotor-Belgrade); Kotor Road (Kotor-Zaslon; Gabela-Dmitrovica Road; Bosnian Road (Jajce-Travnik-Priština-Skopje-Maritsa Valley). Trading caravans (called turma), connecting West and East, were crisscrossing the state, importing salt, spices, medicines, arms, expensive fabrics, rare furs and citrus fruit, and exporting leather, honey, cheese and wax. The main trading route was from Dubrovnik, but merchants travelling Serbia included Arabs, Venetians, Greeks, and more traders from towns of Kotor and Bar. Trade agreements with Dubrovnik included the full protection for the merchants, freedom of trade, reimbursement in case of theft but also obligatory taxes and tariffs. Still, the caravans were often looted. In the case of dispute, the joint Dubrovnik-Serbian courts held jurisdiction.

Emperor Dušan established priselica, an obligation to host domestic dignitaries and foreign rulers and representatives. It was obligatory only in the rural areas, as towns had inns. Innkeeper was also in charge of keeping the goods and animals. If something would be missing during caravan's stay, he was obliged to pay the damage. Prior to king Milutin, Serbian rulers had no proper palaces but smaller, humble wooden edifices which were parts of scattered royal compounds. So even when such dignitaries, like Byzantine emperors, would visit, they would be hosted in tents in the royal yard.

== See also ==
- Principality of Serbia
- Grand Principality of Serbia
- Kingdom of Serbia
- Serbian Empire
- Serbian Despotate

== Sources ==
Primary sources

- Баришић, Фрањо; Ферјанчић, Божидар, eds. (1986). Византијски извори за историју народа Југославије. Vol. 6. Београд: Византолошки институт.
- Даничић, Ђура, ed. (1866). Животи краљева и архиепископа српских [Lives of Serbian Kings and Archbishops] (in Serbian). Zagreb.
- Failler, Albert; Laurent, Vitalien, eds. (1984). Georges Pachymérès: Relations historiques. Vol. 1. Paris: Les Belles Lettres. ISBN 9782251322308.
- Ферјанчић, Божидар (1959). "Константин VII Порфирогенит". Византиски извори за историју народа Југославије. Vol. 2. Београд: Византолошки институт. pp. 1–98.
- Flusin, Bernard; Cheynet, Jean-Claude, eds. (2003). John Scylitzès: Empereurs de Constantinople. Paris: Lethielleux. ISBN 9782283604595.
- Kukuljević-Sakcinski, Ivan (1875). Codex Diplomaticus Regni Croatiae, Dalmatiae et Slavoniae. Vol. 2. Zagreb.
- Кунчер, Драгана (2009). Gesta Regum Sclavorum. Vol. 1. Београд-Никшић: Историјски институт, Манастир Острог.
- Moravcsik, Gyula, ed. (1949). De administrando imperio. Pázmány Péter Tudományegyetemi Görög Filoĺ́ogiai Intézet.
- Moravcsik, Gyula, ed. (1967) [1949]. Constantine Porphyrogenitus: De Administrando Imperio (2nd revised ed.). Washington D.C.: Dumbarton Oaks Center for Byzantine Studies. ISBN 9780884020219.
- Nesbitt, John; Oikonomides, Nicolas, eds. (1991). Catalogue of Byzantine Seals at Dumbarton Oaks and in the Fogg Museum of Art, Volume 1: Italy, North of the Balkans, North of the Black Sea. Vol. 1. Washington, DC: Dumbarton Oaks Research Library and Collection. ISBN 0-88402-194-7.
- Острогорски, Георгије; Баришић, Фрањо, eds. (1966). Византијски извори за историју народа Југославије. Vol. 3. Београд: Византолошки институт.
- Острогорски, Георгије; Баришић, Фрањо, eds. (1971). Византијски извори за историју народа Југославије. Vol. 4. Београд: Византолошки институт.
- Parthey, Gustav (1866). Hieroclis Synecdemus et notitiae Graecae episcopatuum: Accedunt Nili Doxapatrii notitia patriarchatuum et locorum nomina immutata. Berolini: In aedibus Friderici Nicolai.
- Pertz, Georg Heinrich, ed. (1845). Einhardi Annales. Hanover.
- Rezar, Vlado, ed. (2001). Ludovici Tuberonis Dalmatae Abbatis Commentarii de temporibus suis. Zagreb: Hrvatski institut za povijest. ISBN 9789536324286.
- Scholz, Bernhard Walter, ed. (1970). Carolingian Chronicles: Royal Frankish Annals and Nithard's Histories. University of Michigan Press. ISBN 0472061860.
- Thallóczy, Lajos; Áldásy, Antal, eds. (1907). Magyarország és Szerbia közti összeköttetések oklevéltára 1198-1526. Budapest: Magyar Tudományos Akadémia.
- Thurn, Hans, ed. (1973). Ioannis Scylitzae Synopsis historiarum. Berlin-New York: De Gruyter. ISBN 9783110022858.
- Шишић, Фердо, ed. (1928). Летопис Попа Дукљанина. Београд-Загреб: Српска краљевска академија.
- Wortley, John, ed. (2010). John Skylitzes: A Synopsis of Byzantine History, 811–1057. Cambridge: Cambridge University Press. ISBN 978-0-521-76705-7.
- Живковић, Тибор (2009). Gesta Regum Sclavorum. Vol. 2. Београд-Никшић: Историјски институт, Манастир Острог.

Secondary sources

- Алексић, Марко (2020). Српске земље пре Немањића од 7. до 10. века [Serbian Lands before the Nemanjić Dynasty, from the 7th to 10th Century]. Београд: Лагуна.
- Ančić, Mladen (1998). "Od karolinškoga dužnosnika do hrvatskoga vladara. Hrvati i Karolinško Carstvo u prvoj polovici IX. stoljeća". Zavod Za Povijesne Znanosti HAZU U Zadru. 40: 27–41.
- Andrić, Stanko (2016). "Saint John Capistran and Despot George Branković: An Impossible Compromise". Byzantinoslavica. 74 (1–2): 202–227.
- Angold, Michael (2011). "The Latin Empire of Constantinople, 1204–1261: Marriage Strategies". Identities and Allegiances in the Eastern Mediterranean after 1204. Farnham: Ashgate Publishing Limited. pp. 47–68. ISBN 9781409410980.
- Babić, Gordana (1989). "Western Medieval and Byzantine Traditions in Serbian Art". Tradition and Modern Society: A Symposium at the Royal Academy of Letters, History, and Antiquities. Stockholm: Almqvist & Wiksell International. pp. 117–132. ISBN 9789174022025.
- Bajalović-Hadži-Pešić, Marija (2003). "Ornamentation of Medieval Serbian Tableware - Byzantine Heritage" (PDF). VIIe Congrès International sur la Céramique médiévale en Méditerranée. Athènes: Caisse des Recettes Archéologiques. pp. 181–190.
- Bataković, Dušan T. (1996). The Serbs of Bosnia & Herzegovina: History and Politics. Paris: Dialogue. ISBN 9782911527104.
- Bataković, Dušan T., ed. (2005). Histoire du peuple serbe [History of the Serbian People] (in French). Lausanne: L'Age d'Homme. ISBN 9782825119587.
- Birnbaum, Henrik (1972). "Byzantine Tradition Transformed: The Old Serbian Vita". Aspects of the Balkans: Continuity and Change. The Hague and Paris: Mouton. pp. 243–284.
- Blagojević, Miloš (1993). "On the National Identity of the Serbs in the Middle Ages". Serbs in European Civilization. Belgrade: Nova, Serbian Academy of Sciences and Arts, Institute for Balkan Studies. pp. 20–31. ISBN 9788675830153.
- Bogdanović, Dimitrije (1986) [25 December 1984]. The Kosovo Question Past and Present. Serbian Academy Of Sciences And Arts Monographs. Vol. DLXVI. Belgrade.
- Bubalo, Đorđe (2014). Pragmatic Literacy in Medieval Serbia. Turnhout: Brepols. ISBN 9782503549613.
- Budak, Neven (1994). Prva stoljeća Hrvatske (PDF). Zagreb: Hrvatska sveučilišna naklada. Archived from the original (PDF) on 2019-05-04.
- Budak, Neven (2018). Hrvatska povijest od 550. do 1100 [Croatian history from 550 until 1100]. Leykam international. ISBN 978-953-340-061-7. Archived from the original on 2022-10-03.
- Bulić, Dejan. "The Fortifications of the Late Antiquity and the Early Byzantine Period on the Later Territory of the South-Slavic Principalities, and their re-occupation". In Rudić (2013), pp. 137–234.
- Čanak-Medić, Milka; Todić, Branislav (2017). The Monastery of the Patriarchate of Peć. Novi Sad: Platoneum, Beseda. ISBN 9788685869839.
- Carter, Francis W. (1969). "An Analysis of the Medieval Serbian Oecumene: A Theoretical Approach". Geografiska Annaler. Series B: Human Geography. 51 (1–2): 39–56. doi:10.1080/04353684.1969.11879331.
- Ćirković, Sima; Korać, Vojislav; Babić, Gordana (1986). Studenica Monastery. Belgrade: Jugoslovenska revija.
- Ćirković, Sima (2004). The Serbs. Malden: Blackwell Publishing. ISBN 9781405142915.
- Ćirković, Sima (2014) [1964]. "The Double Wreath: A Contribution to the History of Kingship in Bosnia". Balcanica (45): 107–143. doi:10.2298/BALC1445107C.
- Crnčević, Dejan. "Architecture of Cathedral Churches on the Eastern Adriatic Coast at the Time of the First Principalities of South Slavs (9th-11th Centuries)". In Rudić (2013), pp. 37–136.
- Ćurčić, Slobodan (1979). Gračanica: King Milutin's Church and Its Place in Late Byzantine Architecture. Pennsylvania State University Press. ISBN 9780271002187.
- Curta, Florin (2001). The Making of the Slavs: History and Archaeology of the Lower Danube Region, c. 500–700. Cambridge: Cambridge University Press. ISBN 9781139428880.
- Curta, Florin (2006). Southeastern Europe in the Middle Ages, 500–1250. Cambridge: Cambridge University Press. ISBN 978-0-521-81539-0.
- Curta, Florin (2019). Eastern Europe in the Middle Ages (500-1300). Leiden and Boston: Brill. ISBN 9789004395190.
- Dimnik, Martin (1995). "Kievan Rus', the Bulgars and the southern Slavs, c. 1020-c. 1200". The New Cambridge Medieval History. Vol. 4/2. Cambridge: Cambridge University Press. pp. 254–276. ISBN 9780521414111.
- Dragnich, Alex N., ed. (1994). Serbia's Historical Heritage. New York: Columbia University Press. ISBN 9780880332446.
- Dragnich, Alex N. (2004). Serbia Through the Ages. Boulder: East European Monographs. ISBN 9780880335416.
- Dragojlović, Dragoljub (1990). "Dyrrachium et les Évéchés de Doclea jusqu'a la fondation de l'Archevéche de Bar" (PDF). Balcanica (21): 201–209.
- Dragojlović, Dragoljub (1991). "Archevéché d'Ohrid dans la hiérarchie des grandes églises chrétiennes" (PDF). Balcanica (22): 43–55.
- Dragojlović, Dragoljub (1993). "Serbian Spirituality in the 13th and 14th Centuries and Western Scholasticism". Serbs in European Civilization. Belgrade: Nova, Serbian Academy of Sciences and Arts, Institute for Balkan Studies. pp. 32–40. ISBN 9788675830153.
- Ducellier, Alain (1999). "Albania, Serbia and Bulgaria". The New Cambridge Medieval History. Vol. 5. Cambridge: Cambridge University Press. pp. 779–795. ISBN 9780521362894.
- Ducellier, Alain (2008). "Balkan Powers: Albania, Serbia and Bulgaria (1200-1300)". The Cambridge History of the Byzantine Empire c. 500–1492. Cambridge: Cambridge University Press. pp. 779–802. ISBN 9780521832311.
- Đurić, Vojislav J. (1993). "The European Scope of Painting in Medieval Serbia". Serbs in European Civilization. Belgrade: Nova, Serbian Academy of Sciences and Arts, Institute for Balkan Studies. pp. 72–89. ISBN 9788675830153.
- Đurić-Klajn, Stana (1972). A Survey of Serbian Music Through the Ages. Belgrade: Association of Composers of Serbia.
- Dvornik, Francis (1962). The Slavs in European History and Civilization. New Brunswick: Rutgers University Press. ISBN 9780813507996.
- Engel, Pál (2001). The Realm of St. Stephen: A History of Medieval Hungary, 895-1526. London & New York: I.B.Tauris. ISBN 9781850439776.
- Ferjančić, Božidar; Maksimović, Ljubomir (2014). "Sava Nemanjić and Serbia between Epiros and Nicaea". Balcanica (45): 37–54. doi:10.2298/BALC1445037F. hdl:21.15107/rcub_dais_12894.
- Fine, John V. A. Jr. (1991) [1983]. The Early Medieval Balkans: A Critical Survey from the Sixth to the Late Twelfth Century. Ann Arbor: University of Michigan Press. ISBN 0-472-08149-7.
- Fine, John V. A. (1994) [1987]. The Late Medieval Balkans: A Critical Survey from the Late Twelfth Century to the Ottoman Conquest. Ann Arbor, Michigan: University of Michigan Press. ISBN 978-0-472-10079-8.
- Fine, John Van Antwerp Jr. (2005). When Ethnicity Did Not Matter in the Balkans: A Study of Identity in Pre-Nationalist Croatia, Dalmatia, and Slavonia in the Medieval and Early-Modern Periods. Ann Arbor, Michigan: University of Michigan Press. ISBN 0472025600.
- Gál, Judit (2013). "IV. Béla és I. Uroš szerb uralkodó kapcsolata" [The Relationship of Kings Béla IV of Hungary and Uroš I of Serbia]. Századok (in Hungarian). 147 (2): 471–499.
- Goldstein, Ivo (1984). Ponovno o Srbima u Hrvatskoj u 9. stoljeću [Again on Serbs in the 9th century Croatia]. Zagreb: Historijski zbornik, god. XXXVII (1).
- Goldstein, Ivo (1995). Hrvatski srednji vek [Croatian Middle Ages]. Zagreb: Zavod za hrvatsku povijest Filozofskog fakulteta Sveučilišta u Zagrebu.
- Gračanin, Hrvoje (2008). "Od Hrvata pak koji su stigli u Dalmaciju odvojio se jedan dio i zavladao Ilirikom i Panonijom: Razmatranja uz DAI c. 30, 75-78" [Of the Croats who arrived in Dalmatia, however, a part separated and ruled Illyricum and Pannonia: Considerations with DAI c. 30, 75-78]. Povijest U Nastavi (in Croatian). VI (11): 67–76.
- Gračanin, Hrvoje (2012). "Guduskani/Guduščani - Gačani: promišljanja o etnonimu Gačani i horonimu Gacka u svjetlu ranosrednjovjekovnih narativa i suvremenih historiografskih tumačenja" [The Guduskani/Guduščani-Gačani: Considerations about the Ethnonym Gačani and the Choronym Gacka in Light of the Early Medieval Narratives and Modern Historiographic Interpretations]. Gacka i Otočac u srednjem vijeku (in Croatian). Institut društvenih znanosti Ivo Pilar. pp. 49–68. ISBN 978-953-6666-96-6. Archived from the original on 2016-03-04.
- Gavrilović, Zaga (2001). Studies in Byzantine and Serbian Medieval Art. London: The Pindar Press. ISBN 9781899828340.
- Grickat-Radulović, Irena (1993). "Serbian Medieval Literary Language". Serbs in European Civilization. Belgrade: Nova, Serbian Academy of Sciences and Arts, Institute for Balkan Studies. pp. 146–150. ISBN 9788675830153.
- Heather, Peter (2010). Empires and Barbarians: The Fall of Rome and the Birth of Europe. Oxford University Press. ISBN 978-0-19-974163-2.
- Hupchick, Dennis P. (2002). The Balkans: From Constantinople to Communism. New York: Palgrave. ISBN 9780312299132.
- Hupchick, Dennis P. (2017). The Bulgarian-Byzantine Wars for Early Medieval Balkan Hegemony: Silver-Lined Skulls and Blinded Armies. New York: Springer. ISBN 9783319562063.
- Isailović, Neven (2016). "Living by the Border: South Slavic Marcher Lords in the Late Medieval Balkans (13th-15th Centuries)". Banatica. 26 (2): 105–117. Archived from the original on 2022-12-12.
- Isailović, Neven (2017). "Legislation Concerning the Vlachs of the Balkans Before and After Ottoman Conquest: An Overview". State and Society in the Balkans Before and After Establishment of Ottoman Rule. Belgrade: The Institute of History. pp. 25–42. ISBN 9788677431259.
- Isailović, Neven G.; Krstić, Aleksandar R. (2015). "Serbian Language and Cyrillic Script as a Means of Diplomatic Literacy in South Eastern Europe in 15th and 16th Centuries". Literacy Experiences concerning Medieval and Early Modern Transylvania. Cluj-Napoca: George Bariţiu Institute of History. pp. 185–195.
- Ivanišević, Vujadin; Krsmanović, Bojana (2013). "Byzantine Seals from the Ras Fortress" (PDF). Зборник Радова Византолошког Института. 50 (1): 449–460. doi:10.2298/ZRVI1350449I.
- Ivanović, Miloš (2016). "Foreigners in the Service of Despot Đurađ Branković on Serbian territory". Banatica. 26 (2): 257–268.
- Ivanović, Miloš (2019). "Serbian Hagiographies on the Warfare and Political Struggles of the Nemanjić Dynasty (from the Twelfth to Fourteenth Century)". Reform and Renewal in Medieval East and Central Europe: Politics, Law and Society. Cluj-Napoca: Romanian Academy, Center for Transylvanian Studies. pp. 103–129.
- Ivanović, Miloš (2019b). "Militarization of the Serbian State under Ottoman Pressure". Hungarian Historical Review. 8 (2): 390–410.
- Ivanović, Miloš; Isailović, Neven (2015). "The Danube in Serbian-Hungarian Relations in the 14th and 15th Centuries". Tibiscvm: Istorie–Arheologie. 5: 377–393.
- Ivić, Pavle, ed. (1995). The History of Serbian Culture. Edgware: Porthill Publishers. ISBN 9781870732314.
- Jakovljević, Andrija (1984). "Musical Works of Serbian Composers Stefan and Nikola the Serb from 14th C - Bilingual Anthology of Great Laura (E-108)" (PDF). Balcanica (15): 69–82.
- Janićijević, Jovan, ed. (1998). The Cultural Treasury of Serbia. Belgrade: Idea, Vojnoizdavački zavod, Markt system. ISBN 9788675470397.
- Janković, Đorđe (2004). "The Slavs in the 6th Century North Illyricum". Гласник Српског Археолошког Друштва. 20: 39–61.
- Janković, Đorđe (2015). "О славянизации Северной Иллирии и Далмации" [On Slavisation of Northern Illyria and Dalmatia]. Stratum Plus (in Russian) (5): 249–283.
- Jireček, Constantin (1911). Geschichte der Serben. Vol. 1. Gotha: Perthes.
- Jireček, Constantin (1918). Geschichte der Serben. Vol. 2. Gotha: Perthes.
- Kalavrezou, Ioli (1997). "Helping Hands for the Empire: Imperial Ceremonies and the cult of Relics at the Byzantine Court". Byzantine Court Culture from 829 to 1204. Washington: Dumbarton Oaks Research Library and Collection. pp. 53–79. ISBN 9780884023081.
- Kalić, Jovanka (1995). "Rascia – The Nucleus of the Medieval Serbian State". The Serbian Question in the Balkans. Belgrade: Faculty of Geography. pp. 147–155.
- Kalić, Jovanka (2014). "A Millennium of Belgrade (Sixth-Sixteenth Centuries): A Short Overview" (PDF). Balcanica (45): 71–96. doi:10.2298/BALC1445071K.
- Kalić, Jovanka (2016). "Grand Župan Uroš II of Rascia" (PDF). Balcanica (47): 75–96. doi:10.2298/BALC1647075K.
- Kalić, Jovanka (2017). "The First Coronation Churches of Medieval Serbia" (PDF). Balcanica (48): 7–18. doi:10.2298/BALC1748007K.
- Kalić, Jovanka (2019). "Information about Belgrade in Constantine VII Porphyrogenitus" (PDF). Balcanica (50): 33–38. doi:10.2298/BALC1950033K.
- Kardaras, Georgios (2011). "The Settlement of the Croats and Serbs on the Balkans in the Frame of the Byzantine-Avar Conflicts" (PDF). България, българите и Европа - мит, история, съвремие. Vol. 4. Велико Търново: Университетско издателство Св. Кирил и Методий. pp. 91–98.
- Kartalija, Nebojša (2020). "The Perception of the Balkans in Western Travel Literature from the Eleventh to the Fourteenth Century". Voyages and Travel Accounts in Historiography and Literature. Vol. 1. Budapest: Trivent. pp. 141–165.
- Katičić, Radoslav (1990). Pretorijanci kneza Borne [Praetorians of prince Borna]. ShP 20.
- Klaić, Nada (1971). Povijest Hrvata u ranom Srednjem vijeku [History of the Croats in the early Middle Ages]. Zagreb: Školska knjiga.
- Komatina, Ivana (2016). Црква и држава у српским земљама од XI до XIII века [Church and State in the Serbian Lands from the XIth to the XIIIth Century]. Београд: Institute of History. ISBN 9788677431136.
- Komatina, Predrag (2010). "The Slavs of the mid-Danube basin and the Bulgarian expansion in the first half of the 9th century" (PDF). Зборник Радова Византолошког Института. 47: 55–82.
- Komatina, Predrag (2014). "Settlement of the Slavs in Asia Minor During the Rule of Justinian II and the Bishopric των Γορδοσερβων" (PDF). Београдски Историјски Гласник: Belgrade Historical Review. 5: 33–42.
- Komatina, Predrag (2015). "The Church in Serbia at the Time of Cyrilo-Methodian Mission in Moravia". Cyril and Methodius: Byzantium and the World of the Slavs. Thessaloniki: Dimos. pp. 711–718.
- Komatina, Predrag (2016b). "Military, Administrative and Religious Strongholds on the Danubian Frontier: The Example of Morava and Braničevo". Processes of Byzantinisation and Serbian Archaeology. Belgrade: Institute for Byzantine Studie. pp. 103–107.
- Komatina, Predrag (2019). "Constantine Porphyrogenitus, De Administrando Imperio and the Byzantine Historiography of the Mid-10th Century" (PDF). Зборник Радова Византолошког Института. 56: 39–68.
- Korać, Vojislav (1993). "Serbian Architecture Between Byzantium and the West". Serbs in European Civilization. Belgrade: Nova, Serbian Academy of Sciences and Arts, Institute for Balkan Studies. pp. 90–114. ISBN 9788675830153.
- Kovačević-Kojić, Desanka (2014). "On the Composition and Processing of Precious Metals mined in Medieval Serbia" (PDF). Balcanica (45): 97–106. doi:10.2298/BALC1445097K.
- Kovačević-Kojić, Desanka (2019). "Serbian Silver at the Venetian Mint in the First Half of the Fifteenth Century" (PDF). Balcanica (50): 57–71. doi:10.2298/BALC1950057K.
- Krekić, Bariša (1992). "Medieval Serbia: The Nemanyids and Byzantium". Byzantine Studies: Essays on the Slavic World and the Eleventh Century. New York: Aristide D. Caratzas. pp. 43–52. ISBN 9780892415175.
- Kršljanin, Nina (2017). "Interrupted Evolution: The Serbian Medieval Assembly (Sabor)". Parliaments, Estates & Representation. 37 (1): 1–16. doi:10.1080/02606755.2016.1260818. S2CID 151704989.
- Krsmanović, Bojana (2008). The Byzantine Province in Change: On the Threshold Between the 10th and the 11th Century. Belgrade: Institute for Byzantine Studies. ISBN 9789603710608.
- Krstić, Aleksandar R. (2016). "The Rival and the Vassal of Charles Robert of Anjou: King Vladislav II Nemanjić". Banatica. 26 (2): 33–51.
- Krstić, Aleksandar R. (2017). "Which Realm will You Opt for? – The Serbian Nobility Between the Ottomans and the Hungarians in the 15th Century". State and Society in the Balkans Before and After Establishment of Ottoman Rule. Belgrade: Institute of History, Yunus Emre Enstitüsü Turkish Cultural Centre. pp. 129–163. ISBN 9788677431259.
- Krstić, Aleksandar R. (2019). "Familiares of the Serbian despots in and from the territory of Banat (1411-1458)". Politics and Society in the Central and South-Eastern Europe (13th-16th centuries). Cluj-Napoca: Editura Mega. pp. 93–109.
- Krstić, Đurica (1981). "Symbols in Customary Law" (PDF). Balcanica (12): 117–130.
- Krstić, Đurica (1993). "Serbian Medieval Law and the Development of Law in Subsequent Periods". Serbs in European Civilization. Belgrade: Nova, Serbian Academy of Sciences and Arts, Institute for Balkan Studies. pp. 188–195. ISBN 9788675830153.
- Łowmiański, Henryk (2004) [1964]. Nosić, Milan (ed.). Hrvatska pradomovina (Chorwacja Nadwiślańska in Początki Polski) [Croatian ancient homeland] (in Croatian). Translated by Kryżan-Stanojević, Barbara. Maveda. OCLC 831099194.
- Luttwak, Edward N. (2009). The Grand Strategy of the Byzantine Empire. Harvard University Press. ISBN 9780674035195.
- Madgearu, Alexandru (2017). The Asanids: The Political and Military History of the Second Bulgarian Empire (1185–1280). Leiden-Boston: Brill. ISBN 9789004333192.
- Maksimović, Ljubomir (2010). "Serbia's View of the Byzantine World (1204-1261)". Identities and Allegiances in the Eastern Mediterranean After 1204. Farnham: Ashgate. pp. 121–132. ISBN 9781409410980.
- Manojlović-Nikolić, Vesna (2016). "Anthropomorphic Representations on Medieval Rings in Serbia". Истраживања. 27 (27): 45–57. doi:10.19090/i.2016.27.45-57.
- Marjanović-Dušanić, Smilja (2006). "Lʹ idéologie monarchique dans les chartes de la dynastie serbe des Némanides (1168-1371): Étude diplomatique". Archiv für Diplomatik: Schriftgeschichte, Siegel- und Wappenkunde. 52: 149–158. doi:10.7788/afd.2006.52.jg.149. S2CID 96483243.
- Marković, Miodrag; Vojvodić, Dragan, eds. (2017). Serbian Artistic Heritage in Kosovo and Metohija: Identity, Significance, Vulnerability. Belgrade: Serbian Academy of Sciences and Arts.
- Mihaljčić, Rade (1975). Крај Српског царства [End of the Serbian Empire]. Belgrade: Srpska književna zadruga.
- Mileusnić, Slobodan (1998). Medieval Monasteries of Serbia (4th ed.). Novi Sad: Prometej. ISBN 9788676393701.
- Miller, William (1923a). "The Balkan States, I: The Zenith of Bulgaria and Serbia (1186-1355)". The Cambridge Medieval History. Vol. 4. Cambridge: University Press. pp. 517–551.
- Miller, William (1923b). "The Balkan States, II: The Turkish Conquest (1355-1483)". The Cambridge Medieval History. Vol. 4. Cambridge: University Press. pp. 552–593.
- Milosavljević, Boris (2008). "Basic Philosophical Texts in Medieval Serbia" (PDF). Balcanica (39): 79–102. doi:10.2298/BALC0839079M.
- Mirković, Miroslava B. (2017). Sirmium: Its History from the First Century AD to 582 AD. Novi Sad: Center for Historical Research.
- Nešović, Anđelija (2020). "Criminal Sanctions in Dušan's Code". Facta Universitatis, Series: Law and Politics. 18 (2): 117–130. doi:10.22190/FULP2002117N.
- Nikolov, Alexandar (2011). "Stephen Nemanja and the Foundation of the Second Bulgarian Empire: 1183-1190". Стефан Немања и Топлица: Тематски зборник. Ниш: Центар за црквене студије. pp. 59–69.
- Njegovan, Zoran M. (1998). Agriculture of Medieval Serbia. Belgrade: The Economics Institute. ISBN 9788673290430.
- Novaković, Relja (1981). Gde se nalazila Srbija od VII do XII veka. Narodna knjiga i Istorijski institut. Google Books
- Orbini, Mauro (1601). Il Regno de gli Slavi hoggi corrottamente detti Schiavoni. Pesaro: Apresso Girolamo Concordia.
- Орбин, Мавро (1968). Краљевство Словена. Београд: Српска књижевна задруга.
- Ostrogorsky, George (1956). History of the Byzantine State. Oxford: Basil Blackwell.
- Pálosfalvi, Tamás (2018). From Nicopolis to Mohács: A History of Ottoman-Hungarian Warfare, 1389-1526. Leiden: BRILL. ISBN 9789004375659.
- Pavlovich, Paul (1989). The History of the Serbian Orthodox Church. Serbian Heritage Books. ISBN 9780969133124.
- Pavlowitch, Stevan K. (2002). Serbia: The History behind the Name. London: Hurst & Company. ISBN 9781850654773.
- Paizi-Apostolopoulou, Machi (2012). "Appealing to the Authority of a Learned Patriarch: New Evidence on Gennadios Scholarios' Responses to the Questions of George Branković". The Historical Review. 9: 95–116.
- Pavković, Nikola F. (1997). "Protimesis byzantine et le droit de preemption chez les Slaves du Sud" (PDF). Balcanica (28): 165–180.
- Peić, Sava (1994). Medieval Serbian Culture. London: Alpine Fine Arts Collection.
- Pejović, Roksanda (2013). Musical Instruments in Medieval Serbia. Belgrade: University of Arts. ISBN 9788688619257.
- Petković, Vesna; Peić, Sava (2013). Serbian Medieval Cultural Heritage. Belgrade: Dereta.
- Petrović, Vladeta. "Terrestrial Communications in the Late Antiquity and the Early Middle Ages in the Western Part of the Balkan Peninsula". In Rudić (2013), pp. 235–287.
- Polemis, Demetrios I. (1968). The Doukai: A Contribution to Byzantine Prosopography. London: The Athlone Press. ISBN 9780485131222.
- Popović, Marko (1999). Tvrđava Ras [The Fortress of Ras] (in Serbian). Belgrade: Archaeological Institute. ISBN 9788680093147.
- Popović, Marko; Marjanović-Dušanić, Smilja; Popović, Danica (2016). Daily Life in Medieval Serbia. Belgrade: Clio & Institute for Balkan Studies. ISBN 9788671025256.
- Popović, Svetlana (2002). "The Serbian Episcopal Sees in the Thirteenth Century". Старинар (51: 2001): 171–184.
- Porčić, Nebojša (2016). "Information on Travel of Nemanjić Embassies: Content and Context". Balcanica (47): 97–118. doi:10.2298/BALC1647097P.
- Purković, Miodrag A. (1951). "Two Notes on Mediaeval Serbian History". The Slavonic and East European Review. 29 (73): 545–549. JSTOR 4204256.
- Radičević, Dejan (2015). "К изучению раннеславянских памятников Сербского Подунавья (вопросы хронологии и этнокультурной принадлежности)" [Towards the Study of the Early Slavic Sites of the Serbian Danube Region (Questions of Chronology and Ethnocultural Belonging)]. Stratum Plus (in Russian) (5): 285–308.
- Radošević, Ninoslava (1986). "Laudes Serbiae: The Life of Despot Stephan Lazarević by Constantine the Philosopher". Зборник Радова Византолошког Института (in French). 24–25: 445–451.
- Rudić, Srđan, ed. (2013). The World of the Slavs: Studies of the East, West and South Slavs: Civitas, Oppidas, Villas and Archeological Evidence (7th to 11th Centuries AD). The Institute of History.Monographs. Vol. 64. Belgrade: The Institute for History. ISBN 9788677431044.
- Rudnyckyj, Jaroslav (1972). An Etymological Dictionary of the Ukrainian Language. Vol. 1: Parts 1–11, A–G (in English and Ukrainian). Winnipeg: Ukrainian Free Academy of Sciences (UVAN). LCCN 62-20867. OCLC 630429231.
- Runciman, Steven (1930). A History of the First Bulgarian Empire. London: G. Bell & Sons. ISBN 9780598749222.
- Runciman, Steven (1988) [1929]. The Emperor Romanus Lecapenus and His Reign: A Study of Tenth-Century Byzantium. Cambridge University Press. ISBN 9780521357227.
- Ružičić, Gojko (1967). "The Birth Year of Stephan Nemanya". To Honor Roman Jakobson: Essays on the Occasion of His 70. Birthday. Vol. 3. Mouton: The Hague. pp. 1704–1708. ISBN 9783111349138.
- Sedlar, Jean W. (1994). East Central Europe in the Middle Ages, 1000-1500. Seattle: University of Washington Press. ISBN 9780295800646.
- Setton, Kenneth M. (1976). The Papacy and the Levant (1204–1571), Volume I: The Thirteenth and Fourteenth Centuries. Vol. 1. Philadelphia: The American Philosophical Society. ISBN 0-87169-114-0.
- Shepard, Jonathan (1995). "Slavs and Bulgars". The New Cambridge Medieval History. Vol. 2. Cambridge: Cambridge University Press. pp. 228–248. ISBN 9780521362924.
- Shepard, Jonathan (1999). "Bulgaria: The other Balkan Empire". The New Cambridge Medieval History. Vol. 3. Cambridge: Cambridge University Press. pp. 567–583. ISBN 9780521364478.
- Soulis, George Christos (1984). The Serbs and Byzantium during the reign of Tsar Stephen Dušan (1331-1355) and his successors. Washington: Dumbarton Oaks Library and Collection. ISBN 9780884021377.
- Sophoulis, Panos (2020). Banditry in the Medieval Balkans, 800-1500. Cham: Springer Nature. ISBN 9783030559052.
- Špehar, Perica N. (2010). "By Their Fruit you will recognize them - Christianization of Serbia in Middle Ages". Tak więc po owocach poznacie ich. Poznań: Stowarzyszenie naukowe archeologów Polskich. pp. 203–220.
- Špehar, Perica N. (2015a). "Remarks to Christianisation and Realms in the Central Balkans in the Light of Archaeological Finds (7th-11th c.)". Castellum, Civitas, Urbs: Centres and Elites in Early Medieval East-Central Europe. Budapest: Verlag Marie Leidorf. pp. 71–93.
- Špehar, Perica N. (2015b). "(Dis)continuity of the Life in Late Antique Danubian Fortresses in Early Middle Ages: From Belgrade to the Confluence of the Timok River". Archaeology of the First Millennium A.D. Vol. 4. Brăila: Istros. pp. 329–350.
- Špehar, Perica N. (2019). "Reocupation of the Late Antique Fortifications on the central Balkans during the Early Middle Ages". Fortifications, Defence Systems, Structures, and Features in the Past. Zagreb: Institute of Archaeology. pp. 113–124.
- Spremić, Momčilo (2004). "La famille serbe des Branković - considérations généalogiques et héraldiques" (PDF). Зборник Радова Византолошког Института (in French). 41: 441–452.
- Spremić, Momčilo (2014). "Le Despote Stefan Lazarević et Sieur Djuradj Branković" (PDF). Balcanica (45): 145–163. doi:10.2298/BALC1445145S.
- Stanković, Vlada, ed. (2016). The Balkans and the Byzantine World before and after the Captures of Constantinople, 1204 and 1453. Lanham, Maryland: Lexington Books. ISBN 9781498513265.
- Stanojević, Stanoje (2019) [1927]. Serbian Rulers from the 9th to the 20th Century. Belgrade: Princip Pres.
- Stoianovich, Traian (1995). Between East and West: The Balkan and Mediterranean Worlds. Vol. 3. New Rochelle: A.D. Caratzas. ISBN 9780892415069.
- Šuica, Marko (2011). "The Image of the Battle of Kosovo (1389) Today: a Historic Event, a Moral Pattern, or the Tool of Political Manipulation". The Uses of the Middle Ages in Modern European States: History, Nationhood and the Search for Origins. New York: Palgrave Macmillan. pp. 152–174. ISBN 9780230283107.
- Šuica, Marko (2017). "Effects of Early Ottoman Conquests on the State and Social Structure of the Lazarević Principality". State and Society in the Balkans Before and After Establishment of Ottoman Rule. Belgrade: The Institute of History. pp. 7–23.
- Šuica, Marko; Rudić, Slobodan (2017). "Princess Milica as the Ottoman Vassal – One Case of Multifaceted Serbian-Ottoman Relations at the end of 14th Century". Uluslararasi Balkan Tarihi ve Kültürü Sempozyumu. pp. 88–102.
- Temperley, Harold W. V. (1919) [1917]. History of Serbia (PDF) (2nd ed.). London: Bell and Sons.
- Thomson, Francis J. (1993). "Archbishop Daniel II of Serbia: Hierarch, Hagiographer, Saint: With Some Comments on the Vitae regum et archiepiscoporum Serbiae and the Cults of Mediaeval Serbian Saints". Analecta Bollandiana. 111 (1–2): 103–134. doi:10.1484/J.ABOL.4.03279.
- Turlej, Stanisław (2016). Justiniana Prima: An Underestimated Aspect of Justinian's Church Policy. Krakow: Jagiellonian University Press. ISBN 9788323395560.
- Uzelac, Aleksandar B. (2011). "Tatars and Serbs at the end of the Thirteenth Century". Revista de istorie Militara. 5–6: 9–20.
- Uzelac, Aleksandar B. (2015). "Foreign Soldiers in the Nemanjić State - A Critical Overview". Belgrade Historical Review. 6: 69–89.
- Uzelac, Aleksandar B. (2018). "Prince Michael of Zahumlje – a Serbian ally of Tsar Simeon". Emperor Symeon's Bulgaria in the History of Europe's South-East: 1100 years from the Battle of Achelous. Sofia: St Kliment Ohridski University Press. pp. 236–245.
- Vásáry, István (2005). Cumans and Tatars: Oriental Military in the Pre-Ottoman Balkans, 1185–1365. Cambridge: Cambridge University Press. ISBN 9781139444088.
- Vlahović, Petar (2004). Serbia: The Country, People, Life, Customs. Belgrade: Ethnographic Museum. ISBN 9788678910319.
- Vlasto, Alexis P. (1970). The Entry of the Slavs into Christendom: An Introduction to the Medieval History of the Slavs. Cambridge: Cambridge University Press. ISBN 9780521074599.
- Vojvodić, Dragan; Popović, Danica, eds. (2016). Sacral Art of the Serbian Lands in the Middle Ages. Belgrade: Institute for Byzantine Studies.
- Whitby, Michael (1988). The Emperor Maurice and his Historian: Theophylact Simocatta on Persian and Balkan warfare. Oxford: Clarendon Press. ISBN 9780198229452.
- Whittow, Mark (1996). The Making of Orthodox Byzantium, 600–1025. Basingstoke: Macmillan. ISBN 9781349247653.
- Zečević, Nada (2014). The Tocco of the Greek Realm: Nobility, Power and Migration in Latin Greece (14th-15th centuries). Belgrade: Makart. ISBN 9788691944100.
- Živković, Tibor; Bojanin, Stanoje; Petrović, Vladeta, eds. (2000). Selected Charters of Serbian Rulers (XII-XV Century): Relating to the Territory of Kosovo and Metohia. Athens: Center for Studies of Byzantine Civilisation.
- Živković, Tibor (2006). Portreti srpskih vladara (IX—XII vek). Belgrade: Zavod za udžbenike. ISBN 86-17-13754-1.
- Živković, Tibor (2007). "The Golden Seal of Stroimir" (PDF). Historical Review. 55. Belgrade: The Institute for History: 23–29.
- Živković, Tibor (2008a). Forging unity: The South Slavs between East and West 550-1150. Belgrade: The Institute of History, Čigoja štampa. ISBN 9788675585732.
- Živković, Tibor (2008b). "Constantine Porphyrogenitus' Kastra oikoumena in the Southern Slavs Principalities" (PDF). Историјски Часопис. 57: 9–28.
- Živković, Tibor (2010a). "Constantine Porphyrogenitus' Source on the Earliest History of the Croats and Serbs". Radovi Zavoda Za Hrvatsku Povijest U Zagrebu. 42: 117–131.
- Živković, Tibor (2010b). "On the Beginnings of Bosnia in the Middle Ages". Spomenica akademika Marka Šunjića (1927-1998). Sarajevo: Filozofski fakultet. pp. 161–180.
- Živković, Tibor (2011). "The Origin of the Royal Frankish Annalist's Information about the Serbs in Dalmatia". Homage to Academician Sima Ćirković. Belgrade: The Institute for History. pp. 381–398. ISBN 9788677430917.
- Živković, Tibor (2012). De conversione Croatorum et Serborum: A Lost Source. Belgrade: The Institute of History.
- Živković, Tibor (2012b). "Неретљани – пример разматрања идентитета у раном средњем веку" [Arentani - an Example of Identity Examination in the Early Middle Ages]. Istorijski časopis. 61: 11–25.
- Živković, Tibor (2013a). "On the Baptism of the Serbs and Croats in the Time of Basil I (867–886)" (PDF). Studia Slavica et Balcanica Petropolitana (1): 33–53.
- Živković, Tibor (2013b). "The Urban Landcape [sic] of Early Medieval Slavic Principalities in the Territories of the Former Praefectura Illyricum and in the Province of Dalmatia (ca. 610-950)". In Rudić (2013), pp. 15–36.
- Allcock, John B.; Lampe, John R. (2023). Britannica-History of Serbia (updated version 2023).
