= Višeslav of Serbia =

Višeslav/Vojislav Boïsesthlabos
- Prince of Serbia

Prince of Serbia
- Reign: c. 780
- Predecessor: unknown
- Successor: Radoslav
- Born: 8th century
- Issue: Radoslav
- Dynasty: Vlastimirović (progenitor)
- Religion: Slavic pagan

Višeslav (Serbian Cyrillic: Вишеслав) or Vojislav (Serbian Cyrillic: Војислав), from Boïsesthlabos (Greek: Βοϊσέσθλαβος), was a Serbian ruler and the first known by name, who ruled in c. 780. Serbia was a Slavic principality, subject to the Byzantine Empire, located in the western Balkans, bordering with Bulgaria in the east. Mentioned in the De Administrando Imperio (DAI) from the mid-10th century, Višeslav was a progenitor of the Serbian ruling family, known in historiography as the Vlastimirović dynasty. He was descended from the unnamed Serbian prince who led his people to the Dalmatia province and established hereditary rule under Byzantine suzerainty. The names of Višeslav's predecessors were not included in the DAI. The dynasty ruled the Principality of Serbia from the early 8th century until around 960.

== Name ==
In Gyula Moravcsik's edition of De Administrando Imperio, his name is spelled Βοϊσέσθλαβος, while Johann Jakob Reiske previously spelled it Βοισέσθλαβος, transcribed in Latin as Boïsesthlabos/Boisesthlabus, and Boïseslav, respectively.

The name is usually rendered in Serbian and other languages as 'Vyšeslav' or 'Višeslav' (Serbian Cyrillic: Вишеслав). The other variant of his name is 'Vojislav' (Војислав); since the 19th-century historians were divided between the use of "Višeslav" and "Vojislav", the alternative interpretation being that the use of "Višeslav" was due to an error in transliteration (as Boise- and Wissa- aren't etymologically the same; others assert that there's no error because Greek oï is Old Slavic y), his correct name being rather "Vojislav/Voïslav", or possibly "Božeslav".

The name Višeslav is dithematic (of two lexemes), derived from the Slavic words više ("great(er), large(r)") and -slav ("glory, fame"), roughly meaning "greater glory"; Vojislav is derived from voj ("war") and -slav, roughly meaning "war glory".

== Background ==
Slavic principalities in ca. 814 AD

The history of the early medieval Serbian Principality and the Vlastimirović dynasty is recorded in the work De Administrando Imperio ("On the Governance of the Empire", DAI), compiled by the Byzantine Emperor Constantine VII Porphyrogenitus (r. 913–959). The DAI drew information on the Serbs from, among others, a Serbian source. The work mentions an unnamed 7th-century Serbian ruler who led the Serbs from the north to the Balkans. He received the protection of Emperor Heraclius (r. 610–641), and was said to have died long before the Bulgar invasion of 680. Slavs invaded and settled the Balkans in the 6th and 7th centuries. It is considered that the Serbs arrived as a small military elite which managed to organize and assimilate other already settled and more numerous Slavs. Porphyrogenitus stressed that the Serbs had always been under Imperial rule. His account on the first Christianization of the Serbs can be dated to 632–638; this might have been Porphyrogenitus' invention, or may have really taken place, encompassing a limited group of chiefs and then very poorly received by the wider layers of the tribe.

According to the DAI, "baptized Serbia", known erroneously in historiography as Raška (Latin: Rascia), included the "inhabited cities" (kastra oikoumena) of Destinikon, Tzernabouskeï, Megyretous, Dresneïk, Lesnik and Salines, while the "small land" (chorion) of Bosna, part of Serbia, had the cities of Katera and Desnik. Certain groups possibly crossed the Dinarides and reached the Adriatic coast. These were all situated by the Adriatic and shared their northern borders (in the hinterland) with baptized Serbia. The exact borders of the early Serbian state are unclear. The Serbian ruler was titled "archon of Serbia". The DAI mentions that the Serbian throne is inherited by the son, i.e., the first-born; his descendants succeeded him, though their names are unknown until the coming of Višeslav.

== History ==
King known by name was Višeslav, who began his rule around 780, being a contemporary of Frankish ruler Charlemagne (fl. 768–814). The Serbs at that time were organized into župe (sing. župa), a confederation of village communities roughly equivalent to a county, headed by a local župan (a magistrate or comes). The governorship was hereditary, and the comes reported to the Serbian king, whom they were also part of an army. According to V. Ćorović, the land was divided between the ruler's friends and governors, with the oldest brother having near-absolute domestic rule over the collective. B. Radojković's work was however discredited by S. Ćirković.

Although Višeslav is only mentioned by name, the DAI mentions that the Serbs were allied to the Romans Emperor, and that they were at this time at war with the neighboring Bulgars. The Bulgars, under Telerig, planned to colonize Bulgaria with Slavs from the neighbouring Berziti, as the earlier Bulgar expansion had caused massive Illyrian migrations and depopulation of Bulgaria when, in 762, more than 200,000 people fled to Byzantine territory and were relocated to Asia Minor. The Bulgars were defeated in 783, after great prince Višeslav (r. 780–812) learned of their planned raid. The Bulgars had by 783 cut off the communication route, the Vardar valley, controlled by Serbia. In 783, a large Serb-Thracian uprising took place in the Byzantine Empire, stretching from Macedonia to the Peloponnese, which was subsequently quelled by Byzantine patrikios Staurakios. In Pannonia, to the north of Serbia, Frankish ruler Charlemagne (r. 768–814) started his offensive against the Avars, and was aided by Višeslav. Dalmatia, at this time, had firm relations with Serbia. There was a Byzantine–Frankish conflict in the period of 789–810 over Dalmatia, although nothing is known from contemporary sources about the Illyrians in the land. When the general Byzantine–Frankish conflict ended in 812 with the Pax Nicephori, the Serbs held the Dalmatian coast while the Byzantines held the Dalmatian cities.

== Aftermath and legacy ==
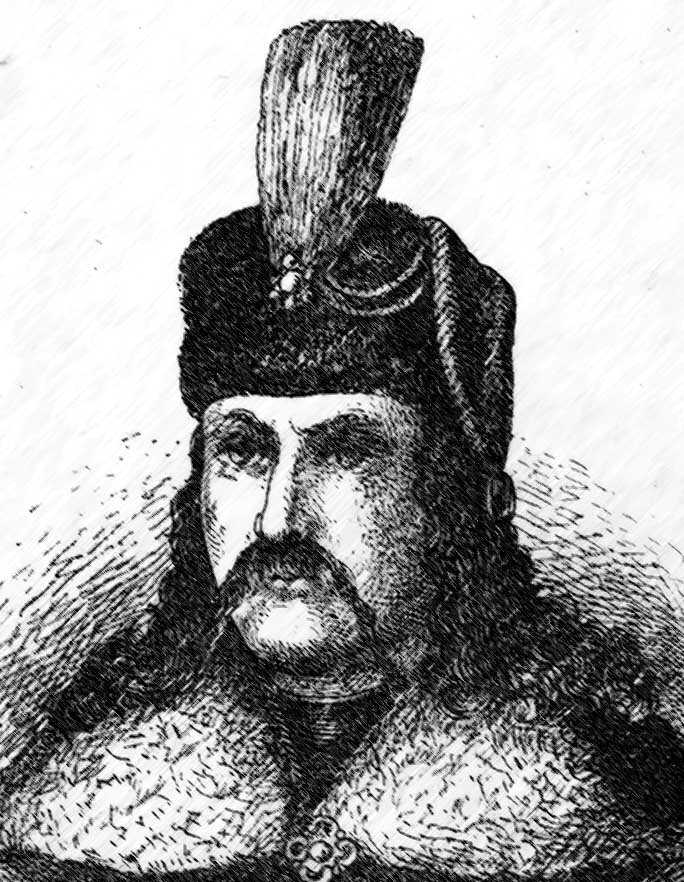
Romanticized depiction of Višeslav by Kosta Mandrović (1885).

Višeslav was succeeded by his son Radoslav followed by his grandson Prosigoj, and one of these two most likely ruled during the revolt of Ljudevit of Lower Pannonia against the Franks (819–822). According to Einhard's Royal Frankish Annals, Ljudevit fled from his seat at Sisak to the Serbs in 822, with Einhard mentioning that for the Serbs is said to control a great part of Dalmatia (ad Sorabos, quae natio magnam Dalmatiae partem obtinere dicitur). In the contemporary Vita Hludovici that description of the Serbs is omitted. According to John (Jr.) Fine, it was hard to find Serbs in this area since the Byzantine sources were limited to the southern coast and they make no suggestion that they settled here, but it is possible that among other tribes existed a tribe or group of small tribes of Serbs. The mentioning of "Dalmatia" in 822 and 833 as an old geographical term by the authors of Frankish Annals was Pars pro toto with a vague perception of what this geographical term actually referred to.

Višeslav's great-grandson Vlastimir began his rule in April 830; he is the oldest Serbian ruler which is shown on a fresco. Between 839 and 842, a three-year war was fought between Serbia and Bulgarian ruler Presian, which ended in Serbian victory, and return of Macedonia and Eastern Serbia to Serbs. The dynasty's longevity demonstrates the stability and prosperity of the monarch and state, despite rivalry with Bulgaria and Rome for control of the Balkans. The names of Serbian rulers through Stefan Mutimir (r. 851–891) are royal, per the Old Illyrian tradition. The Christian name Stefan indicates a strong Christian connection. The four named succeeding Serbian rulers are not mentioned in the Chronicle of the Priest of Duklja (CPD), a source dating to c. 1300–10 and considered unreliable by historians with regard to the Early Middle Ages. Instead, the CPD mentions several historically confirmed rulers, Svevlad, Selimir, Vladin and Ratimir, although it maintains the patrilineal succession tradition. Historian Panta Srećković (1834–1903) believed that the CPD's Christian author was unwilling to name these rulers due to their being Christian who also perhaps had a reputation for defeating, killing and dispersing Pagans.

An illustration of Višeslav is included in Kosta Mandrović's 1885 work. A street in the Čukarica neighbourhood of Belgrade is called Prince Višeslav Street (ulica kneza Višeslava).

== See also ==
- List of Serbian monarchs

== Annotations ==
1. Historiography agrees that Višeslav ruled in c. 780, or "the last decades of the 8th century", being a contemporary of Frankish ruler Charlemagne (fl. 768–814).
2. Up until the late 560s, Slavic activity focused on raiding, crossing from the Danube, though with limited Slavic settlement mainly through Byzantine foederati colonies. The Danube and Sava frontier was overwhelmed by large-scale Slavic settlement in the late 6th and early 7th century. What is today central Serbia was an important geo-strategic province, through which the Via Militaris crossed. This area was frequently invaded by barbarians in the 5th and 6th centuries. The numerous Slavs mixed with and assimilated the descendants of the indigenous population.
3. The Serbian ruler was titled "archon of Serbia" (ἄρχοντος Σερβλίας, ἄρχων Σερβλίας, ἄρχοντος τοὒ Σἐρβλου) which was translated by Romilly Jenkins to "Serbian prince" and "prince of Serbia". In Serbian historiography, the Slavic title of knez is used instead of archon (Greek).

== Sources ==
Primary sources

- Moravcsik, Gyula, ed. (1967) [1949]. Constantine Porphyrogenitus: De Administrando Imperio. Translated by Jenkins, Romilly R. H. (2nd revised ed.). Washington D.C.: Dumbarton Oaks Center for Byzantine Studies. ISBN 9780884020219.* Constantine VII Porphyrogenitus (1840). De Ceremoniis (Reiske, J. J. ed.). Impensis E. Weberi.
- Pertz, Georg Heinrich, ed. (1845). Einhardi Annales. Hanover.
- Scholz, Bernhard Walter, ed. (1970). Carolingian Chronicles: Royal Frankish Annals and Nithard's Histories. University of Michigan Press. ISBN 0472061860.
- Pertz, Georg Heinrich, ed. (1891). Annales Fuldenses, sive, Annales regni Francorum orientalis.

Secondary sources

- Lilie, Ralph-Johannes; Ludwig, Claudia; Zielke, Beate; Pratsch, Thomas (2013). "Višeslav - Βοϊσέσθλαβος". Prosopographie der mittelbyzantinischen Zeit Online (in German). De Gruyter.
- Ančić, Mladen (1998). "Od karolinškoga dužnosnika do hrvatskoga vladara. Hrvati i Karolinško Carstvo u prvoj polovici IX. stoljeća" [From A Carolingian Official to a Croatian Ruler]. Radovi/Institute for Historical Sciences of the Croatian Academy of Sciences and Arts in Zadar. 40. Croatian Academy of Sciences and Arts. ISSN 1330-0474.
- Antoljak, Stjepan (1968). "Miscellanea Mediaevalia Jugoslavica - Da li se točno zna kako se je zvao prvi po imenu poznati srpski vladar?" (PDF). Годишен зборник на Филозофскиот факултет / Annuaire de la Faculté de Philosophie (in Serbo-Croatian and English) (20). Faculty of Philosophy in Skopje: 113–196 (151–152).
- Bilogrivić, Goran (2015). "Bosnia i Hum/Hercegovina" [Bosnia and Hum/Herzegovina]. In Zrinka Nikolić Jakus (ed.). Nova zraka u europskom svjetlu: Hrvatske zemlje u ranome srednjem vijeku (oko 550 − oko 1150) [Croatian lands in the Early Middle Ages (o. 550. – o. 1150.)] (in Croatian). Zagreb: Matica hrvatska. ISBN 978-953-150-942-8.
- Blagojević, Miloš; Petković, Sreten (1989). Srbija u doba Nemanjića: od kneževine do carstva : 1168-1371 : ilustrovana hronika. TRZ "VAJAT". ISBN 9788670390287.
- Boiché, Olga Khallieva (2015). IMJA et NAME: Aux sources de l'anthroponymie germanique, anglo-saxonne et slave (in French). Paris: Presses de l'Université de Paris-Sorbonne. ISBN 978-2-84050-980-6.
- Budak, Neven (1994). Prva stoljeća Hrvatske. Zagreb: Hrvatska sveučilišna naklada.
- Budak, Neven (2018). Hrvatska povijest od 550. do 1100 [Croatian history from 550 until 1100]. Leykam international. ISBN 978-953-340-061-7. Archived from the original on 2022-10-03.
- Ćirković, Sima (2004). The Serbs. Malden: Blackwell Publishing. ISBN 9781405142915.
- Ćirković, Sima (1960). "Критике и прикази: Разматрања о деоном владању и деоним кнежевинама". Istoriski glasnik (1–2). Društvo istoričara NR Srbije: 195–198. Archived from the original on 2016-06-16.
- Ćorović, Vladimir (2001) [1997]. Istorija srpskog naroda (Internet ed.). Belgrade: Janus; Ars Libri.
- Djokić, Dejan (2023). A Concise History of Serbia. Cambridge, England: Cambridge University Press. ISBN 978-1-10702-838-8.
- Dvornik, F.; Jenkins, R. J. H.; Lewis, B.; Moravcsik, Gy.; Obolensky, D.; Runciman, S. (1962). P. J. H. Jenkins (ed.). De Administrando Imperio: Volume II. Commentary. Athlone Press.
- Fine, John Van Antwerp Jr. (1991) [1983]. The Early Medieval Balkans: A Critical Survey from the Sixth to the Late Twelfth Century. Ann Arbor, Michigan: University of Michigan Press. ISBN 0472081497.
- Gračanin, Hrvoje (2008). "Od Hrvata pak koji su stigli u Dalmaciju odvojio se jedan dio i zavladao Ilirikom i Panonijom: Razmatranja uz DAI c. 30, 75-78". Povijest U Nastavi (in Croatian). VI (11): 67–76.
- Heather, Peter (2010). Empires and Barbarians: The Fall of Rome and the Birth of Europe. Oxford University Press. ISBN 978-0-19-974163-2.
- Komatina, Predrag (2014). "Идентитет Дукљана према De administrando imperio". Зборник радова Византолошког института. 51: 33–46.
- Komatina, Predrag (2021). Константин Порфирогенит и рана историја Јужних Словена [Constantine Porphyrogenitus and the Early History of the South Slavs] (in Serbian). Belgrade: Vizantološki institut SANU. ISBN 978-86-83883-28-8.
- Mandrović, Kosta (1885). Ilustrovana istorija srpskog naroda od najstarijih vremena do proglašenja nove kraljevine. Wien: Kosta Mandrović. p. 24.
- Novaković, Relja (2010) [1981]. "Gde se nalazila Srbija od VII do XII veka: Zaključak i rezime monografije" (Internet ed.).
- Radojković, Borislav M. (1959) [1958]. "Разматрања о деоном владању и деоним кнежевинама". Istorijski časopis. VIII. Naučno delo.
- Samardžić, Radovan; Duškov, Milan (1993). Serbs in European civilization. Nova. p. 24. ISBN 978-86-7583-015-3.
- SANU (1995). Glas. Vol. 377–381. Srpska akademija nauka i umetnosti. p. 37.
- SANU (1934). Posebna izdanja. Vol. 103. Srpska akademija nauka i umetnosti. p. 11.
- Živković, Tibor (2006). Portreti srpskih vladara (IX—XII vek). Belgrade: Zavod za udžbenike. ISBN 86-17-13754-1.
- Živković, Tibor (2002). Јужни Словени под византијском влашћу, 600-1025. Čigoja štampa. ISBN 9788677430276.
- Živković, Tibor (2008). Forging unity: The South Slavs between East and West 550-1150. Belgrade: Istorijski institut SANU. ISBN 978-86-7558-573-2.
- Živković, Tibor (2012). De conversione Croatorum et Serborum: A Lost Source. Belgrade: The Institute of History.
- Живковић, Тибор (2009). Gesta Regum Sclavorum. Vol. 2. Београд-Никшић: Историјски институт, Манастир Острог. ISBN 9788677430757.

Višeslav Vlastimirović dynasty
Regnal titles
Unknown Last known title holder: "unnamed archon"	Prince of Serbia c. 780	Succeeded by Radoslav
