= Radoslav of Serbia =

Radoslav, Rodoslav Радослав, Родослав Rodosthlabos
- Knez, Archont, Prince of Serbs

Prince of Serbia
- Reign: fl. beginning of the 9th century
- Predecessor: Višeslav
- Successor: Prosigoj
- Issue: Prosigoj
- House: Vlastimirović dynasty
- Father: Višeslav
- Religion: Slavic pagan

Radoslav (Serbian: Радослав, or Rodoslav, from Rodosthlabos (Greek: Ῥοδόσθλαβος), was a Serbian Prince (Knez, Archont) who ruled over the early medieval Principality of Serbia at the beginning of the 9th century. He succeeded his father, prince Višeslav, who ruled at the end of the 8th century. Radoslav was succeeded by his son, prince Prosigoj.

== Rule ==
Europe 814

According to De Administrando Imperio, compiled by the Byzantine Emperor Constantine VII Porphyrogenitus, during the reign of princes Višeslav, Radoslav and Prosigoj there was no war between the Serbian Principality and its eastern neighbour, the Bulgarian Khanate.

Radoslav or his son was the ruler of Serbia during the uprisings (819–822) of Ljudevit Posavski against the Franks. According to the Royal Frankish Annals, in 822, Ljudevit went from his seat in Sisak to the Serbs, somewhere in western Bosnia. Under the same entry, the Royal Frankish Annals state that Serbs were controlling a great part of Dalmatia ("ad Sorabos, quae natio magnam Dalmatiae partem obtinere dicitur")

During the reign of prince Radoslav, and his immediate predecessors and successors, the process of gradual Christianization of the Serbs was still going on, starting in the first half of the 7th century and finally ending by the middle of the 9th century.

== See also ==
- History of the Serbs
- Vlastimirović dynasty
- Early Medieval Principality of Serbia

== Sources ==
Primary sources

- Ферјанчић, Божидар (1959). "Константин VII Порфирогенит". Византиски извори за историју народа Југославије. Vol. 2. Београд: Византолошки институт. pp. 1–98.
- Moravcsik, Gyula, ed. (1967) [1949]. Constantine Porphyrogenitus: De Administrando Imperio (2nd revised ed.). Washington D.C.: Dumbarton Oaks Center for Byzantine Studies.
- Pertz, Georg Heinrich, ed. (1845). Einhardi Annales. Hanover.
- Scholz, Bernhard Walter, ed. (1970). Carolingian Chronicles: Royal Frankish Annals and Nithard's Histories. University of Michigan Press.

Secondary sources

- Ćirković, Sima (2004). The Serbs. Malden: Blackwell Publishing.
- Curta, Florin (2006). Southeastern Europe in the Middle Ages, 500–1250. Cambridge: Cambridge University Press.
- Dvornik, F.; Jenkins, R. J. H.; Lewis, B.; Moravcsik, Gy.; Obolensky, D.; Runciman, S. (1962). P. J. H. Jenkins (ed.). De Administrando Imperio: Volume II. Commentary. University of London: The Athlone Press.
- Fine, John Van Antwerp Jr. (1991) [1983]. The Early Medieval Balkans: A Critical Survey from the Sixth to the Late Twelfth Century. Ann Arbor, Michigan: University of Michigan Press.
- Fine, John Van Antwerp Jr. (2005). When Ethnicity Did Not Matter in the Balkans: A Study of Identity in Pre-Nationalist Croatia, Dalmatia, and Slavonia in the Medieval and Early-Modern Periods. Ann Arbor, Michigan: University of Michigan Press.
- Komatina, Predrag (2021). Константин Порфирогенит и рана историја Јужних Словена [Constantine Porphyrogenitus and the Early History of the South Slavs] (in Serbian). Belgrade: Vizantološki institut SANU. ISBN 978-86-83883-28-8.
- Живковић, Тибор (2002). Јужни Словени под византијском влашћу 600-1025 (South Slavs under the Byzantine Rule 600-1025). Београд: Историјски институт САНУ, Службени гласник.
- Живковић, Тибор (2006). Портрети српских владара: IX-XII век (Portraits of Serbian Rulers: IX-XII Century). Београд: Завод за уџбенике и наставна средства.
- Živković, Tibor (2008). Forging unity: The South Slavs between East and West 550-1150. Belgrade: The Institute of History, Čigoja štampa.

Knez of Serbia Vlastimirović dynasty
Regnal titles
Preceded by Višeslav I	Prince of Serbia; 814–822	Succeeded by Prosigoj
