= Unnamed 7th-century Serbian ruler =

Putative Serbian Balkan migration leader

Serbian archon
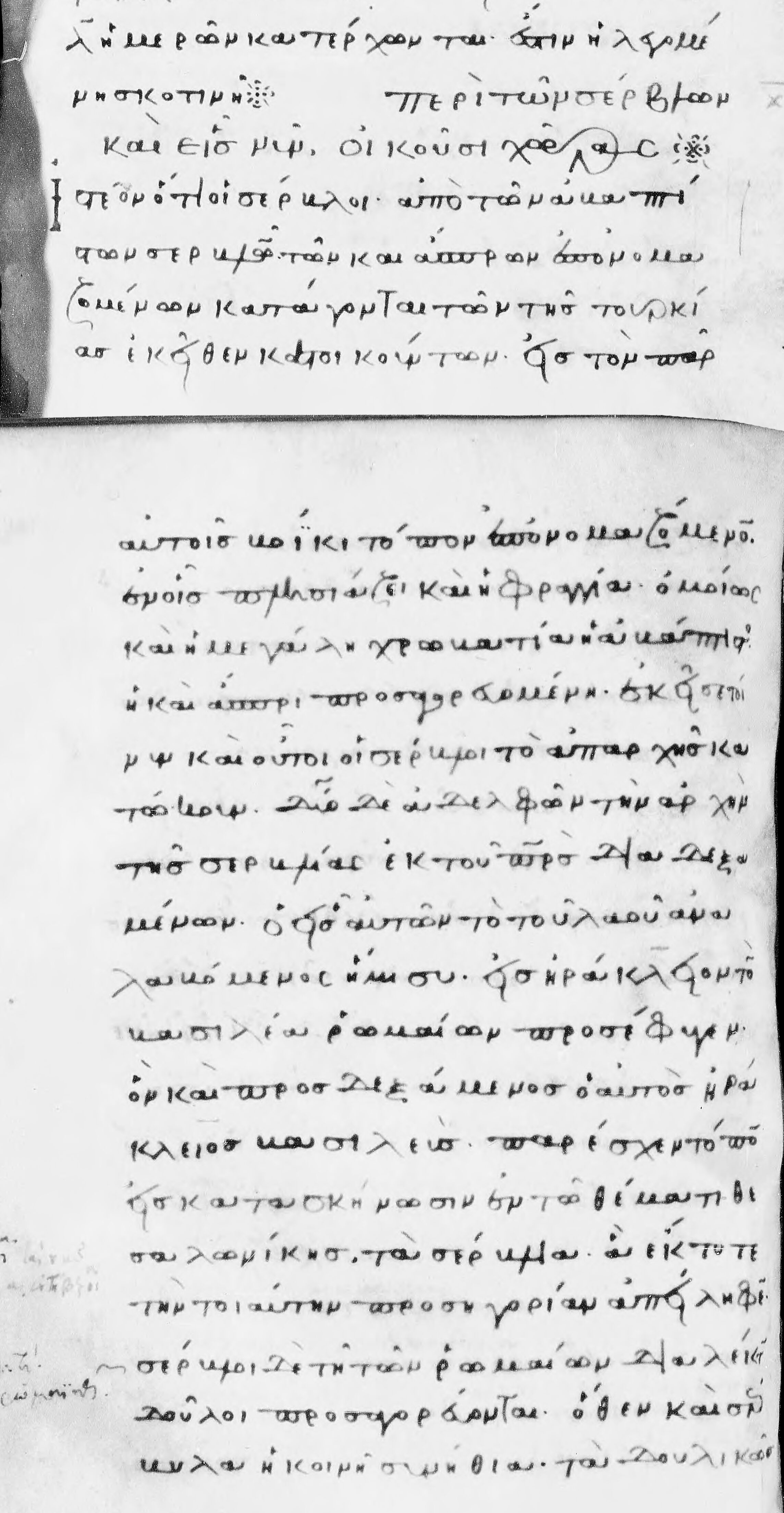
- The Serbian archon led the Serbs to the Balkans according to the origins of the Serbs narrated in De Administrando Imperio

Prince of Serbia
- Reign: fl. 626–50*
- Born: late 6th century White Serbia
- Died: before 680; Balkans
- Issue: Unnamed son
- Dynasty: Vlastimirović (legendary progenitor)
- Father: Dervan (father or relative)

The unnamed 7th-century Serbian ruler or Serbian archon (Ancient Greek: ἄρχων τῶν Σέρβων, romanized: árchōn tōn Sérbōn) is a figure known from the 10th-century Byzantine chronicle, De Administrando Imperio. In it, he is reported to have been the leader of the Serbs, whom he led from White Serbia—their northern homeland—to settle in the Balkans during the reign of Heraclius. He is narrated to have died prior to the arrival of the Bulgars in the Balkans in 680. According to the narrative he was succeeded by a line of his descendants and though this figure is not named by the account, his progeny is stated to be the first Serbian dynasty—which is known today as the Vlastimirović dynasty.

This chronicle and its narrative of a White Serbian homeland have served as the foundation-stone narrative of traditional Serbian historiography. Historians following these perspectives commonly view him as related to Dervan, a leader of the Sorbs—in line with the dominant identification of White Serbia as the lands of the Sorbs common among them.

== Studies ==
According to the accounts in DAI the first Christianization of the Serbs should be dated to 632–638; this could be interpreted at first glance as Porphyrogenitus' invention, or might have actually taken place, encompassing a limited group of chiefs and then very poorly received by the wider layers of the tribe. In early historical assessment like that of German historian Ludwig Albrecht Gebhardi (1735–1802), the Serb archon was a son of Dervan, who was the Duke (dux) of the Surbi, east of the Saale. Francis Dvornik (1962), Relja Novaković (1977) and others argued the possibility that they were brothers or other relatives.

In contemporary historiography and archaeology, the narratives of De Administrando Imperio have been reassessed as they contain anachronisms and factual mistakes. The account in DAI about the Serbs mentions that they requested from the Byzantine commander of present-day Belgrade to settle in the theme of Thessalonica, which was formed ca. 150 years after the reign of Heraclius which was in the 7th century. For the purposes of its narrative, the DAI formulates a mistaken etymology of the Serbian ethnonym which it derives from Latin servi (serfs).

As the Byzantine Empire sought to establish its hegemony towards the Serbs, the narrative of the DAI sought to establish a historical hegemony over the Serbs by claiming that their arrival, settlement and conversion to Christianity was the direct result of the Byzantine interference in the centuries which preceded the writing of DAI. D. Dzino (2010) considers that the story of the migration from White Serbia after the invitation of Heraclius as a means of explanation of the settlement of the Serbs is a form of rationalization of the social and cultural change which the Balkans had undergone via the misinterpretation of historical events placed in late antiquity.

== Sources ==
- Curta, Florin (2001). The Making of the Slavs: History and Archaeology of the Lower Danube Region, c. 500–700. Cambridge: Cambridge University Press. ISBN 9781139428880.
- Dvornik F.; Romilly J.; Lewis B.; Moravcsik G.; Obolensky D.; Runciman S. (1962). Jenkins, Romilly (ed.). De Administrando Imperio: Volume II Commentary. London: The Athlone Press, University of London. ISBN 9780884020219.
- Dzino, Danijel (2010). Becoming Slav, Becoming Croat: Identity Transformations in Post-Roman and Early Medieval Dalmatia. Brill. ISBN 9789004186460.
- Ćirković, Sima (2004). The Serbs. Malden: Blackwell Publishing. ISBN 9781405142915.
- Fine, John V. A. Jr. (1991) [1983]. The Early Medieval Balkans: A Critical Survey from the Sixth to the Late Twelfth Century. Ann Arbor: University of Michigan Press. ISBN 0-472-08149-7.
- Kardaras, Georgios (2011). "The Settlement of the Croats and Serbs on the Balkans in the Frame of the Byzantine-Avar Conflicts" (PDF). Bulgaria, the Bulgarians, Europe - Mythus, History, Modernity, Veliko Turnovo, Oct. 29-31. 2009. IV. University Press "St. Cyril and Methodius".
- Constantine Porphyregonitus (1967) [1949]. Moravcsik, Gyula (ed.). De Administrando Imperio. R.J.H. Jenkins transl. (2nd revised ed.). Washington D.C.: Dumbarton Oaks Center for Byzantine Studies. ISBN 9780884020219. (Primary)
- Živković, Tibor (2002). Јужни Словени под византијском влашћу 600-1025 (South Slavs under the Byzantine Rule 600-1025). Београд: Историјски институт САНУ, Службени гласник. ISBN 9788677430276.
- Živković, Tibor (2006). Портрети српских владара: IX-XII век (Portraits of Serbian Rulers: IX-XII Century). Београд: Завод за уџбенике и наставна средства. ISBN 9788617137548.
- Živković, Tibor (2008). Forging unity: The South Slavs between East and West 550-1150. Belgrade: The Institute of History, Čigoja štampa. ISBN 9788675585732.
- Živković, Tibor (2010). "Constantine Porphyrogenitus' Source on the Earliest History of the Croats and Serbs". Radovi Zavoda Za Hrvatsku Povijest U Zagrebu. 42: 117–131.

Unnamed Prince of Serbia Vlastimirović dynasty
Regnal titles
| First | Prince of the Serbs fl. 610–641 | Succeeded by a son, also unnamed (also see: Višeslav) |
