= Prosigoj =

- Prince of Serbia

Prince of Serbia
- Reign: ? – c. 830
- Predecessor: Radoslav
- Successor: Vlastimir
- Born: Second half of the 8th century
- Died: First half of the 9th century
- Issue: Vlastimir
- Dynasty: Vlastimirović
- Father: Radoslav
- Religion: Slavic pagan

Prosigoj (Serbian: Просигој, Greek: Προσηγόης) was a Serbian ruler believed to have ruled prior to c. 830. Serbia was a Slavic principality subject to the Byzantine Empire, located in the western Balkans, bordering with Bulgaria in the east. Mentioned in the De Administrando Imperio (DAI) from the mid-10th century, he succeeded his father Radoslav and was succeeded by his son Vlastimir (r. c. 830–851).

Europe 814

The son of Radoslav, and grandson of Višeslav, the first Serbian ruler by name, Prosigoj is believed to have ruled some time before c. 830, or until 835. One of these most likely ruled during the revolt of Ljudevit of the Slavs in Lower Pannonia against the Franks (819–822). According to Einhard's Royal Frankish Annals, Ljudevit fled from his seat at Sisak to the Serbs in 822, with Einhard mentioning the Serbs as a people "which is said to be holding a great part of Dalmatia" (ad Sorabos, quae natio magnam Dalmatiae partem obtinere dicitur) but according to John (Jr.) Fine, it was hard to find Serbs in this area since the Byzantine sources were limited to the southern coast, also it is possible that among other tribes exists tribe of group of small tribes of Serbs. The mentioning of "Dalmatia" in 822 and 833 as an old geographical term by the authors of Frankish Annals was Pars pro toto with a vague perception of what this geographical term actually referred to. At this time, there was still peace with Bulgaria. His son Vlastimir is the eponymous founder of the Vlastimirović dynasty, which ruled until c. 960.

The four named succeeding Serbian rulers are not mentioned in the Chronicle of the Priest of Duklja (CPD), a source dating to c. 1300–10 and largely discredited in historiography (the CPD is deemed useless for events in the Early Middle Ages). Instead, the CPD mentions several historically unconfirmed or legendary rulers, Svevlad, Selimir, Vladin and Ratimir, although it maintains the patrilineal succession tradition. According to Sima Lukin Lazić (1863–1904), Prosigoj was dead by the time of a Bulgar attack on Serbia following the Bulgar conquest of Frankish-held Banat and Syrmia.

== See also ==
- List of Serbian monarchs

== Annotations ==
1. In the De Administrando Imperio, his name is spelled Προσηγόης, transcribed in Latin as Prosegoës or Prosegoïs. It is a Slavic dithematic name, derived from the imperative prosi, prositi, meaning "asking, begging", and noun goj, meaning "peace" and "breeding", and is related to the name Prosimir.

== Sources ==
Primary sources

- Moravcsik, Gyula, ed. (1967) [1949]. Constantine Porphyrogenitus: De Administrando Imperio (2nd revised ed.). Washington D.C.: Dumbarton Oaks Center for Byzantine Studies. ISBN 9780884020219.
- Pertz, Georg Heinrich, ed. (1845). Einhardi Annales. Hanover.
- Scholz, Bernhard Walter, ed. (1970). Carolingian Chronicles: Royal Frankish Annals and Nithard's Histories. University of Michigan Press. ISBN 0472061860.
- Кунчер, Драгана (2009). Gesta Regum Sclavorum. Vol. 1. Београд-Никшић: Историјски институт, Манастир Острог.
- Живковић, Тибор (2009). Gesta Regum Sclavorum. Vol. 2. Београд-Никшић: Историјски институт, Манастир Острог.

Secondary sources

- Blagojević, Miloš; Petković, Sreten (1989). Srbija u doba Nemanjića: od kneževine do carstva : 1168-1371 : ilustrovana hronika. TRZ "VAJAT". ISBN 9788670390287.
- Ćirković, Sima (2004). The Serbs. Malden: Blackwell Publishing. ISBN 9781405142915.
- Ćorović, Vladimir (2001) [1997]. Istorija srpskog naroda (Internet ed.). Belgrade: Janus; Ars Libri.
- Fine, John Van Antwerp Jr. (1991) [1983]. The Early Medieval Balkans: A Critical Survey from the Sixth to the Late Twelfth Century. Ann Arbor, Michigan: University of Michigan Press. ISBN 0472081497.
- Ferjančić, Božidar (1959). "Posebna Izdanja - Vizantijski Izvori Za Istoriju Naroda Jugoslavije Tom 2". SAN.
- Samardžić, Radovan; Duškov, Milan (1993). Serbs in European civilization. Nova. p. 24. ISBN 978-86-7583-015-3.
- SANU (1934). Posebna izdanja. Vol. 103. Srpska akademija nauka i umetnosti. p. 11.
- Živković, Tibor (2006). Portreti srpskih vladara (IX—XII vek). Belgrade. pp. 11–20. ISBN 86-17-13754-1.
- Živković, Tibor (2002). Јужни Словени под византијском влашћу, 600-1025. Историјски институт. ISBN 9788677430276.
- Živković, Tibor (2008). Forging unity: The South Slavs between East and West 550-1150. Belgrade: The Institute of History, Čigoja štampa. ISBN 9788675585732.

Prosigoj Vlastimirović dynasty
Regnal titles
Preceded by Radoslav	Prince of Serbia ? – c. 830	Succeeded by Vlastimir
