= Lesnik (Serbia) =

Fortified town in medieval Serbia

Lesnik (Greek: Λεσνήκ) was a fortified town in the early medieval Principality of Serbia, registered by the Byzantine Emperor and writer Constantine Porphyrogenitus (945-959) in his historiographical work De Administrando Imperio. According to that source, Serbian Principality consisted of the following fortifications (καστρα, 'castle'): Destinikon (Δεστινίκον), Černavusk (Τςερναωουσκεή), Međurečje (Μεγυρέτονς), Dresneik (Δρεσνεηκ), Lesnik (Λεσνήκ), Salines (Σαληνέζ), and in the region of Bosnia (Βοσνωνα): Katera (Κατερα) and Desnik (Δεσνήκ).

The location of Lesnik is unknown, but in scholarly literature it has been connected with various toponyms named Lesnik (Ljesnik), or Lešnica (Lješnica). Some scholars have proposed Lešnica near Loznica, pointing to the remains of an old fortress now called Vidin Grad above Jadranska Lešnica, on the Vidojevica mountain, while others have suggested Liješanj near Zvornik in relation to the fortress Kušlat. Some other ubications have been also proposed, and the question is still regarded as opened.

== Sources ==
- Bulić, Dejan (2013). "The Fortifications of the Late Antiquity and the Early Byzantine Period on the Later Territory of the South-Slavic Principalities, and their re-occupation". The World of the Slavs: Studies of the East, West and South Slavs: Civitas, Oppidas, Villas and Archeological Evidence (7th to 11th Centuries AD). Belgrade: The Institute for History. pp. 137–234.
- Jenkins, Romilly, ed. (1962). Constantine Porphyrogenitus: De Administrando Imperio, II: Commentary. London: Athlone Press.
- Jireček, Constantin (1879). Die Handelsstraßen und Bergwerke von Serbien und Bosnien während des Mittelalters: Historisch-geographische Studien. Prag: Königlich-Böhmische Gesellschaft der Wissenschaften.
- Loma, Aleksandar (2000). "Serbisches und kroatisches Sprachgut bei Konstantin Porphyrogennetos". Зборник радова Византолошког института. 38 (1999–2000): 87–161.
- Moravcsik, Gyula; Jenkins, Romilly, eds. (1967) [1949]. Constantine Porphyrogenitus: De Administrando Imperio (2. ed.). Washington: Dumbarton Oaks Center for Byzantine Studies.
