= Destinikon =

Destinikon (Greek: Δεστινίκον), rendered also as Destinik and in Serbian as Dostinik (Serbian Cyrillic: Достиник) or Dostinika (Достиника), was one of eight inhabited cities (καστρα/kastra) of "baptized Serbia" (the hinterland of the Serbian Principality), mentioned in De Administrando Imperio (950s, abbr. DAI). The city's name probably derives from Greek or Latin (Ad Stenes).

The DAI mentions Destinikon as the first among the enumerated cities ("Destinikon, Tzernabouskeï, Megyretous, Dresneïk, Lesnik, Salines, Katera, Desnik") of "baptized Serbia". They were not mentioned afterwards, possibly because of remote location, lost importance or became desolated after Bulgarian Samuel's conquest in the end of the 10th century.

In chapter 32, the DAI tells of Klonimir, an exiled dynastical member in Bulgaria, who marched an army into Serbia, entering the city of Destinikon with the intent of seizing the throne, but was defeated by Prince Petar, in ca. 896.

It is considered that Destinikon was the ecclesiastical centre and capital of early medieval Serbia.

== Studies ==
- Slovak historian P. J. Šafárik (1795–1861) believed it to be on the Lower Drina, near the villages of Disit and Desna.
- Czech historian K. J. Jireček (1854–1918) believed it to have been located west of Ras. This view was supported by Serbian historian S. Stanojević (1874–1937).
- Serbian historian S. Novaković (1842–1915) and K. Grot believed it to be Deževa, in Raška.
- Croatian linguist P. Skok (1881–1956) and Serbian historian V. Korać (1924–2010) believed it to be Drsnik, in Metohija.
- Serbian historian Vladimir Ćorović (1885–1941) deemed the location unknown.
- Aleksandar Deroko (1894–1988) noted that it may have been early Sjenica.
- Ilija Sindik (1953) created a map for Mihailo Dinić's chapter section about early medieval Serbia, placing Destinikon's assumed location in the middle between Lim and Ibar rivers.
- A Serbian source from 1968 considered Metohija.
- R. Novaković (1981), studying fort ruins in the area of the early medieval Serbian state believed Ždrelo or Gradište Gedže, in Orahovac in Western Kosovo, to have been the site. The site, ruins of a fortified city with towers, is located at a hill called Gradiš or Gradeš, dated to the 9th–10th centuries.
- P. Petrović and P. Vlahović (1984) considered that it was most likely southeast of Ras. This presumption was based on the fact that the DAI mentions Klonimir attacking Petar, coming from Bulgaria.
- Serbian historian S. Ćirković (1929–2009) presumed it was on the road "from Ras towards the Lim valley".
- Serbian historian M. Blagojević (1930–2012) believed it to have been in the župa (county) of Hvosno.
- According to Florin Curta (2006), based on the events described, the forts were in what is today central-eastern Bosnia.
- Between 1997-2001 were found remains of a fortification thought to be that of Destinikon in the archaeological site of Vrsjenice, near Sjenica. It was built in the 5th century, abandoned in early 7th century, and renovated in the 9th century. It "shows complete absence of finds Bulgarian in origin" in comparison to Ras-Pazarište and Ras-Postenje, indicating that the border between Serbs/Serbia and Bulgarians/Bulgaria was at Pešter.
- Vladeta Popović in 2013, citing also Aleksandar Loma and Tibor Živković, concluded that the location is still unknown, but Dejan Bulić mentioned possible identification with Vrsjenice.

== Sources ==
- Korać, Vojislav (1995). "Architecture in medieval Serbia". In Ivić, Pavle (ed.). The History of Serbian Culture. Porthill Publishers. ISBN 978-1-870732-31-4.
- Moravcsik, Gyula, ed. (1967) [1949]. Constantine Porphyrogenitus: De Administrando Imperio (2nd revised ed.). Washington D.C.: Dumbarton Oaks Center for Byzantine Studies. ISBN 9780884020219.
- Novaković, Relja (1981). Gde se nalazila Srbija od VII do XII veka: istorijsko-geografsko razmatranje : problemi i znanja. Istorijski institut.
  - Novaković, Relja (2010) [1981]. "Gde se nalazila Srbija od VII do XII veka: Zaključak i rezime monografije" (Internet ed.).
- Petrović, Petar Ž.; Vlahović, Petar (1984). Raška: antropogeografska proučavanja. Etnografski institut Srpske akademije nauka i umetnosti. p. 128.
- Popović, Marko (1999). Tvrđava Ras [The Fortress of Ras] (in Serbian). Belgrade: Archaeological Institute. ISBN 9788680093147.
- Popović, Marko; Bikić, Vesna (2009). Vrsenice : kasnoantičko i srpsko ranosrednjovekovno utvrđenje. Belgrade: Arheološki institut. ISBN 978-86-80093-57-4.
- Šafárik, Pavel Jozef (1837). Slowanské starožitnosti (in Czech). Tiskem I. Spurného.
