= Vojislav of Serbia =

Vojislav of Serbia may refer to:

- Višeslav of Serbia or Vojislav, (r. fl. 768-814) Prince of Serbia
- Vojislav of Duklja, (r. 1018-1043) Prince of Duklja (titular Prince of Serbia)
