= White Serbia =

Putative early medieval homeland of the Serbs

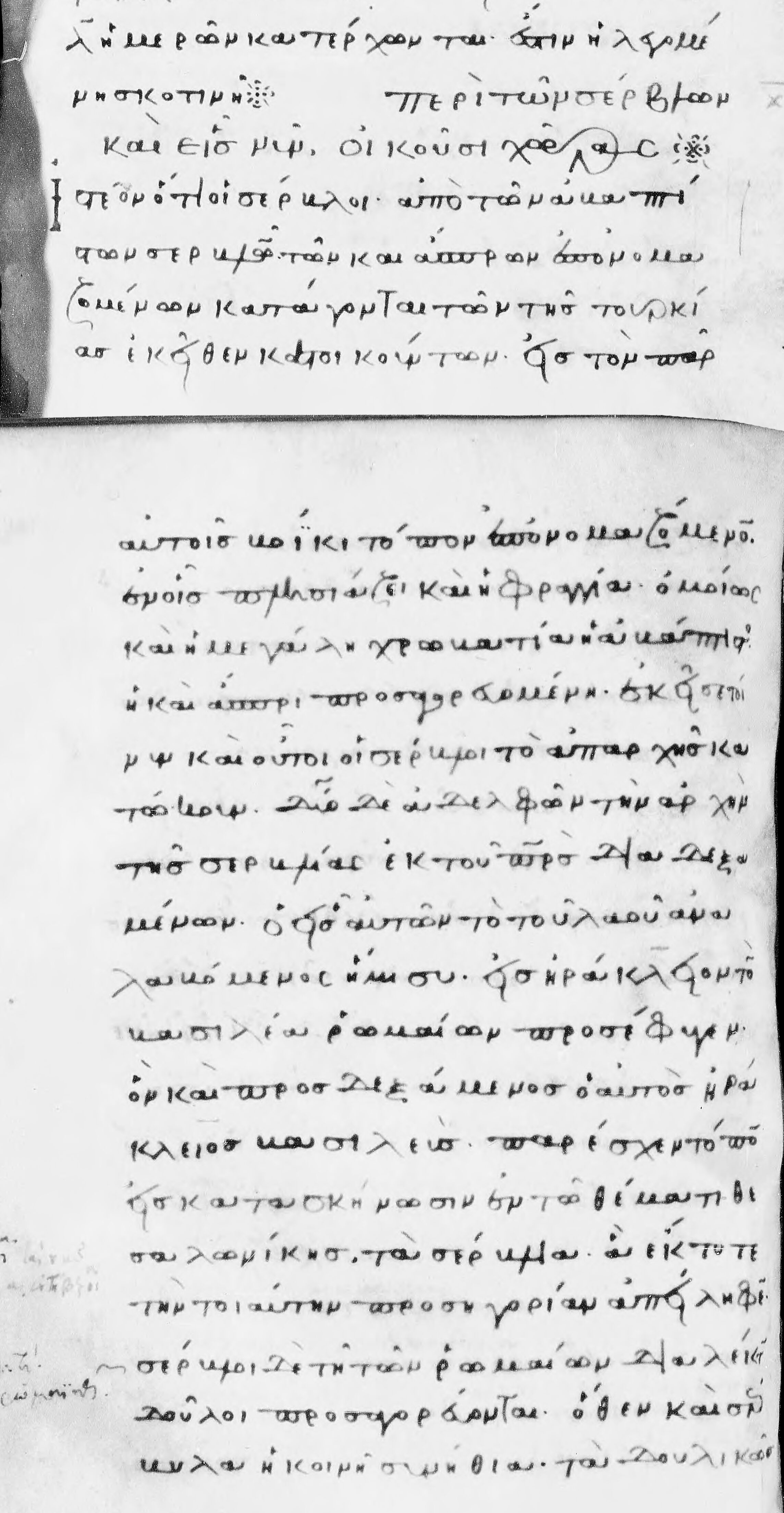
The migration from Boiki described as the origin of the Serbs narrated in De Administrando Imperio. From a 12th-century Byzantine manuscript.

White Serbia is a modern name for an early medieval Serbian homeland, which was initially written about under the name Boiki (Ancient Greek: Βοΐκι) in the 10th-century Byzantine chronicle, De Administrando Imperio. This chronicle reports that a mass migration of unbaptized Serbs (whom it calls "white") led by an unnamed leader set out from there prior to their arrival in Southeastern Europe.

This chronicle and its narrative of a White Serbian homeland have served as the foundation-stone narrative of traditional Serbian historiography. The place commonly identified by these traditional perspectives as White Serbia is an area roughly equivalent to modern Saxony, which was once inhabited by the Sorbs, a tribal group known from Frankish chronicles.

== Location ==
=== Sources ===
The Byzantine Emperor Constantine VII (r. 913–959) in De Administrando Imperio of the mid-10th century recounts in Chapter 31: "These same Croats arrived as refugees to the emperor of the Romaioi [Emperor Heraclius, r. 610–641] before the Serbs came as refugees to the same Emperor Heraclius"; and mainly in Chapter 32:

"It should be known that the Serbs are descended from the unbaptized Serbs, also called ‘white’, who live beyond Hungary, in a region called by them Boïki, where their neighbor is Francia, as is also Megali Croatia, the unbaptized, also called ‘white’. In this place, then, these Serbs also dwelt from the beginning... Now, after the two brothers succeeded their father in the rule of Serbia, one of them, taking one half of the folk, came as the refugee to Heraclius, the emperor of the Romaioi gave them a region in the Thessalonica to settle in, namely Serblia, which from that time has acquired this denomination... Then, after some time these same Serbs decided to depart to their own homes, and the emperor sent them off. And so, when they had crossed the Danube River, they changed their minds and sent a request to the Emperor Heraclius... the emperor settled these same Serbs in these countries".

In the 33rd chapter Constantine writes, "(It should be known) that the clan of the anthypatos and patrikios Michael, son of Visevitz, archon of the Zachlumians, came from the unbaptized inhabitants on the Visla River, called Litziki, and they settled on the river called Zachluma".

A Latin document from the early-10th century states that the "Hungarians moved to Pannonia from Serbia (Ungarorum gens a Servia egressa in Pannoniam)". Tibor Živković suggests that this likely refers to Boïki (Bohemia).

=== Dispute ===
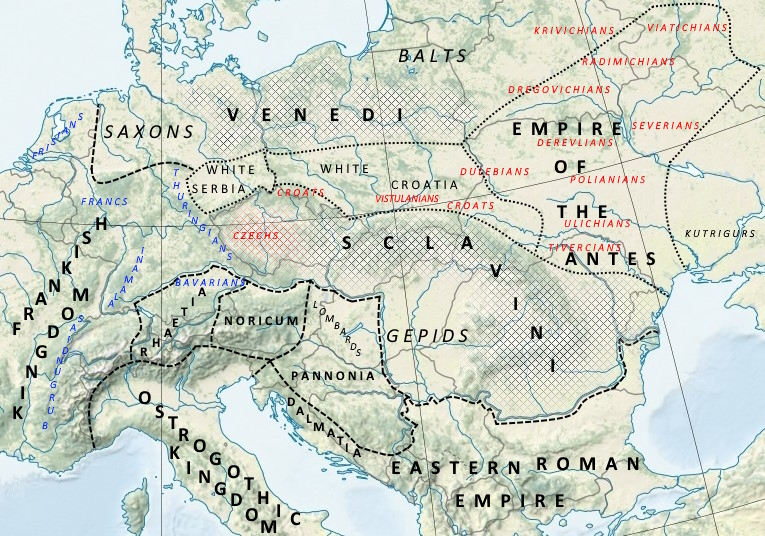
Location of White Serbia cca. 560 AD, according to Francis Dvornik (1949-56).

Theories on the location of the so-called "Boiki" and "White" Serbs have been disputed, but scholars who consider it more than a literary device commonly assume it to have been around the region of Bohemia and Saxony. Since the 19th century, two most prominent theories were of Bohemia, and the land of the Boykos in Eastern Galicia in the Carpathians. The latter was mostly argued by 19th-century scholars, like Pavel Jozef Šafárik (1795–1865) and Henry Hoyle Howorth (1842–1923), who also included the White Serbs among the Polabian Slavs. Rather than relating Boiki and Bohemia, which in turn derived from ethnonym of the Celtic tribe Boii, they related the toponym to the much younger ethnonym of the Rusyns sub-ethnic group Boykos. Béni Kállay (1839–1903) noted that many historians assumed that Serbian territory was identical to the Czech lands (Bohemia) based on DAI's account and the name Bojka, but he also supported Šafárik's thesis. Other scholars who had a similar opinion were Vladimir Ćorović (1885–1941), and Ljubivoje Cerović (b. 1936). However, most scholars like Borivoje Drobnjaković (1890–1961), Andreas Stratos (1905–1981), Sima Ćirković (1929–2009), and Relja Novaković (1911–2003) located them to the West in the area between the Elbe and Saale rivers, roughly between Bohemia and East Germany (Polabia). According to Mykhailo Hrushevsky (1898), Gerard Labuda (1949), Francis Dvornik (1962), Jaroslav Rudnyckyj (1962–1972) and Henryk Łowmiański (1964) unlike Croats, there is no proof that Serbs ever lived within Bohemia or in Eastern Galicia, only that they lived near Bohemia, and the connection between Boiki and Boykos is considered to be scholarly improbable, outdated and rejected.

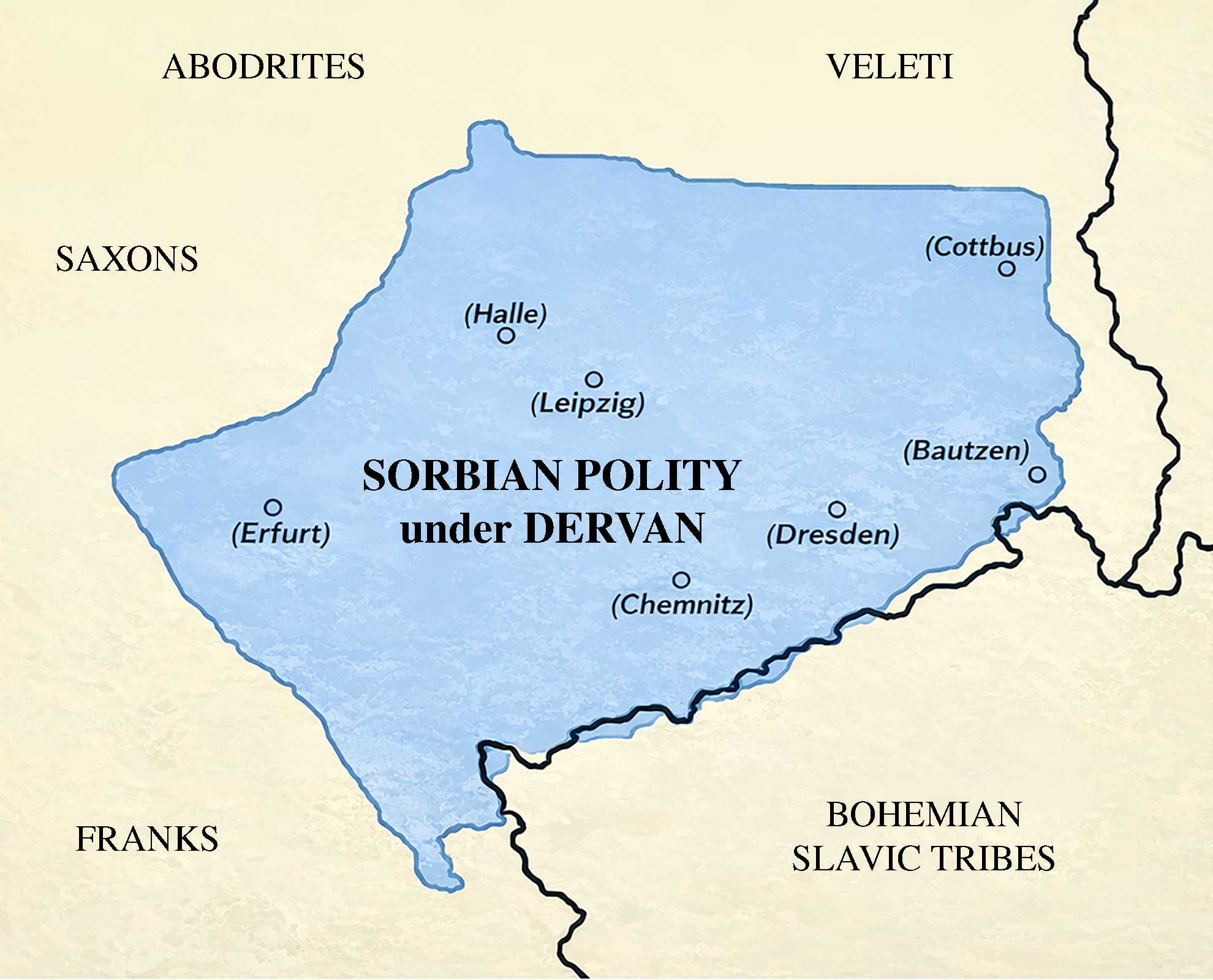
Dervan's Sorbian polity

According to archaeologist V. V. Sedov (1995), the 32nd chapter of De Administrando Imperio indicates that it was located in the Lower Lusatia territory where the Sorbs were located, but the 33rd chapter about Zachlumia caused confusion which resulted with several hypotheses. The first group of scholars argued the homeland existed between rivers Elbe and Saale, the second in the upper course of rivers Vistula and Oder, and the third from Elbe and Saale to the upper course of Vistula. However, Sedov concluded that the archaeological data does not confirm any of these hypotheses, and most plausible is the consideration by Lubor Niederle that there's no evidence that White Serbia ever existed and Constantine VII most probably made up Northern Great Serbia only according to the analogy with Great Croatia, which by other historians also did not exist. According to Tibor Živković, the structure and content of the subchapter about the family of Michael of Zahumlje indicates that this account was likely told by Michael himself. He is not noted as being of Serbian origin. Živković thought Michael's family may have preserved the memory of their tribal origin.

==== Toponyms and antroponyms ====
Tadeusz Lewicki in his toponomastic research of Polish lands found many toponyms documented between 12th and 14th century with a root "Serb-" and "Sarb-" and defined them as both a trace and remnant population of the so-called White Serbs in DAI. Since the 13th and 15th centuries were recorded also personal names and surnames which possibly derive from the ethnonym. However, according to Hanna Popowska-Taborska, the method didn't take into account the unambiguous etymological interpretation of the Serbian ethnonym because of which most probably the majority of the toponyms don't derive from the ethnonym itself. Also, both Łowmiański and Popowska-Taborska found them and their abundance unusual which cannot reflect the early medieval great migration of the Slavs, and it rather describes the Sorbian population living on the Polish territory which was brought there from the Elbe river as captives by the Piast dynasty.

== Gallery ==
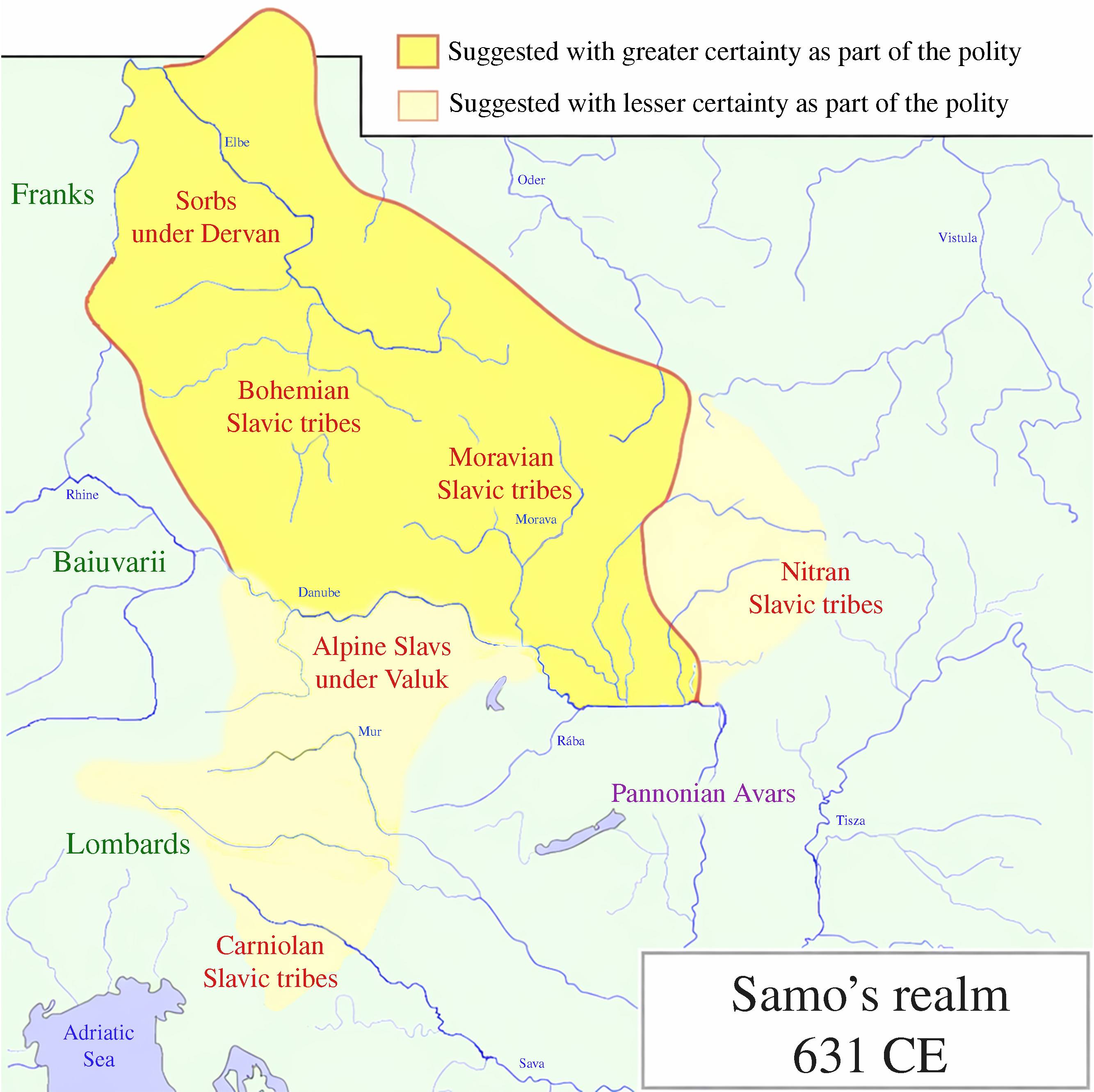
Samo's realm in 631, including Dervan's polity.

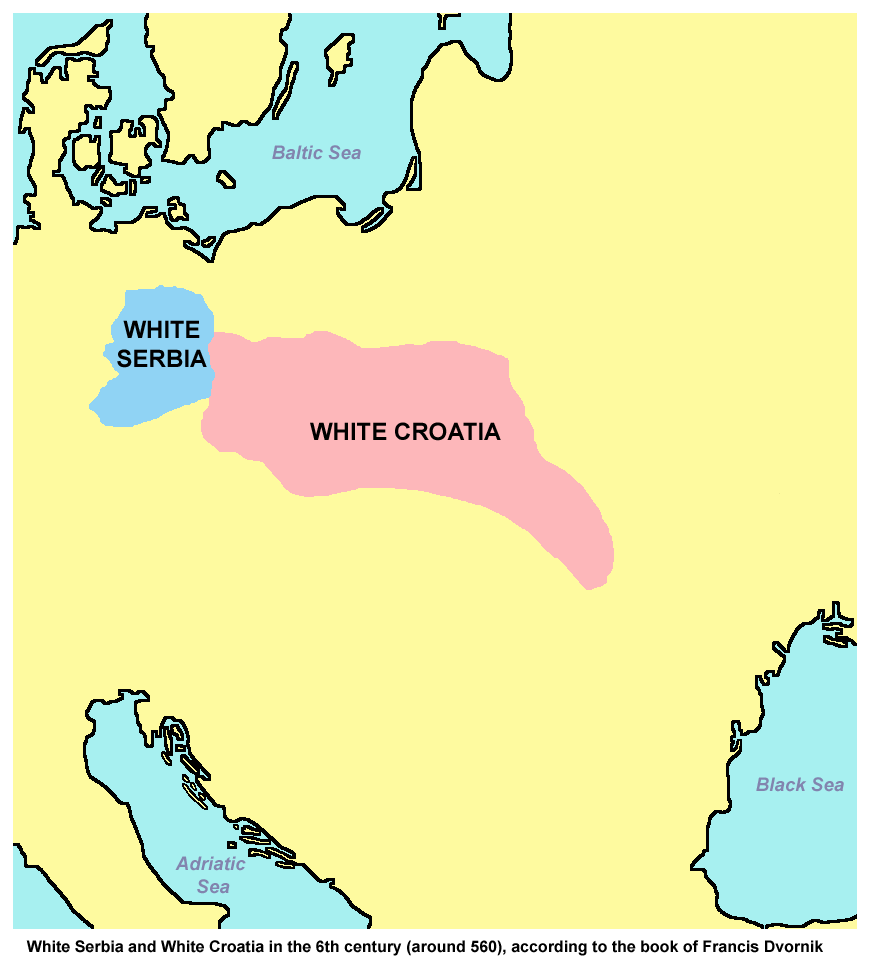
White Serbia and White Croatia (around 560), according to Francis Dvornik (1949).

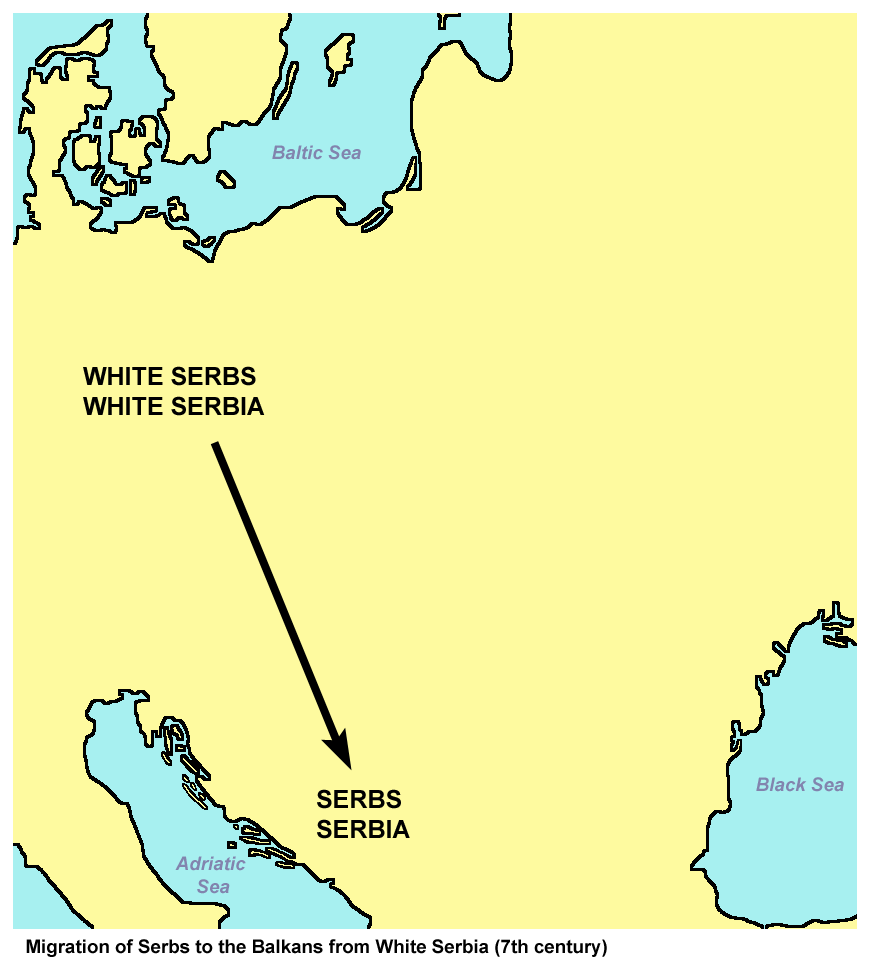
Migration of the Serbs according to the Lusatian theory identifying the Sorbs as the White Serbs.

== See also ==
- List of Medieval Slavic tribes

== Sources ==
- Constantine VII Porphyrogenitus (1967) [1949]. De Administrando Imperio (Moravcsik, Gyula ed.). Washington D.C.: Dumbarton Oaks Center for Byzantine Studies.
- Einhard. Annales regni Francorum [Royal Frankish Annals] (in Latin).
- Ćirković, Sima (2004). The Serbs. Malden: Blackwell Publishing. ISBN 9781405142915.
- Ćorović, Vladimir (2001). Istorija srpskog naroda (Internet ed.). Belgrade: Ars Libri.
- Francis Dvornik; Romilly Jenkins; Bernard Lewis; Gyula Moravcsik; Dimitri Obolensky; Steven Runciman (1962). Jenkins, Romilly (ed.). De Administrando Imperio: Volume II Commentary. London: The Athlone Press, University of London. ISBN 978-0-88402-021-9.
- Fine, John Van Antwerp (1991). The Early Medieval Balkans: A Critical Survey from the Sixth to the Late Twelfth Century. Michigan: The University of Michigan Press. ISBN 978-0-472-08149-3.
- Ferjančić, Božidar (1959). Vizantiski izvori za istoriju naroda Jugoslavije. Vol. 2. Vizantološki institut SANU. pp. 5, 47.
- Летопис Матице српске. Vol. 141–144. У Српској народној задружној штампарији. 1885. p. 145.
- Majorov, Aleksandr Vjačeslavovič (2012), Velika Hrvatska: etnogeneza i rana povijest Slavena prikarpatskoga područja [Great Croatia: ethnogenesis and early history of Slavs in the Carpathian area] (in Croatian), Zagreb, Samobor: Brethren of the Croatian Dragon, Meridijani, ISBN 978-953-6928-26-2
- Novak, Viktor (1973). Istoriski časopis. Vol. 20. Prosveta. p. 7.
- Sedov, Valentin Vasilyevich (2013) [1995]. Славяне в раннем Средневековье [Sloveni u ranom srednjem veku (Slavs in Early Middle Ages)]. Novi Sad: Akademska knjiga. ISBN 978-86-6263-026-1.
- The South Slav Journal. Vol. 22–23. Dositey Obradovich Circle. 2001. p. 149.
- Zbigniew Gołąb (1992). The origins of the Slavs: a linguist's view. Slavica Publishers, Inc. p. 397. ISBN 978-0-89357-224-2.
- Živković, Tibor (2012). De conversione Croatorum et Serborum: A Lost Source. Belgrade: The Institute of History.
