= Romilly Jenkins =

British academic (1907–1969)

Romilly James Heald Jenkins (10 February 1907 – 30 September 1969) was a British scholar in Byzantine and Modern Greek studies. He occupied the prestigious seat of Koraes Professor of Modern Greek and Byzantine History, Language and Literature at King's College London, from 1946 to 1960.

== Life ==
Jenkins was born in Hitchin, Hertfordshire, the son of James Heald Jenkins and Theodora née Ingram. He attended The Leys School, Cambridge, and Emmanuel College, Cambridge, where he graduated with a first in parts I and II of the classical tripos and was awarded the Davies Scholarship, the Prendergast Greek Studentship, and, most significantly, the Chancellor's Classical Medal.

Following graduation, Jenkins went to Greece as a student at the British School at Athens, staying in residence from 1930 to 1934. There he served as assistant director, and since 1936 as a member of the Board of the Managing Committee; 1948 he was named a trustee, and from 1951 to 1958 he served as Chairman of the Managing Committee.

From 1936 to 1946 he was Lewis Gibson Lecturer in Modern Greek at the University of Cambridge. During World War II he served with the British Foreign Service. In 1946 he was appointed Koraes Professor of Modern Greek and Byzantine History, Language and Literature at King’s College London, as well as Honorary Lecturer in Classical Archaeology. From 1960 until his death he was Professor of Byzantine History and Literature at the Dumbarton Oaks institute.

== Writings ==
- Dedalica. A study of Dorian plastic art in the seventh century B.C. Cambridge University Press, Cambridge, 1936.
- Dionysius Solomos, the First Major Modern Greek Poet. Cambridge University Press, Cambridge, 1940. Reprint: Denise Harvey & Company, Athens, 1981.
- The Byzantine Empire on the Eve of the Crusades. Published for the Historical Association by Philip, [London], 1953.
- Richard MacGillivray Dawkins, 1871–1955, in: Proceedings of the British Academy 41 (1955) pp. 373–88.
- The Dilessi Murders: Greek Brigands and English Hostages. Longmans, London, 1961. Reprint: Prion, London, 1998, ISBN 1-85375-280-0.
- The Hellenistic origins of Byzantine literature. Washington DC, 1963.
- Byzantium: The Imperial Centuries AD 610–1071. Weidenfeld & Nicolson, London, 1966. Reprint: Medieval Academy of America 1987, ISBN 0-8020-6667-4
- Constantine Porphyrogenitus: De Administrando Imperio. Ed. Gyula Moravcsik, transl. Romilly James Heald Jenkins. Budapest 1949; 2nd Ed., Washington, DC, 1968, reprinted 2008, ISBN 0-88402-343-5. Croatian edition: Konstantin Porfirogenet, O upravljanju carstvom, prijevod i komentari Nikola pl. Tomašić (hrvatski), R. [Romilly] J. [James] H. [Heald] Jenkins (engleski), priređivač grčkog izvornika Gyula Moravcsik, Zagreb: Dom i svijet (Biblioteka Povjesnica), 2003. ISBN 953-6491-90-7.
- Studies on Byzantine history of the 9th and 10th centuries. Variorum Reprints, London, 1970, ISBN 0-902089-07-2.
