= De Administrando Imperio =

10th-century Byzantine work

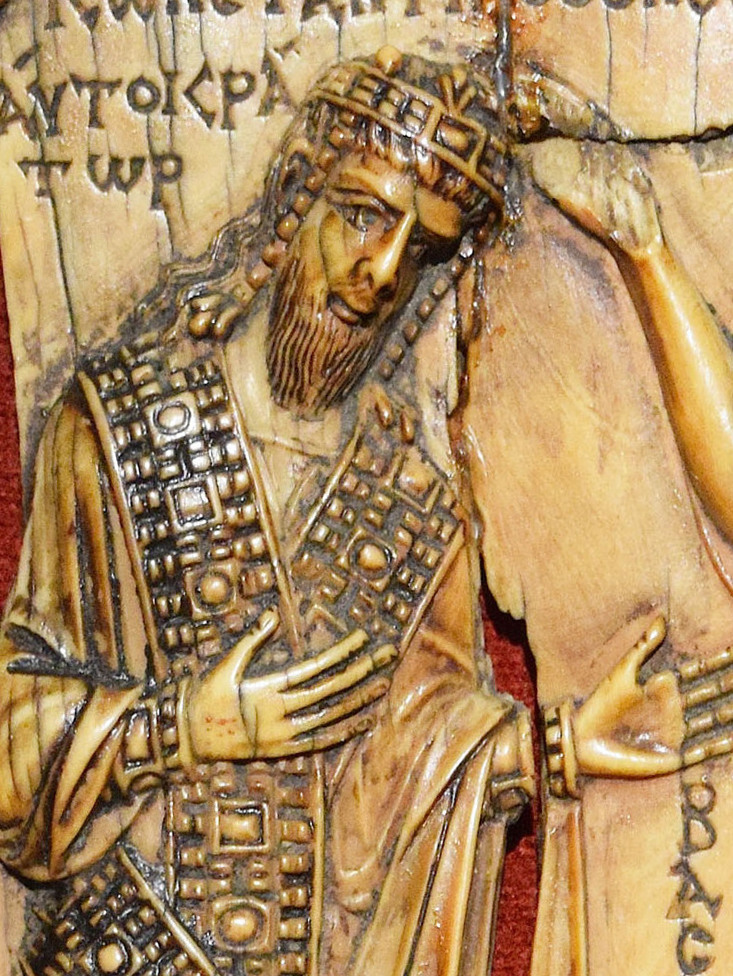
Constantine VII Porphyrogenitus in a 945 carved ivory.

De Administrando Imperio (lit. 'On imperial administration'; Greek: Πρὸς τὸν ἴδιον υἱὸν Ῥωμανόν, lit. 'to my son Romanos') is a Greek-language historiographical work written by the 10th-century Byzantine Emperor Constantine VII (945–959). It is a domestic and foreign policy manual for the use of Constantine's son and successor, the Emperor Romanos II (959–963). It is a prominent example of Byzantine encyclopaedism.

== Author and background ==
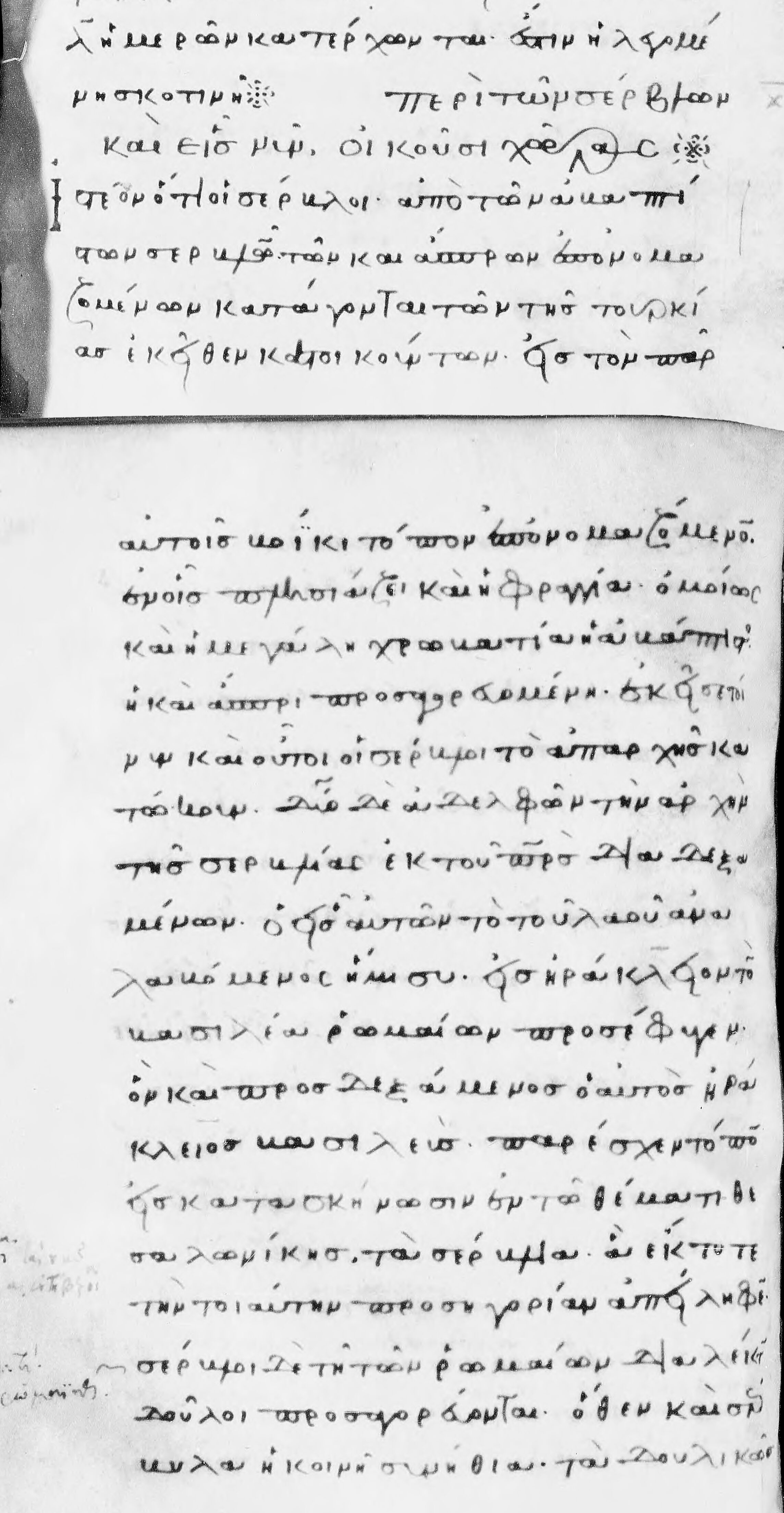
Codex Parisinus gr. 2009 (fol 93r-93v): The earliest known (11th century) manuscript of the De Administrando Imperio

The emperor Constantine VII "Porphyrogenitus" (905–959) was only surviving son of the emperor Leo VI the Wise (886–912). Leo VI gave the crown to young Constantine VII in 908 and he became the co-emperor. Leo VI died in May 912, and his brother and co-emperor Alexander became the ruler of Constantinople, but Alexander died in 913.

Constantine VII was too young to rule on his own, and the governorship was created. Later in May 919 Constantine VII married Helena Lekapene, daughter of Romanos Lekapenos. In December 920, Romanos I Lekapenos (920–944) was crowned a co-emperor, but he really took over the imperial reign in Constantinople. From 920, Constantine VII become increasingly distant from the imperial authorities; until December 944, when the sons of Emperor Romanos I suddenly rebelled and cloistered their father. Constantine VII, with the help of his supporters, cloistered his brothers-in-law, and personally ruled by the Eastern Roman Empire from January 945 to his death in November 959.

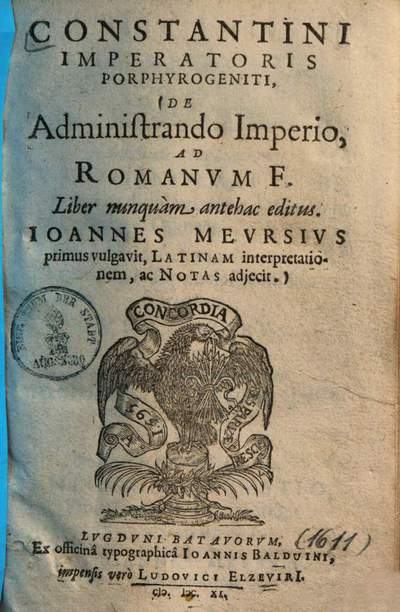
The first printed edition of De Administrando Imperio (1611)

Constantine's father, Leo, was known for his learning and writings, and, correctly or not, Constantine VII also believed that his mother, Zoe Karbonopsina, was a relative of the chronicler Theophanes the Confessor, one of the Middle Byzantine Historians. Constantine VII was a scholar-emperor, who sought to foster learning and education in the empire. He gathered a group of educated people and dedicated himself to writing books about the administration, ceremonies, and history of the empire. A circle of educated people formed around Constantine VII wrote three unfinished books (De Administrando Imperio, De Ceremoniis and On the Themes) and finished a biography of his grandfather, Basil I.

The text known as De Administrando Imperio was written by emperor Constantine VII Porphyrogenitus, but he had at least one educated "Anonymous Collaborator". Constantine VII's direct appeals to his son Romanus II and Constantine's first-person commentaries are located both at the beginning of the treatise in the Proem and in chapter 13, as well as at the end of the text, in chapter 51. In this text his son Romanus II is never designated as a self-sustained ruler. Thus, the whole De Administrando Imperio must have been written while Constantine VII was still alive.

It is said that De Administrando Imperio was written between 948 and 952. Chapters 27, 29, and 45 of the work support that view. Chapter 29 says, "now (today) is the VII indiction, the year 6457 from the creation of the world," and Byzantine year 6457 from the creation of the world corresponds with 948/949. Chapter 45 says, "now (today) is the X indiction, the year from the creation of the world 6460 in the reign of Constantine [VII] and Romanus [II]," and Byzantine year 6460 from the creation of the world corresponds with 951/952. From this, it would appear that some parts of the work were written in the period 948-952. According to other researchers, De Administrando Imperio was compiled at some point after 952 and before November 959 when Constantine VII died. Still others believe the book just an unfinished manuscript written between about 926 and November 959.

In the beginning of the De Administrando Imperio, Constantine VII wrote that the work was a set of knowledge which his son Romanos II (born in 938, and ruled 959–963) will need. The intention of Emperor Constantine VII to write a manual for his successor, Romanos II, reduces the possibility that large untruths have been written. Therefore, De Administrando Imperio is one of the most important sources for the study of the Eastern Roman Empire (Byzantium) and its neighbors.

It contains advice on ruling the heterogeneous empire as well as fighting foreign enemies. The work combines two of Constantine's earlier treatises, "On the Governance of the State and the various Nations" (Περὶ Διοικήσεως τοῦ Κράτους βιβλίον καὶ τῶν διαφόρων Ἐθνῶν), concerning the histories and characters of the nations neighbouring the Empire, including the Hungarians, Pechenegs, Kievan Rus', South Slavs, Arabs, Lombards, Armenians, and Georgians; and the "On the Themes of East and West" (Περὶ θεμάτων Ἀνατολῆς καὶ Δύσεως, known in Latin as De Thematibus), concerning recent events in the imperial provinces. To this combination were added Constantine's own political instructions to his son, Romanus.

== Content ==
The book content, according to its preface, is divided into four sections:

- a key to the foreign policy in the most dangerous and complicated area of the contemporary political scene, the area of northerners and Scythians,
- a lesson in the diplomacy to be pursued in dealing with the nations of the same area
- a comprehensive geographic and historical survey of most of the surrounding nations and
- a summary of the recent internal history, politics and organization of the Empire.

As to the historical and geographic information, which is often confusing and filled with legends, this information is in essence reliable.

The historical and antiquarian treatise, which the Emperor had compiled during the 940s, is contained in the chapters 12–40. This treatise contains traditional and legendary stories of how the territories surrounding the Empire came in the past to be occupied by the people living in them in the Emperor's times (Saracens, Lombards, Venetians, Serbs, Croats, Magyars, Pechenegs). Chapters 1–8, 10—12 explain imperial policy toward the Pechenegs and Turks. Chapter 13 is a general directive on foreign policy coming from the Emperor. Chapters 43—46 are about contemporary policy in the north-east (Armenia and Georgia). The guides to the incorporation and taxation of new imperial provinces, and to some parts of civil and naval administration, are in chapters 49–52. These later chapters (and chapter 53) were designed to give practical instructions to the emperor Romanus II, and are probably added during the year 951–52, in order to mark Romanus' fourteenth birthday (952).

== Manuscripts and editions ==
There are four surviving copies:

Name	Copier	Year		Location
P = codex Parisinus gr. 2009	Michael (John Doukas' confidential secretary)	late 11th century	Earliest copy	Bibliothèque Nationale, Paris
V = codex Vaticanus-Palatinus gr. 126	Antony Eparchus	1509	Notes in Greek and Latin added by later readers	Vatican Library
F = codex Parisinus gr. 2967	Eparchus, then Michael Damascene	1509–1529 (?)	Copy of V	Bibliothèque Nationale, Paris
M = codex Mutinensis gr. 179	Andrea Darmari	1560–1586 (?)	Copy (incomplete) of P	Modena

The Greek text in its entirety was published seven times. The editio princeps, which was based on V, was published in 1611 by Johannes Meursius, who gave it the Latin title by which it is now universally known, and which translates as On Administering the Empire. This edition was published six years later with no changes. The next edition was published by Anselmo Banduri (1711), as a collated copy of the first edition and manuscript P. Banduri's edition was reprinted twice: in 1729 in the Venetian collection of the Byzantine Historians, and in 1864 Migne republished Banduri's text with a few corrections. In 1840, an edition of Immanuel Bekker was also published, in the Corpus Scriptorum Historiae Byzantinae.

Constantine himself had not given the work a name, preferring instead to start the text with the standard formal salutation: "Constantine, in Christ the Eternal Sovereign, Emperor of the Romans, to [his] own son Romanos, the Emperor crowned of God and born in the purple".

== Language ==
The language Constantine uses is rather straightforward High Medieval Greek, somewhat more elaborate than that of the Canonic Gospels, and easily comprehensible to an educated modern Greek. The only difficulty is the regular use of technical terms which – being in standard use at the time – may present prima facie hardships to a modern reader. For example, Constantine writes of the regular practice of sending basilikoí (lit. "royals") to distant lands for negotiations. In this case, it is merely meant that "royal men", i.e. imperial envoys, were sent as ambassadors on a specific mission. In the preamble, the emperor makes a point that he has avoided convoluted expressions and "lofty Atticisms" on purpose, so as to make everything "plain as the beaten track of common, everyday speech" for his son and those high officials with whom he might later choose to share the work. It is probably the extant written text that comes closest to the vernacular employed by the imperial palace bureaucracy in 10th-century Constantinople.

== Modern editions ==
In 1892 R. Vari planned a new critical edition of this work, and J. B. Bury later proposed to include this work in his collection of Byzantine Texts. He gave up the plan for an edition, surrendering it to Gyula Moravcsik in 1925. The first modern edition of the Greek text (by Moravscik) and its English translation (by R. J. H. Jenkins) appeared in Budapest in 1949. An accompanying collection of analyses and commentaries was published in 1962, followed by the second edition of Moravcsik's and Jenkins' work in 1967, and the third in 1993 (Dumbarton Oaks Research Library and Collection, Washington D.C.).

== Sources ==
- Bandurius, Anselmus (1711). Imperium Orientale sive Antiquitates Constantinopolitanae. Vol. 1. Parisius: Coignard.
- Bekkerus, Immanuel, ed. (1840). Constantinus Porphyrogenitus: De thematibus et De administrando imperio. Bonna: Impensis Weberi.
- Bury, John Bagnell, ed. (1920). Constantine VII Porphyrogenitus, The early history of the Slavonic settlements in Dalmatia, Croatia, & Serbia - De administrando Imperio, Chapters 29-36. London-New York: Society for promoting Christian knowledge-Macmillan.
- Ферјанчић, Божидар (1959). "Константин VII Порфирогенит". Византиски извори за историју народа Југославије. Vol. 2. Београд: Византолошки институт. pp. 1–98.
- Jenkins, Romilly, ed. (1962). Constantine Porphyrogenitus: De Administrando Imperio, II: Commentary. London: Athlone Press.
- Komatina, Predrag (2010). "O hronologiji hrvatskih vladara u 31. glavi spisa De administrando imperio". Radovi Zavoda za hrvatsku povijest. 42: 83–105.
- Komatina, Predrag (2019). "Constantine Porphyrogenitus, De Administrando Imperio and the Byzantine Historiography of the Mid-10th Century" (PDF). Зборник радова Византолошког института. 56: 39–68. Archived from the original (PDF) on 2026-03-02.
- Komatina, Predrag (2021). "The Kangar of De administrando imperio and the Hungarian-Bashkir Controversy". Byzanz und das Abendland. Vol. 7. Budapest: Eötvös-József-Collegium. pp. 205–223.
- Литаврин, Г. Г., ed. (1989). Константин Багрянородный: Об управлении империей: текст, перевод, комментарий. Москва: Наука.
- Meursius, Ioannes, ed. (1611). Constantini Imperatoris Porphyrogeniti, De Administrando Imperio. Lugduni Batavorum: Ludovici Elzeviri.
- Moravcsik, Gyula; Jenkins, Romilly, eds. (1967) [1949]. Constantine Porphyrogenitus: De Administrando Imperio (2. ed.). Washington: Dumbarton Oaks Center for Byzantine Studies.
- Ostrogorsky, George (1956). History of the Byzantine State. Oxford: Basil Blackwell.
- Острогорский, Георгий A. (2011). История Византийского государства. Москва: Сибирская Благозвонница.
- Shchavelev, Aleksei S (2019). "Treatise De Administrando Imperio by Emperor Constantine VII Porphyrogenitus: Date of the Paris gr. 2009 Copy, Years of Compiling of the Original Codex, and a Hypothesis about the Number of Authors [in Studia Ceranea 9, 2019]". Studia Ceranea. Journal of the Waldemar Ceran Research Centre for the History and Culture of the Mediterranean Area and South-East Europe. 9: 681–704. doi:10.18778/2084-140X.09.33. hdl:11089/38881. S2CID 216542816.
- Treadgold, Warren (2013). The Middle Byzantine Historians. New York: Palgrave Macmillan.
- Živković, Tibor (2006). "Constantine Porhyrogenitus and the Ragusan Authors before 1611" (PDF). Историјски часопис. 53: 145–164. Archived from the original (PDF) on 2018-03-24.
- Živković, Tibor (2007). "Contribution to the New Reading about the Constantine Porphyrogenitus` Statement on the Numbers of Croat Horsemen, Foot Soldiers and Sailors in Early 10th Century". Byzantinoslavica. 65: 143–151.
- Živković, Tibor (2008). "Constantine Porphyrogenitus' Kastra oikoumena in the Southern Slavs Principalities" (PDF). Историјски часопис. 57: 9–28. Archived from the original (PDF) on 2018-03-24.
- Živković, Tibor (2010). "Constantine Porphyrogenitus' Source on the Earliest History of the Croats and Serbs". Radovi Zavoda Za Hrvatsku Povijest U Zagrebu. 42: 117–131.
- Živković, Tibor (2012). De conversione Croatorum et Serborum: A Lost Source (PDF). Belgrade: The Institute of History. Archived from the original (PDF) on 2026-02-19.
