= Tibor Živković =

Serbian historian (1966–2013)

- Born: 11 March 1966
- Died: 26 March 2013 (aged 47)
- Education: University of Belgrade
- Occupation: Historian

Tibor Živković (Serbian Cyrillic: Тибор Живковић; 11 March 1966 – 26 March 2013) was a Serbian historian and Byzantinist who specialised in the period of the Early Middle Ages.

== Biography ==
Živković was born in Mostar, and studied history at the Faculty of Philosophy at the University of Belgrade, graduating in 1990 from the Department of Antiquity. He earned his MA in 1996 with the thesis Slavizacija na teritoriju Srbije VII-XI stoljeća (Slavicization on the Territory of Serbia in the 7th–11th Centuries), and his PhD in 2000 with the dissertation Slavs under Byzantine Rule from the 7th to 11th Centuries (until 1025). During his doctoral studies, from 1997 to 1999, he was the recipient of a scholarship from the Government of Greece; he conducted postdoctoral research at the Institute for Byzantine Research of the National Hellenic Research Foundation on a fellowship from the Ministry of Science and Technological Development of Serbia.

As of 1997, he worked at the Institute of History of the Serbian Academy of Sciences and Arts (SANU), where he was the director from 2002 to 2010, as well as editor in chief of the Drafting Committee for its editions.

He was a team leader in archaeological excavations along the Ibar River between 2003 and 2009, and taught general medieval studies in the Faculty of Philosophy at the University of Banja Luka.

== Publications ==
Živković published extensively. His field of research encompassed the early medieval history of the South Slavs on the territories of Serbia, Bosnia, Croatia, Bulgaria, and Greece. He focused on the history of the Serbs during this period, but he also provided new insights on De Administrando Imperio, the work of the Byzantine emperor Constantine VII. His main theory was that the chapters devoted to Croats and Serbs were largely based on a lost source written by Anastasius Bibliothecarius in the late 9th century, hypothetically called De conversione Croatorum et Serborum. Živković also worked on the Chronicle of the Priest of Duklja (Latin: Gesta regum Sclavorum), an early history of the Western South Slav territories and their rulers.

=== Books ===
- Živković, Tibor; Bojanin, Stanoje; Petrović, Vladeta, eds. (2000). Selected Charters of Serbian Rulers (XII-XV Century): Relating to the Territory of Kosovo and Metohia. Center for Studies of Byzantine Civilisation, Athens.
- Živković, Tibor (2000). Словени и Ромеји: Славизација на простору Србије од VII до XI века [Slavs and Romans]. Историјски институт САНУ, Службени гласник. ISBN 9788677430221.
- Živković, Tibor (2002). Јужни Словени под византијском влашћу 600-1025 [South Slavs under the Byzantine Rule 600-1025]. Историјски институт САНУ, Службени гласник. ISBN 9788677430276.
- Živković, Tibor (2004). Црквена организација у српским земљама: Рани средњи век [Organization of the Church in Serbian Lands: Early Middle Ages]. Историјски институт САНУ, Службени гласник. ISBN 9788677430443.
- Živković, Tibor (2006). Портрети српских владара: IX-XII век [Portraits of Serbian Rulers: IX-XII century]. Завод за уџбенике и наставна средства, Београд. ISBN 9788617137548.
- Živković, Tibor (2008). Forging unity: The South Slavs between East and West 550-1150. Belgrade: The Institute of History, Čigoja štampa. ISBN 9788675585732.
- Živković, Tibor (2009). Gesta Regum Sclavorum. Vol. 2. Историјски институт Београд, Манастир Острог. ISBN 9788677430757.
- Živković, Tibor (2012). De conversione Croatorum et Serborum: A Lost Source. Belgrade: The Institute of History – via Academia.edu.
- Živković, Tibor (2013). De conversione Croatorum et Serborum: Изгубљени извор Константина Порфирогенита. Београд: Завод за уџбенике.
