= 10th century in Serbia =

Events from the 10th century in, or regarding, Historic Serbia or Serbs.

== Monarchs ==
The following, of the Vlastimirović dynasty, ruled Serbia:

- Petar (892–917)
- Pavle (917–921)
- Zaharija (921–924)
- Časlav (933–943/960)

== Events ==
- 914–917
  - Byzantines sends envoys to Serbs and Magyars regarding an alliance against the Bulgarians.
  - Prince Petar of Serbia annexes Bosnia and Pagania.
  - Prince Petar comes into conflict with Michael of Zahumlje.
  - Michael warns the Bulgarians about the Serbian-Byzantine alliance.
- 917
  - End of 20-year-peace between Serbia and Bulgaria;
  - Prince Petar defends an attack by his cousin and Bulgarian ally Pavle.
  - Prince Petar is captured by Bulgarian generals, sent to jail in Bulgaria, and dies within a year.
  - Pavle becomes the Serbian Prince.
- 920
  - Prince Pavle defends an attack by his cousin and Byzantine ally Zaharija.
  - Zaharija is handed over to Symeon of Bulgaria.
  - Prince Pavle switches to Byzantine support.
- 921–922
  - Zaharija is dispatched with Bulgarian troops and there is no more mention of Pavle.
  - Zaharija becomes the Serbian Prince.
  - Zaharija reavows his loyalty to the Byzantine Empire.
- 923
  - Zaharija united several Slav tribes along the common border to revolt against Bulgaria. Symeon sent an insufficient number of troops to quell the rebels; several Bulgarian generals were killed, their heads and weapons were sent to Constantinople by Zaharija as gifts and signs of loyalty.
- 924
  - Časlav is dispatched with Bulgarian troops, forcing Zaharija into exile in Croatia.
  - Symeon summons the Serbian nobility, to pay homage to their new Prince, Časlav, but instead of instating him, Symeon takes them captive, annexing Serbia.
- 925
  - Michael of Zahumlje disappears from sources.
- 893–927
  - a church is built in Sočanica.
- 927
  - Croatian-Bulgar battle in eastern Bosnia
- 927 or 933
  - Časlav returns to Serbia.
  - Časlav reorganized and repopulated the principality with the Byzantine help.
- before 960
  - The Magyars invade Bosnia.
  - Časlav and his army defeats the Magyars. Kisa, the Magyar Duke, is killed by Tihomir. (see Battle of Drina)
  - Tihomir receives the Drina župania and marries the daughter of Časlav.
- after 960
  - Kisa's widow returns with an army. Časlav is captured and killed.
  - Tihomir becomes the Serbian Prince.
- 961–962
  - Saqaliba (Slavs) in the mountainous regions of Central Balkans, "west of the Bulgarians and east from the other Slavs (Croats)", have the reputation of being "the most courageous and violent".
- 968–971
  - Sviatoslav's invasion of Bulgaria
- 969–971
  - Serbia is conquered by the Byzantines.
- 971–976
  - The Catepanate of Ras is established. "John" was the protospatharios and katepano of Ras.
- ca. 990
  - Jovan Vladimir is born.
- 992
  - A Serbian diplomatic mission, possibly sent from Duklja, arrives in the Byzantine capital of Constantinople and was recorded in a charter of the Great Lavra Monastery, written in 993.
- 998
  - Rascia and Bosnia is annexed by Bulgaria.
- early 10th century
  - Čučimir, of the Belojević noble family, holds Travunia.
- 968–1018
  - Byzantine conquest of Bulgaria
- 10th- or 11th century
  - "Peter" was the archon of Duklja.
  - Emperor Basil II (976–1025) installed a garrison in Belgrade.
