= Časlav =

Serbian ruler in the 10th century

- archon (ἄρχων)

Prince of Serbia
- Reign: 927/928 to before 945
- Predecessor: Zaharija
- Successor: Unknown
- Born: 870s Pliska, Bulgarian Khanate
- Died: possibly 943/944; Serbia
Names
- Časlav Klonimirović
- Dynasty: Vlastimirović
- Father: Klonimir
- Religion: Christian

Časlav (Serbian Cyrillic: Часлав) was the ruler of Serbia from 927/928 to possibly 943/944. Časlav belonged to an exiled branch of the Serbian dynasty and was brought up in Bulgaria as a political hostage. Following years of Bulgarian-Serbian conflict, he was sent with the Bulgarian army against Serbian ruler Zaharija in 924 or 925/926, and was to be instated as the Serbian ruler when Zaharija fled the country. On the premise of accepting Časlav as the new ruler, the Bulgars assembled Serbian župani (counts) and then tricked them and had them captured with Časlav and imprisoned in Bulgaria. After the death of powerful Bulgarian emperor Simeon in 927, Časlav escaped captivity and returned to Serbia, where he consolidated power with the help of Byzantine emperor Romanos Lekapenos (r. 920–944). Časlav was active during the threat of the Magyars (Hungary) and is mentioned in a later legendary account as having been captured and drowned in the Sava river.

== Background and early life ==
The history of the Serbian principalities and the Vlastimirović dynasty is known from the De Administrando Imperio (DAI) compiled by Byzantine emperor Constantine VII Porphyrogenitus (r. 913–959) between 948 and 952. Part of the data collected by Constantine VII came from the Serbs themselves, and it is likely Časlav's diplomatic envoy informed the Byzantine court of Romanos and Constantine VII on Serbian affairs. Serbia and Bulgaria came into contact in the mid-9th century, and Bulgaria had up until then expanded their territory in the Balkan interior by taking Byzantine territory. Byzantium and Bulgaria also had a rivalry regarding influence on the peoples in the central Balkans. The DAI speaks of changing outcomes in 9th-century Bulgar–Serb conflicts, which themselves were a consequence and reflection of the Byzantine–Bulgarian wars. When Serbian ruler Vlastimir died, the rule of Serbia was divided among his sons Mutimir, Strojimir and Gojnik. The division of land shows patrimonialism in the ruling family, also found among some other early medieval peoples; while the territory of each brother is unknown, Mutimir, as the oldest, would have primacy among the three.

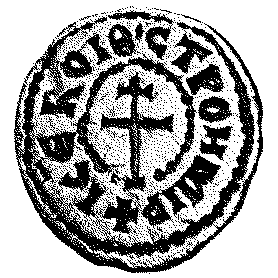
Seal of Strojimir, Časlav's grandfather.

Some time after the Bulgar–Serb war, the three sons of Vlastimir came into conflict and Mutimir captured his two brothers and expelled them to Bulgaria. Strojimir and Gojnik were thus stripped of their rule and sent as political hostages, and this is dated to 855/856 or the 860s. The golden seal of Strojimir has survived, and it features a cross and the Greek inscription of his name. Strojimir's son, Klonimir (born c. 850), wed a Bulgarian noblewoman, the marriage initiated by the Bulgar khan Boris, as to connect the Serbian dynasty to the Bulgarian court. It is possible that the noblewoman belonged to the family of Bulgarian boyar Časlav (Greek: Τζασελάβος) who received Methodios' disciples that were expelled from Moravia following his death (885).

Časlav was born before 889, according to T. Živković in the 870s, likely at the Bulgarian capital Pliska where political hostages were supervised near the court. When Simeon I succeeded the throne in 893 and transferred the capital to Preslav, most likely Časlav also moved there. His father Klonimir tried to take the Serbian throne from his cousin Petar Gojniković, and managed to take the city of Destinikon, but failed and was killed in 897. Petar ruled Serbia with friendly relations to both Bulgaria and Byzantium, and Časlav did not yet have the opportunity to wrest the throne, although he could at any time be used by the Bulgars to claim it.

In 921, Byzantine emperor Romanos Lekapenos (r. 920–944) sent Zaharija to take the Serbian throne from Pavle, but he failed, and then succeeded with the help of the Bulgars, whom he then turned against. Some time between 921 and 923, Zaharija fought off a Bulgarian invasion and sent the heads and weapons of two slain commanders to the Byzantine emperor. In 925/926 Simeon sent a large army against Serbia under the command of Bulgar boyars with the ranks of kavkhan, minik and ichirgu-boila (as he had done against Constantinople in 923), which Časlav, and this campaign would have a decisive outcome for Serbia and its role in the Byzantine–Bulgarian war. Fearing the larger Bulgarian army, considerably larger than the previous one, Zaharija fled to Croatia.

It was a punitive expedition meant to destroy the Serbian state administration. After Zaharija's flight, the Bulgars called on the Serbian župani to accept Časlav as the archon (μηνύσαντες τοῖς ζουπάνοις ἐλθεῖν πρὸς αὐτοὺς καὶ παραλαβεῖν ἄρχοντα τὸν Τζεέσθλαβον). This shows the political organization as the archon (or in Serbian, knez) had župani under him that needed to accept and recognize him, and perhaps took an oath of allegiance. The Bulgars however had no intention to appoint a new Serbian ruler, and used Časlav as a lure to capture the župani and Časlav and sent them to captivity in Bulgaria. Serbia was devastated and part of the people were enslaved and sent to Bulgaria, and some found refuge in Croatia. Serbia came under nominal Bulgarian rule, and was not integrated into the territorial system nor militarily or administratively occupied. As Simeon's policy in supporting candidates in Serbia had failed previously, he simply subjected Serbia without appointing Časlav, perhaps partially motivated by the strained relations with Croatia. The Bulgar cause of next attacking Croatia was possibly due to it being the safe haven of the exiled Serbian ruler and part of the population, and also as a counter-measure to a potential Byzantine–Croatian alliance. It perhaps simply was meant to pursue Zaharija and the remnant of his army. In 926 or 927, the Bulgarian army invaded and was completely destroyed in Croatia.

== Reign ==
Časlav fled Bulgaria with "four followers", likely Serbian župani captured in the earlier Bulgar devastation, and took the Serbian throne without the consent of the Bulgar ruler (suggesting participation in the anti-Bulgarian camp), and was helped by Byzantine emperor Romanos who also collected Serbian refugees and transferred them to Serbia. Časlav sent letters to Romanos, portraying Serbia as devastated, and asking for support and swearing loyalty, as his predecessors. Časlav recognized the supreme rule of Romanos and was recognized as archon of Serbia (καὶ ἄρχων ἐν αὐτῇ βεβαιωθείς). As such, he held the precedence in all of the Serbian principalities. Časlav thus returned to his fatherland where he had not lived, except for a short stay during the campaign against Zaharije. The DAI tells that Časlav "organized and settled the country", thanks to his wise politics and help from Romanos. Romanos is described as making "numerous good deeds" to Časlav, most likely meaning that there were many letters and decisions between them, and that it lasted a certain time. As Serbia had been simply devastated by the Bulgars, and not occupied, Časlav's initial tasks were to settle in as ruler and populate it.

The dating of Časlav's accession has been variously interpreted, but is most recently concluded to have been in 927/928. Beginning his rule in 927/928, following the death of Simeon (27 May 927), meant he used that as an opportunity and it goes in line with the events. Other sources record that "after learning of Simeon's death, the surrounding peoples, Croats, Turks [Magyars] and others (οἵ τε Χρωβάτοι οἱ Τοῦρκοι καὶ οἱ λοιποί) decided to war against the Bulgars", and Bulgaria was caught in a great famine and various plagues struck. Simeon's successor Peter I (r. 927–969) was thus forced to sign peace with Romanos, and on 10 October 927 it was finalized with the marriage of Peter I with Romanos' granddaughter. The Byzantine–Bulgarian peace of 927 gave way to strengthening of Byzantine influence in the Central Balkans, which is evident also from archaeological material, and it is in these circumstances that Časlav found himself. One of the results of the peace certainly was the establishment of relations between Časlav and Romanos. During the reign of Peter I, Byzantine–Bulgarian relations were positive, and Peter I was recognized by Byzantium; T. Živković positioned Časlav's accession as a possible joint Byzantine–Bulgarian political decision, with the agreement to not enthrone any other candidate. The support for Časlav from Romanos points to an Imperial plan to elevate and strengthen Serbia, as a result of the threats north of the Danube and Sava from the warlike Magyars.

In light of the Magyar threat to Byzantium and Bulgaria, Časlav as a Byzantine ally would have the role of defending the area south of the Sava and Danube, and he might also have fallen in battle; in fighting the Magyars, Časlav would have been supported by both Byzantium and Bulgaria. It is known that the Magyars raided Byzantine territory in 933 and again in 943. For a decade, the Magyars did not raid south of the Danube and Sava, and perhaps, Časlav was the cause of stopping those operations. T. Živković (who dated Časlav accession to 933/934), puts his reign in the context of the Magyar raids on Byzantium, and believed Časlav was chosen to deal with them on the initiative of Byzantium. Časlav could have been alive during the 943 Magyar incursion, and failed to stop it.

All the data on Časlav are connected to the reign of Romanos, and as such, in all probability, were recorded prior to Romanos' ousting in December 944. T. Živković deemed it certain that Časlav was deceased in 944, when Constantine VII succeeded as senior emperor, as he did not mention Časlav as his contemporary or benefactor. The DAI mentions Časlav as obeying Romanos, and make no explicit mention of this regarding Constantine VII who compiled the DAI itself and succeeded the throne in January 945. Časlav is taken either to have died in 943/944, or at an unknown date.

== Legendary Magyar-Serbian conflict ==
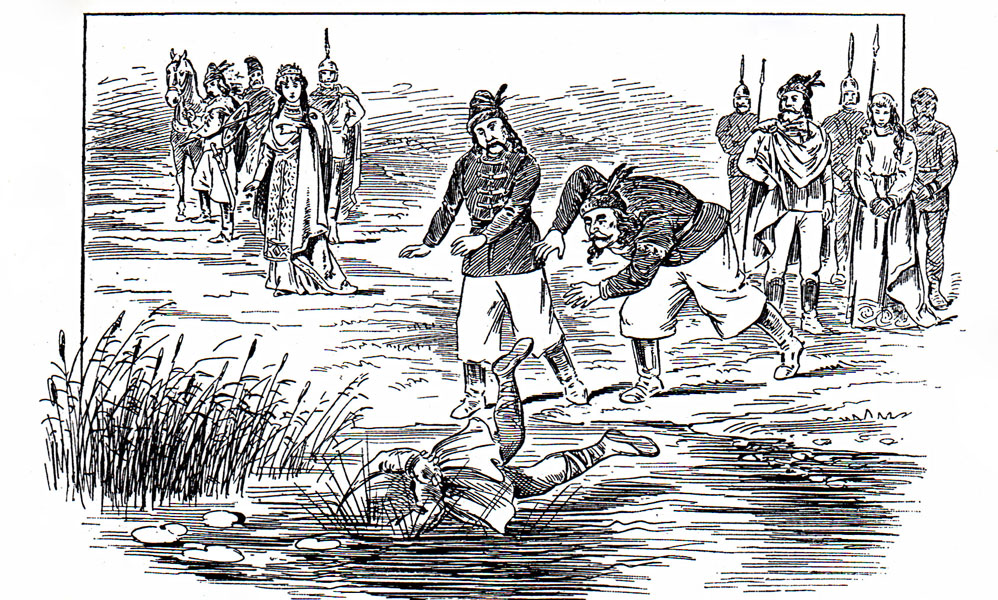
Časlav thrown into the Sava by the Magyars (19th century engraving).

There is a legend in the later Chronicle of the Priest of Duklja (LPD) regarding a Magyar-Serbian conflict in which a Serbian ruler named Časlav participated. The LPD is deemed an unreliable source for the early Middle ages, with accounts based on folklore, and with gross chronological and genealogical inconsistencies, the personal names, however, tend to be true. It mentions the ruler Časlav, portrayed as a very significant ruler, who together with "his father king Radoslav" (found in the DAI as an earlier ruler) successfully fought with "White Croatia" (that is, west Croatia) and then ousted his father. Next, Magyar chieftain Kys (Serbian: Kiša) raided and devastated Bosnia (which was an integral part of Serbia) and clashed with Časlav in the Drina župa (county), next to the river, at the location of Civedino (identified as Cvilin in the upper Drina near Foča) where Kys fell. For distinction, Časlav gave Tihomil, who slew Kys, the administration of Drina and wed him with the daughter of the ban of "Raška". Kys' widow was then given troops by the Magyar king to avenge him, and entered Syrmia (identified as Mačva) where Časlav was captured and thrown bound by the hands and feet into the Sava river. Historiography mostly agrees that DAI's Časlav and LPD's Časlav are one and the same, and analysis of the events point to the mid-10th century.

In the Gesta Hungarorum, there is a story that the Hungarians subjugated the land of Raška (Serbia) at the time of Árpád (r. c.895–c.907), and for long held the Serbian ruler imprisoned in chains (Latin: ...et ducem eius captum diu ferro ligatum tenuerunt...); while this points to the Serbian ruler Petar (r. 892–917/918), the author's tendency to attribute Pannonian operations to Árpád's time and the fact that Petar had friendly relations with the Magyars, it is more likely that the ruler in question is Časlav, who is also similarly described in LPD (Latin: ...et captus est rex Ciaslavus et omnes parentes illius... ligatis manibus et pedibus...). This shows there was a tradition of a Magyar-Serbian conflict, which received literary expression following two centuries.

== Polity ==
After DAI's account on Časlav, Serbia is presented as an organized territorial unit with "inhabited cities" (Greek: ...ἐν τῇ βαπτισμένῃ Σερβλίᾳ εἰσιν κάστρα οἰκούμενα...). The description is made of Serbia at the time of Constantine VII, while the history of "baptized Serbia" in chapter 32 implies a wider Serbia. It is unclear what territorial changes Serbia went through, but the DAI speaks of Serb tribes in south Dalmatia, "baptized Serbia", and Simeon's attack on "today's Serbia". At the time of the DAI, the political organization was not determined on territory, but on people (gens or "tribe"). The DAI usually used the title "archon of Serbia" (ὁ ἄρχων Σερβλίας), while De Ceremoniis (946) used "archon of Serbs" (εἰς τὸν ἄρχοντα Σέρβλων); these were likely synonyms.

=== Geography ===
The DAI enumerates "inhabited cities" of "baptized Serbia": Drstnik, Crnovrški, Međurečje, Drežnik, Lešnik, Sol, and in the area of Bosnia, Kotor and Desnik. The first city, Destinikon/Dostinika (Greek: Δεστινίκον/Δοστινίκα) in original Greek, is identified as Drsnik in Hvosno, later mentioned (Дрьстьникь) by Stefan Nemanjić, and which has remains of an early medieval fortification. Drstnik was a political center, or the capital. The second, Tzernavouskei (Τζερναβουσκέη), is *Črьnov(r)ь(šь)skь in Slavic, that is Crni Vrh ("black peak") which is widespread in Serbia as a site with fortification, and perhaps is the župa of Crna Stena in the Prijepolje area. Megyretous (Μεγυρέτους) is Slavic međurečje ("between rivers") and signifies a city at the confluence of two rivers, perhaps Piva and Tara, where the later Soko fortress was founded, or somewhere else in the Drina zemlja. Dresneik (Δρεσνεήκ; Slavic *Drěžьnikъ) and Lesnik (Λεσνήκ; Slavic *Lěš(čь)nikъ) are common toponyms and their location is therefore hard to determine. S. Mišić (2014) connects Lesnik to Lešnica in Jadar or below Vidojevica, and Dresneik to Drežnik in the Užice area or Pljevlja area. Salines (Σαλινές) is medieval Sol, modern-day Tuzla. The DAI is the oldest mention of Bosnia (εἰς τὸ χωρίον Βόσονα), and the Bosnia region was part of Serbia also prior to its mention in DAI. There is no mention of an archon of Bosnia in De Ceremoniis. The claim by some Croatian and Bosnian historians that Bosnia was part of Croatia is not based on any historical source. The Bosnia mentioned at the time did not include all Serbian territory to the west of the Drina, because Sol, likely with the wider area of later Usora and Soli between Drina, Sava and Vrbas, did not belong to it. The horion ("little land") of Bosnia included the upper and middle course of the eponymous Bosna river. The Drina was certainly the border between Serbia and Bosnia by the late 13th century, but it was not the definite border prior to this, and LPD's division of Serbia into Raška and Bosnia dates from this period. Katera (τὸ Κάτερα; Slavic Kotorъ) could be identified as Kotorac overlooking the Sarajevo field, while Desnik (Δεσνήκ; Slavic *těsnikъ) could be the later Sutjeska.

Serbia proper bordered in the west with Croatia towards Cetina and Livno; Imotski and Pliva (around the Pliva river) are mentioned as župe (counties) part of Croatia, while in the northwest the župe of Lika, Krbava and Gatzka were under the administration of the Croatian ban. This meant that Serbia included the Vrbas valley in the west, and the northwestern border began at the Vrbas mouth into Sava. From southeast to northwest, to the upper Cetina, the Serbian–Croatian border went Vran–Ljubuša–Vitorog–Cincar. Towards the Adriatic sea, the Dalmatian principalities, from northwest-southeast direction, were Narentines (between Cetina and Neretva), Zahumlje (from Neretva to Dubrovnik), Travunija (from Dubrovnik to Kotor), and Duklja (from Kotor towards Dyrrachion), which all bordered Serbia proper in the mountains. In the north, based on the Magyar territory, Časlav's conflict, and Salines (Tuzla) explicitly included in Serbia, the territory stretched to the Sava and towards the Danube. The northern border followed the Sava from Vrbas to before Belgrade, and still in the 11th century Kekaumenos (c. 1078) mentions Serbs living by the river in "inaccessible places". In the east, Serbia bordered with Bulgaria and the Ras fortress was described as a frontier in DAI. The eastern frontier stretched over the Ibar valley, crossed West Morava and through the Kolubara valley approached the Sava river. The DAI mentions Travunija as "always under the rule of the archon of Serbia", and an apparent contemporary to Časlav was Tuđimir who ruled Travunija with Konavli. Zahumlje and Travunija are both called horion, and not hora as Serbia and Croatia. Zahumlje was independently ruled by dux Michael (fl. 912–927), who had allied with Bulgaria against Petar Gojniković; his activity regarding Serbian affairs between 917 and 927 is unknown, but it is certain that after the Croatian-Bulgarian battle or Simeon's death (927), he became a Byzantine ally, and he might have died by 935. At the time of the writing of the DAI, the Narentines were not subject to Serbia.

=== Religion ===
Christianity had more or less taken root among the Serbs by the latter half of the 9th century, from when the earliest Christian-named rulers are mentioned. There are archaeological findings of church buildings dated to the 8th and 9th centuries. By the time of Basil I, there were missionaries from Rome that Christianized the Serbian population. Through the Diocese of Pannonia under Methodios, the Roman church had sought to restore its influence in Illyricum. At that time, there was a Byzantine–Roman struggle of church influence in the Balkans, Great Moravia and southern Russia. The Byzantine church came to prevail in Serbia and Bulgaria. With the autocephaly of the Bulgarian church in 880, the metropolitanates in Bulgarian territory, up to then organized into the Constantinopolitan Patriarchate, became part of the Bulgarian church, including those of the Morava Valley and Raška. The imperial charter of Basil II from 1020 to the Archbishopric of Ohrid mentions the bishopric of Ras as among the bishoprics "belonging to the provinces of Bulgarian archbishops at the time of Peter and Samuilo", meaning Ras was included in the Bulgarian church at latest by the time of Peter (927–969). It is believed Časlav had firm religious relation with Bulgaria, thanks to which Byzantine–Slavic culture and literature was developed by Cyril and Methodius.

== Aftermath ==
The information on Serbia as a political entity in the 10th century ends with De Administrando Imperio and Serbian ruler Časlav, and there are no contemporary information on affairs in the Serbian state among Byzantine authors until the mid-11th century. Up until the mid-10th century, Byzantium focused on the East, which is why literary focus intensified only in the late 10th- and early 11th centuries with the northern campaigns to the Danube. In the book of ceremonial protocol De Ceremoniis (946), the Serbian archon is listed among rulers whom the emperors send their "commandment" (Greek: κέλευσις), as their "Christ-loving lords". From the LPD it seems that Serbia disintegrated with infighting among the nobility. According to T. Živković, it also seems that Bosnia began to separate as a political unit. Bulgaria was conquered in 971 and the Byzantine empire now again stretched to the Danube. The Byzantines established control over Ras, evident in the survived seal of protospatharios and katepano John of Ras. The LPD claims that after the death of Byzantine emperor John I Tzimiskes (976), there was a rebellion instigated by the ruler of Duklja, after which "all of Rascia" (Serbia) came under his rule. There was a Bulgarian uprising in the following decade led by the Kometopouloi brothers that led to the control of vast territory of the former Bulgarian empire, spreading to the Danube banks, including the region of Morava and Braničevo. It is probable that after the Kometopouloi rebellion, the ruler of Duklja took the opportunity to expand into Serbia in the hinterland.

Serbian deputies to the Byzantine emperor (Greek: σέρβους κρατηθήναι) are mentioned in an Athonite charter dated 993. The seal of Peter, komistes (guardian) and archon of Serbia dating to the beginning of the 11th century, speaks of an hitherto unknown Byzantine vassal and Serbian ruler, prior to the officials (patrikios, vestarches, protospatharios, strategos) of the theme of Serbia in the 11th century. Until 1016, Duklja and parts of the Serbian hinterland were ruled by Jovan Vladimir, as Skylitzes mentions him "governing Triballia and neighbouring regions of Serbia" ("Τριβαλίας καὶ τῶν ἀγχοτάτω Σερβίας μερῶν ἦρχε Βλαδιμιρός").

== Legacy ==
Stevan Sremac (1855–1906) authored the historic novel series Iz knjiga starostavnih, which includes the Vlastimirović dynasty (and Časlav) as characters. Sremac authored Veliki župan Časlav in 1903. Petar J. Vasić wrote an epic poem about Časlav included in the collection Pesme o srpskim junacima ("Songs about Serb heroes", 1988).

There are many streets named after him, such as in Savski Venac, Borča, Guncati, Mladenovac, Mala Vranjska, Šabac, Babina Luka, Sinošević, Vinorača, Užice, Parunovac, Mramorski Potok.

== See also ==
- List of Serbian monarchs

== Annotations ==
1. The name Časlav (Часлав) is Slavic. It is rendered Greek: Τζεέσθλαβος (transliterated as Tzeésthlabos) in DAI. It is dithematic, either *Čьstьslavъ (čast and slava, "honor and glory"), or *Čějeslavъ ("he who awaits glory"). He was a son of Klonimir and is thus also called Časlav Klonimirović (Часлав Клонимировић) in historiography.
2. Doubting DAI's account which highlights Byzantium's role, M. Leszka put forward another hypothesis, that Časlav perhaps was reinstated by Bulgaria, as a Serbian prince potentially dangerous to Bulgarian interest would have been adequately guarded, and with the Byzantine-Bulgarian alliance and neutralization of Croatian threat, his accession would be favourable to both Byzantine and Bulgarian interest. Another hypothesis is that judging by the DAI's inclination to portray Serbia as a Byzantine subject, and Constantine VII's negative view on the 927 peace, the fate of the Serbs between Časlav and the writing of the DAI could have been omitted as it was in contrast with Byzantine overlordship. However, Leszka concludes, the sudden end of the narrative in DAI's chapter 32 could have been unintentional and simply left unfinished as the vast majority of chapters.
3. The dating of Časlav's accession was noted as having been not quite settled in historiography, depending on the starting point event of "seven years". It was either interpreted as seven years following Zaharija's bid for power (920/921), meaning 927/928, or seven years from the Bulgarian subjugation and Časlav's imprisonment (dated between 924 and 926). Bulgarian historians recently dated the escape to 928 and Byzantium's aid to 931. T. Živković put his accession seven years after the Bulgarian campaign in Croatia which he dated to 926, that is, in 933/934, and based it in the context of Magyar attacks that year, and this dating is refuted by P. Komatina. M. Leszka dated the Bulgarian subjugation to 924 and Časlav's departure to 931. Older Yugoslav historiography tended to date it in the years of 931–934. Already G. Ostrogorsky noted the use of a chronological determinant to begin a section dedicated to the new ruler; Zaharija's ousting of Pavle "after three years" meant three years after Pavle's succession, Časlav's coming to rule Serbia "after seven years" meant seven years after Zaharija's succession. As Zaharija's rule began in 921, this would mean 927/928 in the case of Časlav. P. Komatina deems it impossible to date Časlav's accession based on the Bulgarian invasion; the previous sentence of the chronological determinant is the Bulgarian invasion of Croatia, which has the purpose to determine the time of the previous, Bulgarian campaign against Zaharija–in the same way Achelous determined the time of talks between Petar and the strategos of Dyrrachion. The death of Simeon (27 May 927) meant he used that as an opportunity and it goes in line with the events, as per P. Komatina.
4. Some Bulgarian historians earlier theorized that the conflict was a consequence of the Byzantine–Serbian alliance against a Bulgarian–Hungarian alliance, however, at least until the early 940s the Magyars threatened both Byzantium and Bulgaria, and in fighting them, the Serbs were promoting both Byzantine and Bulgarian interest.

== Sources ==
- Komatina, Ivana (2023). "Културна кретања у српско-угарским односима у XIII веку" [Cultural tendencies in the Serbian-Hungarian relations in the 13th century: The Legend of St. Ladislaus and The Life of St. Sava.]. Зборник радова Византолошког института. 60 (2). Византолошки институт, Београд: 979–996. ISSN 2406-0917.
- Komatina, Predrag (2021). Константин Порфирогенит и рана историја Јужних Словена [Constantine Porphyrogenitus and the Early History of South Slavs]. Византолошки институт, Београд. ISBN 978-86-83883-28-8.
- Komatina, Ivana (2016a). Црква и држава у српским земљама од XI до XIII века [Church and State in the Serbian Lands from the XIth to the XIIIth Century]. Београд: Institute of History. ISBN 9788677431136.
- Komatina, Predrag (2016b). "Military, administrative and religious strongholds on the Danubian frontier". Byzantine Heritage and Serbian Art. I: 103–108 – via Academia.edu.
- Komatina, Predrag (2015). "О српско-бугарској граници у IX и X веку". Зборник радова Византолошког института. 52: 31–42. ISSN 2406-0917.
- Komatina, Predrag (2012). "Србија и Дукља у делу Јована Скилице" [Serbia and Dioclea in the work of John Scylitzes]. Зборник радова Византолошког института (49). National Library of Serbia: 159–186. doi:10.2298/zrvi1249159k. ISSN 0584-9888.
- Leszka, Mirosław J.; Marinow, Kirił (2018). "Foreign Policy". The Bulgarian State in 927–969: The Epoch of Tsar Peter I. Byzantina Lodziensia XXXIV. Jagiellonian University Press. doi:10.18778/8142-115-7.
- Mišić, Siniša (2014). Историјска географија српских земаља: од 6. до половине 16. века. Магелан Прес. ISBN 978-86-88873-17-8.
- Mišić, Siniša (2022). Историјска географија српских земаља (VI – XVI век) (2nd ed.). Народни музеј Пожаревац; Центар за историјску географију и историјску демографију Филозофског факултета Универзитета у Београду. ISBN 978-86-84147-59-4.
- Novaković, Bojan (2016). "Zemlje Dalmatinskih slovena [Lands of the Dalmatian Slavs]". In Rudić, Srđan (ed.). Spomenica dr Tibora Živkovića [Homage to Tibor Živković]. Istorijski institut. pp. 129-. ISBN 978-86-7743-117-4.
- Pavlović, Bojana (2025). "The Balkans between Byzantium and Bulgaria". In Krsmanović, Bojana (ed.). Barbarians, Rhomaioi and those in between: integrating the Christians of the Central Balkans into the Byzantine Empire (late 10th–mid-13th Century). Vol. 1. Institute for Byzantine Studies. doi:10.46793/barb.rhom.i.007p. ISBN 978-86-83883-29-5.
- Uzelac, Aleksandar (2018). "Prince Michael of Zahumlje – a Serbian ally of tsar Symeon". In Nikolov, Angel; Kanev, Nikolay (eds.). Emperor Symeon's Bulgaria in the History of Europe's South-East: 1100 years from the Battle of Achelous. St Kliment Ohridski University Press, Sofia. pp. 236–245 – via Academia.edu.
- Živković, Tibor (2006). Портрети српских владара: IX-XII век [Portraits of Serbian Rulers: IX-XII century]. Завод за уџбенике и наставна средства, Београд. ISBN 9788617137548.
- Živković, Tibor (2008). Forging unity: The South Slavs between East and West 550-1150. Belgrade: The Institute of History, Čigoja štampa. ISBN 978-86-7558-573-2.
- Živković, Tibor (2009). Gesta Regum Sclavorum. Vol. 2. Београд-Никшић: Историјски институт, Манастир Острог.
- Živković, Tibor (2012). "О такозваној „Хроници српских владара" из списа „De administrando imperio" цара Константина VII Порфирогенита". Византијски свет на Балкану. II. Византолошки институт САНУ: 313–332.

Časlav Vlastimirović dynasty Born: 870s Died: possibly 943/944
Regnal titles
Preceded by Zaharija	Prince of Serbia; 927/928 to possibly 943/944	Vacant Title next held by Jovan Vladimir as Prince of Serbs and Duklja (c. 1000)
Titles in pretence
Preceded by Zaharija as Prince of Serbia	— TITULAR — Prince of Serbia; 924 or 925/926–927/928; Reason for succession failure: Imprisonment in Bulgaria	Succession
