= Foča (Federation of Bosnia and Herzegovina) =

Municipality in Bosnia and Herzegovina

Coordinates: 43.584°N 18.793°E

Foča Фоча
- Municipality
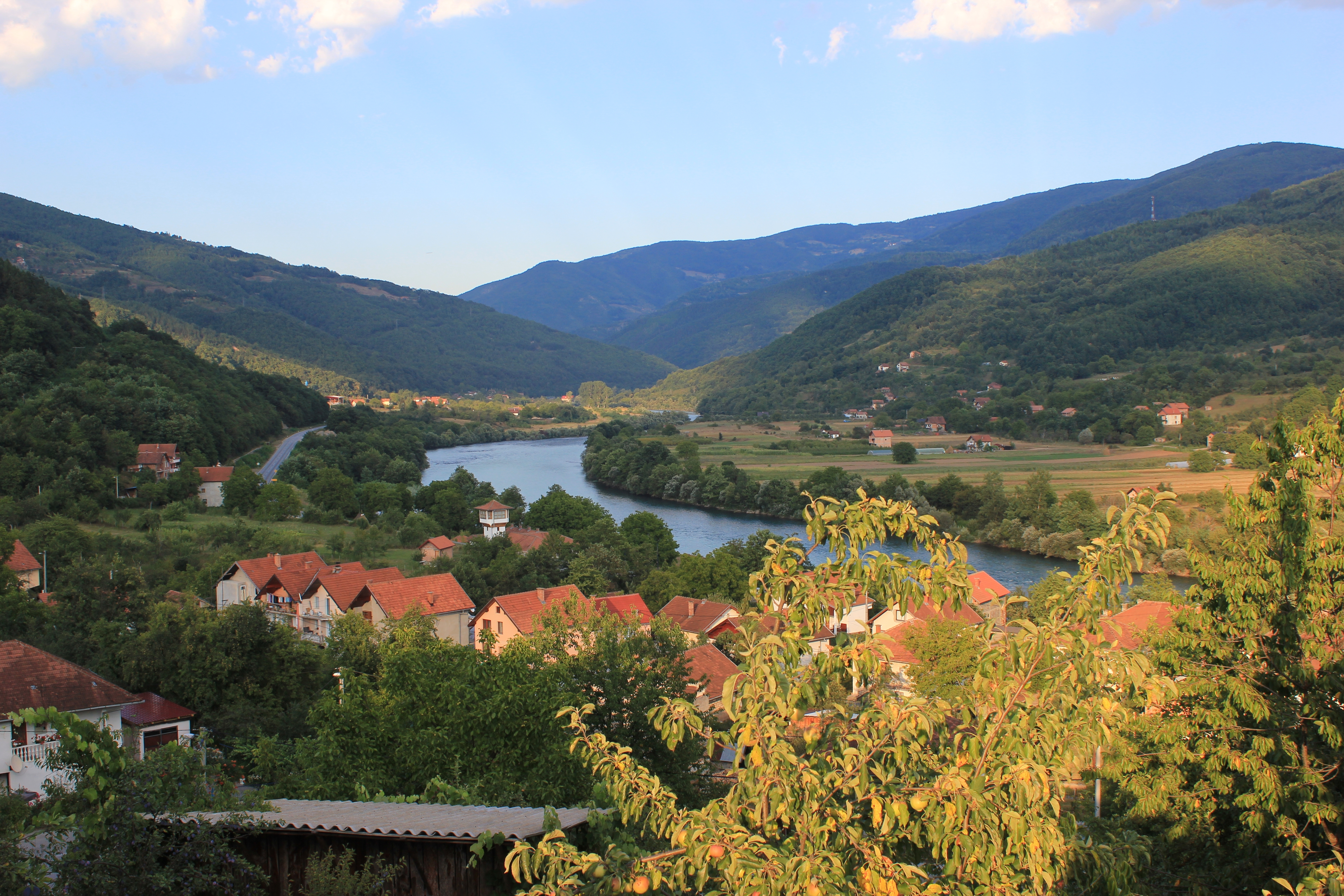
- Ustikolina

- Location of Foča within Bosnia and Herzegovina
- Country: Bosnia and Herzegovina
- Entity: Federation of Bosnia and Herzegovina
- Canton: Bosnian-Podrinje Canton
- Geographical region: Podrinje

Government
  - Municipality president: Mujo Sofradžija (Ind.)

Area
  - Total: 169.4 km^{2} (65.4 sq mi)

Population (2013 census)
  - Total: 1,933
  - Density: 11.4/km^{2} (30/sq mi)
- Time zone: UTC+1 (CET)
  - Summer (DST): UTC+2 (CEST)
- Area code: +387 38

Foča (Serbian Cyrillic: Фоча) is a municipality located in Bosnian-Podrinje Canton Goražde of the Federation of Bosnia and Herzegovina, an entity of Bosnia and Herzegovina. The seat of the municipality is the village of Ustikolina.

Foča (FBiH) comprises the Northern area of the pre-war Foča Municipality, covering 13.1% of the territory of the pre-war areas of the Foča Municipality. The village of Dragomilići, which was part of the Municipality of Kalinovik until the Dayton Agreement became a part of the Foča Municipality in FBiH.

During the Bosnian War, the Bosniak population of Foča was massacred, villages were burned and destroyed, mosques were destroyed and the surviving Bosniak population was forced to flee towards Sarajevo, Jablanica, Zenica and Goražde. This is known as the Foča ethnic cleansing.

== Demographics ==
=== Ethnic composition ===
Ethnic composition – Foča municipality
	2013.		1991.	
Total	1,933	100%	5,158 (100,0%)	100,0%
Bosniaks	1,762	91.3%	3,632 (70.4%)	70.4%
Serbs	145	7.5%	1,457 (28.2%)	28.2%
Montenegrins	1	<0.01%		
Slovenes	1	<0.01%		
Croats	0	0%	1	<0.01%
Others	26	1.3%	68	1.3%

Population and ethnic compositions of settlements of the Foča municipality (FBiH) 2013 census
Settlement	Total	Bosniaks	%	Serbs	%	Others	%
Bavčići	38	38	100%	0	0%	0	0%
Bešlići	11	11	100%	0	0%	0	0%
Borovinići (FBiH)	0	0	0%	0	0%	0	0%
Brajići (FBiH)	13	0	0%	13	0%	0	0%
Bujakovina (FBiH)	0	0	0%	0	0%	0	0%
Bunčići	3	1	33.3%	2	66.7%	0	0%
Cvilin (FBiH)	230	226	98.3%	2	0.9%	2	0.9%
Donje Žešće	13	1	7.7%	12	92.3%	0	0%
Dragomilići	2	2	100%	0%	0%	0%	0%
Filipovići (FBiH)	86	83	96.5%	3	3.5%	0	0%
Glušca (FBiH)	0	0	0%	0	0%	0	0%
Gostičaj	4	4	100%	0	0%	0	0%
Jabuka	88	88	100%	0	0%	0	0%
Kolakovići	0	0	0%	0	0%	0	0%
Kolun (FBiH)	0	0	0%	0	0%	0	0%
Lokve	79	78	98.7%	1	1.3%	0	0%
Marevo (FBiH)	0	0	0%	0	0%	0	0%
Mazlina	30	30	100%	0	0%	0	0%
Mravljača	4	0	0%	4	100%	0	0%
Njuhe	110	109	99.1%	1	0.9%	0	0%
Petojevići	23	23	100%	0	0%	0	0%
Podgrađe	4	0	0%	4	100%	0	0%
Previla	5	5	100%	0	0%	0	0%
Prisoje (FBiH)	13	11	84.6%	2	15.4%	0	0%
Račići	2	0	0%	2	100%	0	0%
Rodijelj (FBiH)	13	13	100%	0	0%	0	0%
Stavičići	4	4	100%	0	0%	0	0%
Sorlaci (FBiH)	0	0	0%	0	0%	0	0%
Ustikolina	882	760	86.2%	99	11.2%	23	2.6%
Zabor	17	17	100%	0	0%	0	0%
Zebina Šuma	257	256	99.6%	0	0%	1	0.4%
Foča Municipal total	1,933	1,762	91.2%	145	7.5%	26	1.3%

== Gallery ==
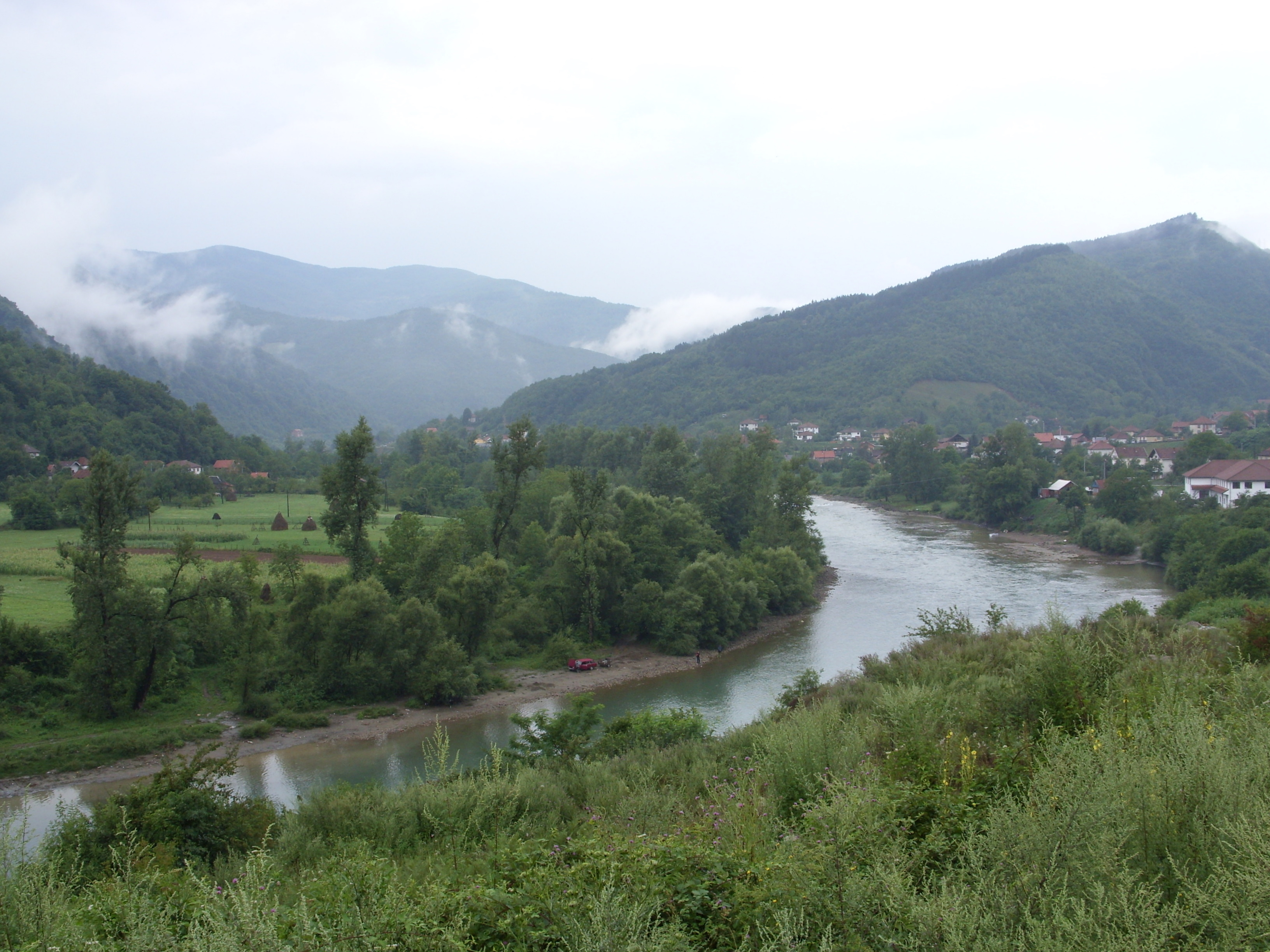
The Drina River in Ustikolina

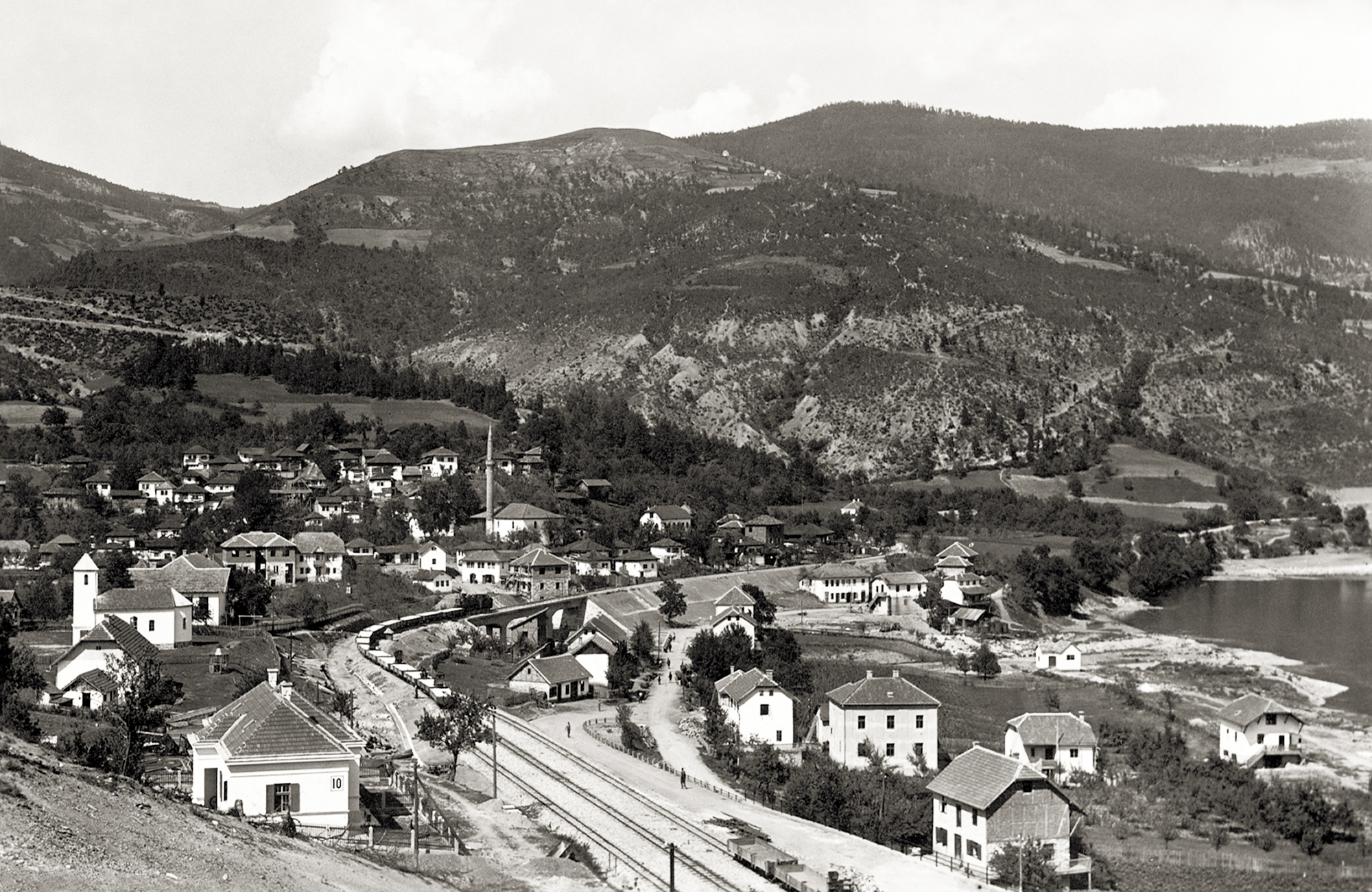
The train station of Ustikolina in 1939

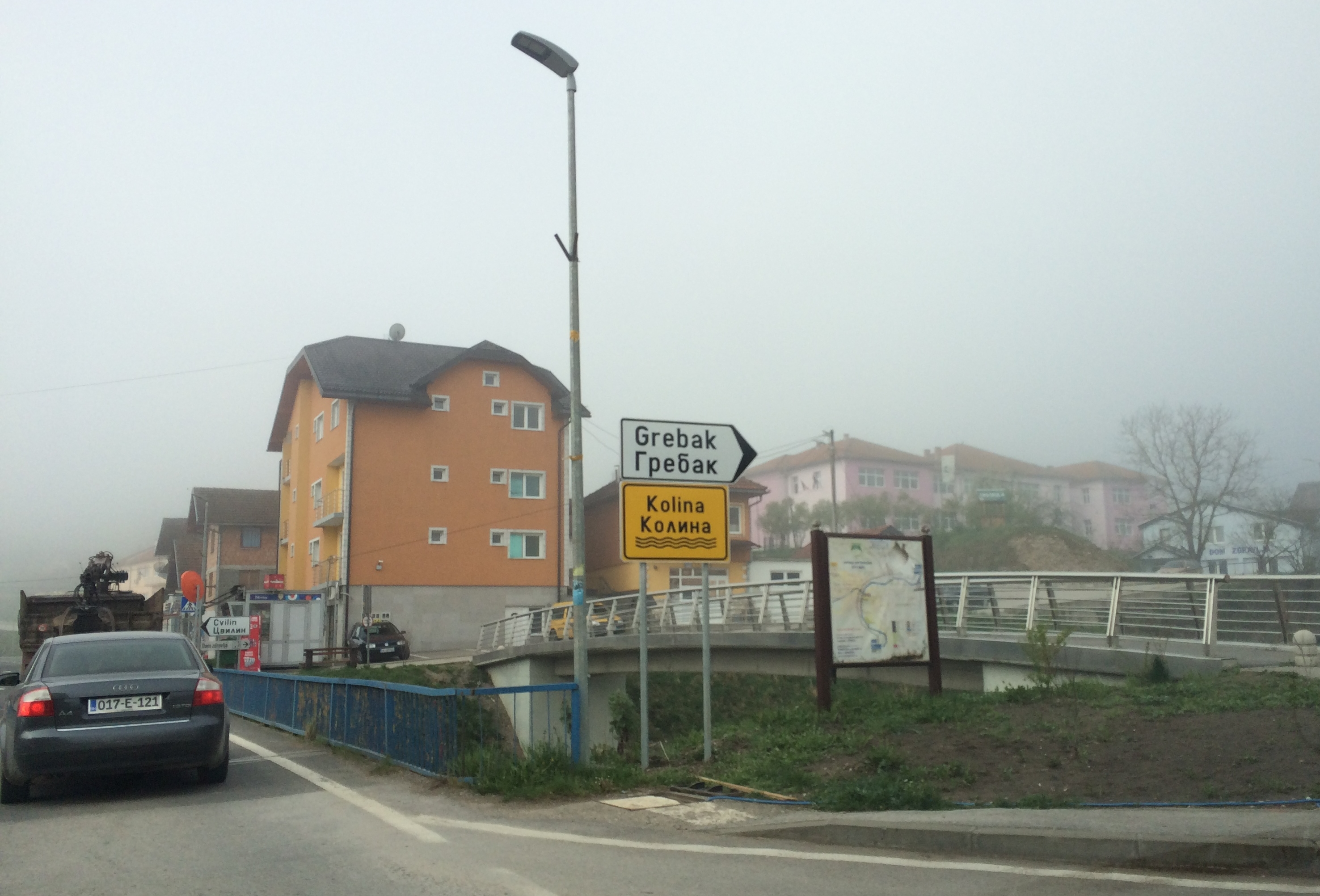
Urban area of Ustikolina, 2015

== See also ==
- Bosnian Podrinje Canton
