= Dimitrije (veliki čelnik) =

Serbian magnate from 14th century

- veliki čelnik ("great čelnik", equivalent of comes palatinus)
- Born: turn of 14th century
- Died: 6 March 1349
- Occupation: Serbian royal official; governor of Gacko, Rudine, Drina and Dabar

Dimitrije (Serbian Cyrillic: Димитрије; died 6 March 1349) was a Serbian magnate who served emperor Stefan Dušan (r. 1331–55) as veliki čelnik ("great čelnik"). As a royal čelnik, the title-holder had a very high position at the Serbian court, often compared to comes palatinus. The veliki čelnik supervised over several čelniks, the čelnik being a commander of military fortifications (and presumably its troops) or a senior (starešina) of a larger number of villages. Dimitrije entered the service of Stefan Dušan before 1349, when he was mentioned with the title of veliki čelnik. Earlier, magnate Jovan Oliver had the title (fl. 1340). Dimitrije died on 6 March 1349 and was buried at the Monastery of St. Nicholas at Banja. According to the grave inscription, Dimitrije had held Gacko with Rudine, Drina and Dabar. G. Tomović theorized that this Dimitrije was the same person as the earlier mentioned nobleman Hrvatin (magnate Vojin's brother) who served King Stefan Dečanski (r. 1322–31) and held Rudine (1330). In 1350, Đurica and Andronik are mentioned as čelniks. After Jovan Oliver and Dimitrije, it seems that the title of veliki čelnik was not given at the Serbian Imperial court. The territories held by Dimitrije were eventually consolidated by Vojin's son Vojislav (fl. 1350–d. 1363). It was earlier believed that Dimitrije died in 1359.

== Sources ==
- Blagojević, Miloš (2001). Državna uprava u srpskim srednjovekovnim zemljama. Službeni list SRJ. ISBN 9788635504971.
- Tomović, Gordana (2011). Rudić, Srđan (ed.). "Vojinovići". Споменица академика Симе Ћирковића [Homage to Academician Sima Ćirković]. Istorijski institut: 355–366. ISBN 978-86-7743-091-7.
- SKA (1908). Glas. Vol. 78–80. SKA. p. 196.

Court offices
| Preceded by Jovan Oliver | veliki čelnik of Stefan Dušan after 1340–1349 | Dormant |
