= Regions of Bosnia and Herzegovina =

Bosnia and Herzegovina, like many countries, is made of geographical, historical, and political regions. The current geopolitical regions were finalised with the signing of the Dayton Agreement.

== Geographical regions ==
Bosnia (Bosna)

- Bosanska Krajina / Western Bosnia
- Bosanska Posavina (Bosnian Sava river basin)
- Semberija
- Podrinje / Eastern Bosnia (Bosnian Drina river basin)
- Srednja Bosna / Central Bosnia
- Tropolje

Herzegovina (Hercegovina)

- West Herzegovina
- Herzegovina-Neretva Canton
- East Herzegovina

== Historical regions ==
Historical regions

Bosnia in the Middle Ages spanning the Banate of Bosnia and the succeeding Kingdom of Bosnia

- Bosnia
  - Birač
  - Srednja Bosna
  - Vrhbosna
  - Osat
- Bosanska Krajina
  - Cazinska Krajina
  - Knešpolje
  - Lijevče
- Donji Kraji
- Tropolje
- Herzegovina
- Travunija

=== Medieval counties ===
- Dabar
- Drina
- Popovo
- Soli
- Usora
- Vrhbosna
- Vrm
- Zagorje, (Parish)

== Urban regions ==
- Sarajevo
  - Goražde
  - Visoko
- Banjaluka
  - Prijedor
  - Bihać
- Mostar
  - Trebinje
  - Livno
- Tuzla
  - Brčko
  - Bijeljina
- Zenica
  - Doboj
  - Travnik

== Political regions ==
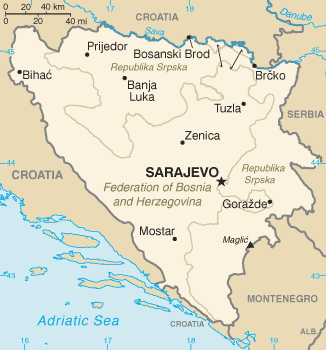
Bosnia and Herzegovina after the Dayton Agreement

- Federation of Bosnia and Herzegovina (FBiH)
- Republika Srpska (RS)

== See also ==
- List of cities in Bosnia and Herzegovina
- Municipalities of Bosnia and Herzegovina
- Political divisions of Bosnia and Herzegovina
