= Tihomil (legendary ruler) =

Serbian legendary ruler

Tihomil (Serbian: Тихомил, Latin: Tycomil) or Tihomir (Тихомир), is a legendary Serbian nobleman who was mentioned in the Chronicle of the Priest of Duklja as a contemporary and companion of "king Časlav of Raška", that is, Serbian ruler Časlav who is mentioned in De Administrando Imperio of emperor Constantine VII. The story mentions him rising from a shepherd to soldier, participating in a legendary Magyar-Serbian conflict, and being elevated to nobility and becoming a ruler. 15th-century Serbian chronicles name him an ancestor of the Nemanjić dynasty.

== Story ==
Tihomil is mentioned in the Chronicle of the Priest of Duklja (LPD), which is confirmed to have been compiled by archbishop Rudger of Bar (t. 1298–1301). The work includes earlier sources, such as the Hagiography of St. Jovan Vladimir, dedicated to the historical figure Jovan Vladimir, a Serbian ruler of Duklja at the end of the 10th- and beginning of 11th century. Overall, the accounts in the LPD has gross chronological and genealogical inconsistencies, while the personal names, however, tend to be true. The story of Tihomil is theorized to have been an independent, earlier work. V. Jagić, Nikola Radojčić, J. Kovačević (1967), all believed there was epic poetry dedicated to him, while Nikola Banašević (1971) believed that the story's parts were of various folk traditions, perhaps in epic poetry, but that a single epic poem about Tihomil did not exist. T. Živković treats the story about Tihomil as a legend, folktale, heroic poem, that was known from Split to Bar, and compiled by the author of LPD who filled it with biblical motives. Banašević treated Tihomil as an adaptation of king David of the Old Testament, and T. Živković supported and widened this view.

Tihomil was the son of a Byzantine Rite priest (as he could marry and have children) in the village of Rabika, in the Sraga province. The village is identified with Rabina in the surroundings of Nevesinje. Notably, most rulers mentioned by LPD do not have their birth places included. Travunija, neighbouring Nevesinje, was part of Serbia and is known to have had many churches built on older foundations. Tihomil was a shepherd that tended for a prince Budisav, who is not mentioned in any other sources. Tihomil is described as strong, fast, an able hunter, who accompanied Budisav in hunting. By mistake, he killed Budisav's dog Paluzija. The fact that the author wrote of his father's profession, his birth place and profession, and even name of a dog, shows that it was taken from an older literary work. As to save himself from repercussion, he fled to the court of "king Časlav of Raška" where he became a soldier.

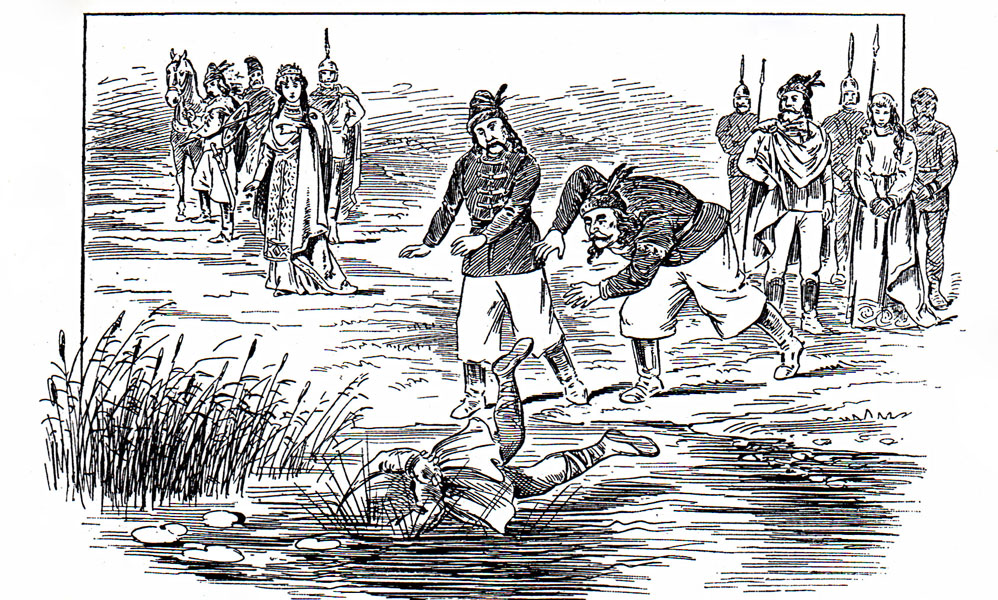
Časlav thrown into the Sava by the Magyars (19th century engraving).

The LPD mentions how Magyar chieftain Kys (Serbian: Kiša) raided and devastated Bosnia and that Časlav clashed with him in the Drina župa (county), next to the river, at the location of Civedino (identified as Cvilin in the upper Drina near Foča) where Kys fell, and the place was called Ciscovo at the time of the scribe. The region of Bosnia at the time was an integral part of Serbia. For distinction in the battle, Časlav gave Tihomil, who slew Kys, the administration of the Drina župa and wed him with the daughter of the ban of "Raška". In the meantime, Kys' widow was given troops by the Magyar king to avenge him and entered Syrmia where Časlav was captured and thrown bound by the hands and feet into the Sava river. Historiography mostly agrees that DAI's Časlav and LPD's Časlav are one and the same, and analysis of events point to the mid-10th century. Časlav would as a Byzantine ally had the role of defending the area south of the Sava and Danube, and he might also have fallen in battle. In the Gesta Hungarorum, there is a story that the Hungarians subjugated the land of Raška (Serbia) at the time of Árpád (r. c.895–c.907), and for long held the Serbian prince imprisoned in chains (Latin: ...et ducem eius captum diu ferro ligatum tenuerunt...); while this points to the Serbian ruler Petar (r. 892–917/918), the author's tendency to attribute Pannonian operations to Árpád's time and the fact that Petar had friendly relations with the Magyars, it is more likely that the prince in question is Časlav, who is also similarly described in LPD (Latin: ...et captus est rex Ciaslavus et omnes parentes illius... ligatis manibus et pedibus...). This points to that there was a tradition regarding a Magyar-Serbian conflict, which received literary expression following two centuries.

The LPD mentions that after the death of Časlav, and following another conflict with the Magyars, the royal title of king was removed and Serbia disintegrated and several ban came to rule over the župani. After the death of his father-in-law, the ban of Raška, Tihomil succeeded as ban but instead adopted the title veliki župan, and he is the earliest such in the LPD. Historians noted that the LPD used the example of Tihomil to explain the adoption of the title veliki župan in Serbia, which is known only from the late 11th century. The successors to the Serbian throne after Časlav are unknown. His rise is unique among the characters mentioned in the LPD, from shepherd to soldier, to nobleman and ruler. Tihomil's descendants continued to rule Raška. T. Živković noted that LPD's accounts of the second half of the 10th century are so meager that no reliable conclusions can be made, and it is in this time period Tihomil and his dynasty would have ruled.

Đ. Đekić believed the story of Tihomil to be based on an older literary work, which spoke of his humble origins, a priest's son, who rose to become a ruler. The original work did not, as the LPD, have information on his reign. It would have been written in the 12th century, and included a story basis from the 10th century, and in the 11th century his story was connected to that of Časlav. The LPD adopted the story from folk tradition which he collected in Split, regarding the ancestors of the Serbian Nemanjić dynasty. In the 15th century, the Serbian chronicles mention Tihomil/Tihomir as an ancestor of Stefan Nemanja, with slight variations.

== See also ==
- List of Serbian monarchs

== Sources ==
- Đekić, Đorđe (2019). "The Story of Tihomil: The Oldest Preserved Literary Work in Serbian Literature". Studia philologica. 38 (1). Veliko Tarnovo: 227–239. doi:10.54664/SBEF3719.
- Komatina, Ivana (2023). "Културна кретања у српско-угарским односима у XIII веку" [Cultural tendencies in the Serbian-Hungarian relations in the 13th century: The Legend of St. Ladislaus and The Life of St. Sava.]. Зборник радова Византолошког института. 60 (2). Византолошки институт, Београд: 979–996.
- Kunčer, Dragana (2009). Gesta Regum Sclavorum. Vol. 1. Beograd-Nikšić: Историјски институт, Манастир Острог.
- Živković, Tibor (2009). Gesta Regum Sclavorum. Vol. 2. Београд-Никшић: Историјски институт, Манастир Острог.
- Živković, Tibor (2006). Портрети српских владара: IX-XII век [Portraits of Serbian Rulers: IX-XII century]. Завод за уџбенике и наставна средства, Београд. ISBN 9788617137548.
