= Drina (župa) =

Coordinates: 44.1920514°N 19.385376°E

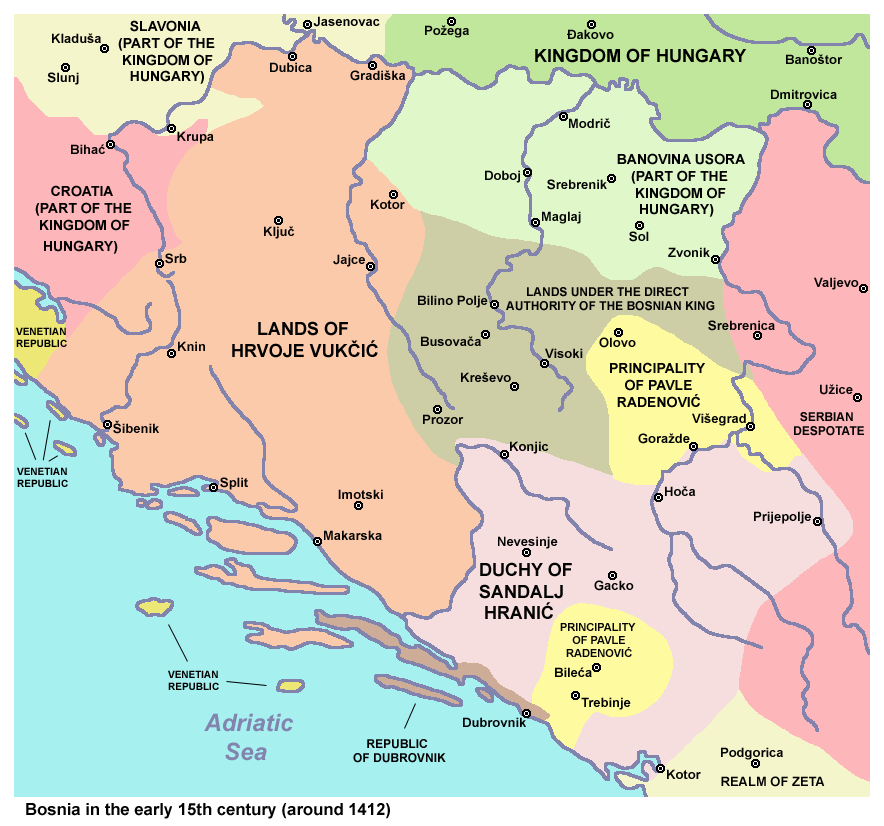
Bosnia around 1412

Drina (Serbian Cyrillic: Дрина, pronounced [drǐːna]) was a medieval župa (parish), and later zemlja, located in what is now Podrinje, the region in the Drina river valley, shared by (eastern) Bosnia and Herzegovina and (western) Serbia. Its location and spreading is unclear, although assumed to be located in middle and upper course of the river Drina, on its left bank in Bosnia and Herzegovina. Podrinje was part of the first Serbian principality, in the Early Middle Ages. John Kinnamos (1143–1185) noted that the river Drina separated Bosnia from Serbia, while one Papal document from 1187 erroneously identified Bosnia as part of Serbia. Early medieval Bosnian state included regions on the left bank of the Drina, where the župa was located. Bosnian noble family of Pavlović ruled the region, along with other feudal possessions that extended from the middle and Upper Drina river to the south-southeastern regions of the Bosnian realm in Hum and Konavle at the Adriatic coast. The family official residence and seat was at Borač and later Pavlovac, above the Prača river canyon, between present-day Prača, Rogatica and Goražde (all in Bosnia and Herzegovina). Also, it was part of the dominion of the Kosača noble family, while another lesser Bosnian noble family had their possessions in the region, namely Dinjčić noble family's.

The Drina župa was mentioned in the Chronicle of the Priest of Duklja (CPD, ca. 1300), as the site of a battle and the fief of Serbian nobleman Tihomir during Prince Časlav's reign (927–960). In 1359, veliki čelnik Dimitrije (fl. 1349–59) is mentioned as holding Gacko, Drina, Dabar, and Rudine.
Drina is further mentioned as an area with Soko (transl. Falcone) fortress in 1444, as a dominium (lordship, knežina) in 1448, as a lordship with Soko fortress in 1454.

== Sources ==
- Novaković, Relja (2010) [1981]. "Gde se nalazila Srbija od VII do XII veka: Zaključak i rezime monografije" (Internet ed.).
- Živković, Tibor (2006). Portreti srpskih vladara (IX—XII vek). Belgrade. pp. 11–20. ISBN 86-17-13754-1.
- Blagojević, Miloš (2001). Državna uprava u srpskim srednjovekovnim zemljama. Službeni list SRJ. pp. 212, 294, 301. ISBN 9788635504971.
- Vego, Marko (1980). Iz istorije srednjovjekovne Bosne i Hercegovine. "Svjetlost," OOUR Izdavačka djelatnost.
- Vego, Marko (1982). Postanak srednjovjekovne bosanske države (in Croatian). Svjetlost.
- SKA (1908). Glas. Vol. 78–80. SKA. p. 196.
- SKA (1935). Glas. Vol. 167. SKA. p. 10.
