= Previla =

Previla Превила
- Village
- Location within Bosnia and Herzegovina
- Coordinates: 43°37′26″N 18°45′08″E
- Country: Bosnia and Herzegovina
- Entity: Federation of Bosnia and Herzegovina
- Canton: Bosnian-Podrinje Goražde
- Municipality: Foča-Ustikolina

Area
  - Total: 3.46 sq mi (8.95 km^{2})

Population (2013)
  - Total: 5
  - Density: 1.4/sq mi (0.56/km^{2})
- Time zone: UTC+1 (CET)
  - Summer (DST): UTC+2 (CEST)

Previla a village in the municipality of Foča-Ustikolina, Bosnia and Herzegovina.

== Demographics ==
According to the 2013 census, its population was 5, all Bosniaks.
