= Jabuka, Foča-Uskotlina =

Jabuka
- Village
- Location within Bosnia and Herzegovina
- Coordinates: 43°37′41″N 18°40′20″E
- Country: Bosnia and Herzegovina
- Entity: Federation of Bosnia and Herzegovina
- Canton: Bosnian-Podrinje Goražde
- Municipality: Foča-Ustikolina

Area
  - Total: 2.32 sq mi (6.02 km^{2})

Population (2013)
  - Total: 88
  - Density: 38/sq mi (15/km^{2})
- Time zone: UTC+1 (CET)
  - Summer (DST): UTC+2 (CEST)

Jabuka (Foča) is a village in the municipality of Foča-Ustikolina, Bosnia and Herzegovina.

The word jabuka means apple in Bosnian.

== Demographics ==
According to the 2013 census, its population was 88, all Bosniaks.
