= Mazlina =

Mazlina Мазлина
- Village
- Location within Bosnia and Herzegovina
- Coordinates: 43°38′07″N 18°37′18″E
- Country: Bosnia and Herzegovina
- Entity: Federation of Bosnia and Herzegovina
- Canton: Bosnian-Podrinje Goražde
- Municipality: Foča-Ustikolina

Area
  - Total: 6.64 sq mi (17.19 km^{2})

Population (2013)
  - Total: 30
  - Density: 4.5/sq mi (1.7/km^{2})
- Time zone: UTC+1 (CET)
  - Summer (DST): UTC+2 (CEST)

Mazlina (Serbian Cyrillic: Мазлина) is a village in the municipality of Foča-Ustikolina, Bosnia and Herzegovina.

== Demographics ==
According to the 2013 census, its population was 30, all Bosniaks.
