= Glušca =

Glušca Глушца
- Village
- Location within Bosnia and Herzegovina
- Coordinates: 43°35′44″N 18°37′51″E
- Country: Bosnia and Herzegovina
- Entity: Federation of Bosnia and Herzegovina
- Region Canton: East Sarajevo; Bosnian-Podrinje Goražde
- Municipality: Foča; Foča-Ustikolina

Area
  - Total: 2.01 sq mi (5.21 km^{2})

Population (2013)
  - Total: 0
  - Density: 0.0/sq mi (0.0/km^{2})
- Time zone: UTC+1 (CET)
  - Summer (DST): UTC+2 (CEST)

Glušca (Serbian Cyrillic: Глушца) is a village in the municipalities of Foča, Republika Srpska and Foča-Ustikolina, Bosnia and Herzegovina.

== Demographics ==
According to the 2013 census, its population was nil, down from 34 living in the Republika Srpska part in 1991, and none living in the Foča-Ustikolina part then.
