= Gostičaj =

Gostičaj Гостичај
- Village
- Location within Bosnia and Herzegovina
- Coordinates: 43°35′N 18°53′E
- Country: Bosnia and Herzegovina
- Entity: Federation of Bosnia and Herzegovina
- Region Canton: East Sarajevo; Bosnian-Podrinje Goražde
- Municipality: Foča; Foča-Ustikolina

Area
  - Total: 1.43 sq mi (3.70 km^{2})

Population (2013)
  - Total: 4
  - Density: 2.8/sq mi (1.1/km^{2})
- Time zone: UTC+1 (CET)
  - Summer (DST): UTC+2 (CEST)

Gostičaj (Serbian Cyrillic: Гостичај) is a village in the municipalities of Foča, Republika Srpska and Foča-Ustikolina, Bosnia and Herzegovina.

The villages population consists mostly of Muslims. The village was destroyed by Serbs in May 1992 and a few of the Bosniak inhabitants were massacred.

== Demographics ==
According to the 2013 census, its population was 4, all Bosniaks living in the Foča-Ustikolina part, thus none living in the Republika Srpska part.
