= Bunčići =

Bunčići Бунчићи
- Village
- Location within Bosnia and Herzegovina
- Coordinates: 43°37′20″N 18°45′06″E
- Country: Bosnia and Herzegovina
- Entity: Federation of Bosnia and Herzegovina
- Canton: Bosnian-Podrinje Goražde
- Municipality: Foča-Ustikolina

Area
  - Total: 1.97 sq mi (5.11 km^{2})

Population (2013)
  - Total: 3
  - Density: 1.5/sq mi (0.59/km^{2})
- Time zone: UTC+1 (CET)
  - Summer (DST): UTC+2 (CEST)

Bunčići (Serbian Cyrillic: Бунчићи) is a village in the municipality of Foča-Ustikolina, Bosnia and Herzegovina.

== Demographics ==
According to the 2013 census, its population was 3.

Ethnicity in 2013
Ethnicity	Number	Percentage
Serbs	2	100%
Bosniaks	0	0
Total	2	100%
