= Donje Žešće =

Donje Žešće Доње Жешће
- Village
- Location within Bosnia and Herzegovina
- Coordinates: 43°36′N 18°44′E
- Country: Bosnia and Herzegovina
- Entity: Federation of Bosnia and Herzegovina
- Canton: Bosnian-Podrinje Goražde
- Municipality: Foča-Ustikolina

Area
  - Total: 2.80 sq mi (7.26 km^{2})

Population (2013)
  - Total: 13
  - Density: 4.6/sq mi (1.8/km^{2})
- Time zone: UTC+1 (CET)
  - Summer (DST): UTC+2 (CEST)

Donje Žešće (Serbian Cyrillic: Доње Жешће) is a village in the municipality of Foča-Ustikolina, Bosnia and Herzegovina.

== Demographics ==
According to the 2013 census, its population was 13.

Ethnicity in 2013
Ethnicity	Number	Percentage
Serbs	12	92.3%
Bosniaks	1	7.7%
Total	13	100%
