= Račići =

Račići Рачићи
- Village
- Location within Bosnia and Herzegovina
- Coordinates: 43°39′01″N 18°39′25″E
- Country: Bosnia and Herzegovina
- Entity: Federation of Bosnia and Herzegovina
- Canton: Bosnian-Podrinje Goražde
- Municipality: Foča-Ustikolina

Area
  - Total: 0.11 sq mi (0.29 km^{2})

Population (2013)
  - Total: 2
  - Density: 18/sq mi (6.9/km^{2})
- Time zone: UTC+1 (CET)
  - Summer (DST): UTC+2 (CEST)

Račići (Serbian Cyrillic: Рачићи) is a village in the municipality of Foča-Ustikolina, Bosnia and Herzegovina.

== Demographics ==
According to the 2013 census, its population was two, both Serbs.
