= Lokve, Foča =

Lokve Локве
- Village
- Location within Bosnia and Herzegovina
- Coordinates: 43°35′48″N 18°42′12″E
- Country: Bosnia and Herzegovina
- Entity: Federation of Bosnia and Herzegovina
- Canton: Bosnian-Podrinje Goražde
- Municipality: Foča-Ustikolina

Area
  - Total: 3.20 sq mi (8.28 km^{2})

Population (2013)
  - Total: 79
  - Density: 25/sq mi (9.5/km^{2})
- Time zone: UTC+1 (CET)
  - Summer (DST): UTC+2 (CEST)

Lokve (Serbian Cyrillic: Локве) is a village in the municipality of Foča-Ustikolina, Bosnia and Herzegovina.

== Demographics ==
According to the 2013 census, its population was 79.

Ethnicity in 2013
Ethnicity	Number	Percentage
Bosniaks	78	98.7%
Serbs	1	1.3%
Total	79	100%
