= Prisoje, Foča =

Prisoje Присоје
- Village
- Location within Bosnia and Herzegovina
- Coordinates: 43°31′18″N 18°45′00″E
- Country: Bosnia and Herzegovina
- Entity: Federation of Bosnia and Herzegovina
- Region Canton: East Sarajevo; Bosnian-Podrinje Goražde
- Municipality: Foča; Foča-Ustikolina

Area
  - Total: 0.99 sq mi (2.57 km^{2})

Population (2013)
  - Total: 19
  - Density: 19/sq mi (7.4/km^{2})
- Time zone: UTC+1 (CET)
  - Summer (DST): UTC+2 (CEST)

Prisoje (Serbian Cyrillic: Присоје) is a village in the municipalities of Foča, Republika Srpska and Foča-Ustikolina, Bosnia and Herzegovina.

== Demographics ==
According to the 2013 census, its population was 19, with 6 of them living in the Republika Srpska part, and 13 in the Foča-Ustikolina part.

Ethnicity in 2013
Ethnicity	Number	Percentage
Bosniaks	11	57.9%
Serbs	8	42.1%
Total	19	100%
