= Rodijelj =

Rodijelj Родијељ
- Village
- Location within Bosnia and Herzegovina
- Coordinates: 43°40′N 18°40′E
- Country: Bosnia and Herzegovina
- Entity: Federation of Bosnia and Herzegovina
- Region Canton: East Sarajevo; Bosnian-Podrinje Goražde
- Municipality: Foča; Foča-Ustikolina

Area
  - Total: 3.31 sq mi (8.58 km^{2})

Population (2013)
  - Total: 45
  - Density: 14/sq mi (5.2/km^{2})
- Time zone: UTC+1 (CET)
  - Summer (DST): UTC+2 (CEST)

Rodijelj (Serbian Cyrillic: Родијељ) is a village in the municipalities of Foča, Republika Srpska and Foča-Ustikolina, Bosnia and Herzegovina.

== Demographics ==
According to the 2013 census, its population was 45, all Bosniaks with 32 living in the Republika Srpska part, and 13 living in the Foča-Ustikolina part.
