= Sorlaci =

Sorlaci Сорлаци
- Village
- Location within Bosnia and Herzegovina
- Coordinates: 43°34′49″N 18°51′07″E
- Country: Bosnia and Herzegovina
- Entity: Federation of Bosnia and Herzegovina
- Region Canton: East Sarajevo; Bosnian-Podrinje Goražde
- Municipality: Foča; Foča-Ustikolina

Area
  - Total: 2.08 sq mi (5.38 km^{2})

Population (2013)
  - Total: 5
  - Density: 2.4/sq mi (0.93/km^{2})
- Time zone: UTC+1 (CET)
  - Summer (DST): UTC+2 (CEST)

Sorlaci (Serbian Cyrillic: Сорлаци) is a village in the municipalities of Foča, Republika Srpska and Foča-Ustikolina, Bosnia and Herzegovina.

== Demographics ==
According to the 2013 census, its population was 5, all Serbs living in the Republika Srpska part, thus none living in the Foča-Ustikolina part.
