= Filipovići, Foča =

Filipovići
- Village
- Location within Bosnia and Herzegovina
- Coordinates: 43.5662901°N 18.7830162°E
- Country: Bosnia and Herzegovina
- Entity: Federation of Bosnia and Herzegovina
- Region Canton: East Sarajevo; Bosnian-Podrinje Goražde
- Municipality: Foča; Foča-Ustikolina

Area
  - Total: 1.35 sq mi (3.49 km^{2})

Population (2013)
  - Total: 124
  - Density: 92.0/sq mi (35.5/km^{2})
- Time zone: UTC+1 (CET)
  - Summer (DST): UTC+2 (CEST)

Filipovići is a village in the municipalities of Foča, Republika Srpska and Foča-Ustikolina, Bosnia and Herzegovina.

== Demographics ==
According to the 2013 census, its population was 124, with 38 of them living in the Republika Srpska part, and 86 living in the Foča-Ustikolina part.

Ethnicity in 2013
Ethnicity	Number	Percentage
Bosniaks	118	95.2%
Serbs	6	4.8%
Total	124	100%
