= Mravljača =

Mravljača Мрављача
- Village
- Location within Bosnia and Herzegovina
- Coordinates: 43°36′36″N 18°45′19″E
- Country: Bosnia and Herzegovina
- Entity: Federation of Bosnia and Herzegovina
- Canton: Bosnian-Podrinje Goražde
- Municipality: Foča-Ustikolina

Area
  - Total: 2.69 sq mi (6.98 km^{2})

Population (2013)
  - Total: 4
  - Density: 1.5/sq mi (0.57/km^{2})
- Time zone: UTC+1 (CET)
  - Summer (DST): UTC+2 (CEST)

Mravljača (Serbian Cyrillic: Мрављача) is a village in the municipality of Foča-Ustikolina, Bosnia and Herzegovina.

== Demographics ==
According to the 2013 census, its population was four, all Serbs.
