= Njuhe =

Njuhe Њухе
- Village
- Location within Bosnia and Herzegovina
- Coordinates: 43°35′34″N 18°48′27″E
- Country: Bosnia and Herzegovina
- Entity: Federation of Bosnia and Herzegovina
- Canton: Bosnian-Podrinje Goražde
- Municipality: Foča-Ustikolina

Area
  - Total: 1.36 sq mi (3.51 km^{2})

Population (2013)
  - Total: 110
  - Density: 81/sq mi (31/km^{2})
- Time zone: UTC+1 (CET)
  - Summer (DST): UTC+2 (CEST)

Njuhe (Serbian Cyrillic: Њухе) is a village in the municipality of Foča-Ustikolina, Bosnia and Herzegovina.

== Demographics ==
According to the 2013 census, its population was 110.

Ethnicity in 2013
Ethnicity	Number	Percentage
Bosniaks	109	99.1%
Serbs	1	0.9%
Total	110	100%
