= Zebina Šuma =

Zebina Šuma Зебина Шума
- Village
- Location within Bosnia and Herzegovina
- Coordinates: 43°36′07″N 18°50′30″E
- Country: Bosnia and Herzegovina
- Entity: Federation of Bosnia and Herzegovina
- Canton: Bosnian-Podrinje Goražde
- Municipality: Foča-Ustikolina

Area
  - Total: 3.13 sq mi (8.10 km^{2})

Population (2013)
  - Total: 257
  - Density: 82.2/sq mi (31.7/km^{2})
- Time zone: UTC+1 (CET)
  - Summer (DST): UTC+2 (CEST)

Zebina Šuma (Serbian Cyrillic: Зебина Шума) is a village in the municipality of Foča-Ustikolina, Bosnia and Herzegovina.

== Demographics ==
According to the 2013 census, its population was 257.

Ethnicity in 2013
Ethnicity	Number	Percentage
Bosniaks	256	99.6%
other/undeclared	1	0.4%
Total	257	100%
