= Bešlići =

Bešlići Бешлићи
- Village
- Location within Bosnia and Herzegovina
- Coordinates: 43°38′52″N 18°38′48″E
- Country: Bosnia and Herzegovina
- Entity: Federation of Bosnia and Herzegovina
- Canton: Bosnian-Podrinje Goražde
- Municipality: Foča-Ustikolina

Area
  - Total: 1.87 sq mi (4.84 km^{2})

Population (2013)
  - Total: 11
  - Density: 5.9/sq mi (2.3/km^{2})
- Time zone: UTC+1 (CET)
  - Summer (DST): UTC+2 (CEST)

Bešlići (Serbian Cyrillic: Бешлићи) is a village in the municipality of Foča-Ustikolina, Bosnia and Herzegovina.

== Demographics ==
According to the 2013 census, its population was 11, all Bosniaks.
