= Bavčići =

Bavčići Бавчићи
- Village
- Location within Bosnia and Herzegovina
- Coordinates: 43°35′03″N 18°50′26″E
- Country: Bosnia and Herzegovina
- Entity: Federation of Bosnia and Herzegovina
- Canton: Bosnian-Podrinje Goražde
- Municipality: Foča-Ustikolina

Area
  - Total: 1.26 sq mi (3.26 km^{2})

Population (2013)
  - Total: 38
  - Density: 30/sq mi (12/km^{2})
- Time zone: UTC+1 (CET)
  - Summer (DST): UTC+2 (CEST)

Bavčići (Serbian Cyrillic: Бавчићи) is a village in the municipality of Foča-Ustikolina, Bosnia and Herzegovina.

== Demographics ==
According to the 2013 census, its population was 38, all Bosniaks.
