= Brajići, Foča =

Brajići Брајићи
- Village
- Location within Bosnia and Herzegovina
- Coordinates: 43°33′57″N 18°46′12″E
- Country: Bosnia and Herzegovina
- Entity: Federation of Bosnia and Herzegovina
- Region Canton: East Sarajevo; Bosnian-Podrinje Goražde
- Municipality: Foča; Foča-Ustikolina

Area
  - Total: 1.93 sq mi (4.99 km^{2})

Population (2013)
  - Total: 48
  - Density: 25/sq mi (9.6/km^{2})
- Time zone: UTC+1 (CET)
  - Summer (DST): UTC+2 (CEST)

Brajići (Serbian Cyrillic: Брајићи) is a village in the municipalities of Foča, Republika Srpska and Foča-Ustikolina, Bosnia and Herzegovina.

== Demographics ==
According to the 2013 census, its population was 48, all Bosniaks, 35 living in the Republika Srpska part, and 13 living in the Foča-Ustikolina part.
