= Marevo =

Marevo Марево
- Village
- Location within Bosnia and Herzegovina
- Coordinates: 43°34′08″N 18°42′03″E
- Country: Bosnia and Herzegovina
- Entity: Federation of Bosnia and Herzegovina
- Region Canton: East Sarajevo; Bosnian-Podrinje Goražde
- Municipality: Foča; Foča-Ustikolina

Area
  - Total: 1.93 sq mi (4.99 km^{2})

Population (2013)
  - Total: 20
  - Density: 10/sq mi (4.0/km^{2})
- Time zone: UTC+1 (CET)
  - Summer (DST): UTC+2 (CEST)

Marevo (Serbian Cyrillic: Марево) is a village in the municipalities of Foča, Republika Srpska and Foča-Ustikolina, Bosnia and Herzegovina.

== Demographics ==
According to the 2013 census, its population was 20, all Bosniaks living in the Republika Srpska part, thus none living in the Foča-Ustikolina part.
