= Podgrađe, Foča =

Podgrađe Подграђе
- Village
- Location within Bosnia and Herzegovina
- Coordinates: 43°38′28″N 18°40′44″E
- Country: Bosnia and Herzegovina
- Entity: Federation of Bosnia and Herzegovina
- Canton: Bosnian-Podrinje Goražde
- Municipality: Foča-Ustikolina

Area
  - Total: 2.50 sq mi (6.47 km^{2})

Population (2013)
  - Total: 4
  - Density: 1.6/sq mi (0.62/km^{2})
- Time zone: UTC+1 (CET)
  - Summer (DST): UTC+2 (CEST)

Podgrađe (Serbian Cyrillic: Подграђе) is a village in the municipality of Foča-Ustikolina, Bosnia and Herzegovina.

== Demographics ==
According to the 2013 census, its population was 4, all Serbs.
