= Petojevići =

Petojevići Петојевићи
- Village
- Location within Bosnia and Herzegovina
- Coordinates: 43°37′N 18°48′E
- Country: Bosnia and Herzegovina
- Entity: Federation of Bosnia and Herzegovina
- Canton: Bosnian-Podrinje Goražde
- Municipality: Foča-Ustikolina

Area
  - Total: 2.05 sq mi (5.31 km^{2})

Population (2013)
  - Total: 23
  - Density: 11/sq mi (4.3/km^{2})
- Time zone: UTC+1 (CET)
  - Summer (DST): UTC+2 (CEST)

Petojevići (Serbian Cyrillic: Петојевићи) is a village in the municipality of Foča-Ustikolina, Bosnia and Herzegovina.

== Demographics ==
According to the 2013 census, its population was 23, all Bosniaks.
