= Kolun =

Kolun Колун
- Village
- Location within Bosnia and Herzegovina
- Coordinates: 43°34′48″N 18°39′22″E
- Country: Bosnia and Herzegovina
- Entity: Federation of Bosnia and Herzegovina
- Region Canton: East Sarajevo; Bosnian-Podrinje Goražde
- Municipality: Foča (RS); Foča (FBiH)

Area
  - Total: 3.74 sq mi (9.68 km^{2})

Population (2013)
  - Total: 17
  - Density: 4.5/sq mi (1.8/km^{2})
- Time zone: UTC+1 (CET)
  - Summer (DST): UTC+2 (CEST)

Kolun (Serbian Cyrillic: Колун) is a village in the municipalities of Foča, Republika Srpska and Foča, Federation of Bosnia and Herzegovina, Bosnia and Herzegovina.

== History ==
Within the village there is a Turbe that was constructed in 1761, inside are buried Sheikh Murat and his son Salih.

== Demographics ==
According to the 2013 census, its population was 17, all living in the Republika Srpska part, thus none living in the Foča FBiH part.

Ethnic structure of Kolun
| Ethnicity | 2013 | % | 1991 | % |
|---|---|---|---|---|
| Bosniaks | 15 | 88.2 | 110 | 61.8 |
| Serbs | 2 | 11.8 | 66 | 37.1 |
| Others | 0 | 0 | 2 | 1.1 |
| Total | 17 | | 178 | |
