= Kolakovići, Foča =

Kolakovići Колаковићи
- Village
- Location within Bosnia and Herzegovina
- Coordinates: 43°35′51″N 18°33′21″E
- Country: Bosnia and Herzegovina
- Entity: Federation of Bosnia and Herzegovina
- Canton: Bosnian-Podrinje Goražde
- Municipality: Foča-Ustikolina

Area
  - Total: 2.64 sq mi (6.84 km^{2})

Population (2013)
  - Total: 0
  - Density: 0.0/sq mi (0.0/km^{2})
- Time zone: UTC+1 (CET)
  - Summer (DST): UTC+2 (CEST)

Kolakovići (Serbian Cyrillic: Колаковићи) is a village in the municipality of Foča-Ustikolina, Bosnia and Herzegovina.

== Demographics ==
According to the 2013 census, its population was nil, down from 64 in 1991.
