= Zabor, Foča =

Zabor Забор
- Village
- Location within Bosnia and Herzegovina
- Coordinates: 43°36′48″N 18°39′22″E
- Country: Bosnia and Herzegovina
- Entity: Federation of Bosnia and Herzegovina
- Canton: Bosnian-Podrinje Goražde
- Municipality: Foča-Ustikolina

Area
  - Total: 3.02 sq mi (7.83 km^{2})

Population (2013)
  - Total: 17
  - Density: 5.6/sq mi (2.2/km^{2})
- Time zone: UTC+1 (CET)
  - Summer (DST): UTC+2 (CEST)

Zabor (Serbian Cyrillic: Забор) is a village in the municipality of Foča-Ustikolina, Bosnia and Herzegovina.

== Demographics ==
According to the 2013 census, its population was 17, all Bosniaks.
