= Rudine (župa) =

Medieval župa (county)

Coordinates: 43.7137977°N 19.1910553°E

Rudine (Serbian Cyrillic: Рудине) was a medieval župa (county), which was, according to author Gordana Tomović, located around Rogatica (now in eastern Bosnia and Herzegovina).

According to the same author, it is believed that Vojin held Gacko (1327), while his brother Hrvatin held Rudine, the latter having inflicted damages to the Republic of Ragusa in 1330. It is possible that Hrvatin held Gacko with Rudine, Drina and Dabar. Also, Vuk Kosača (1317–1359), who served Stefan Dušan and distinguished himself in the military, was awarded the spacious province of Rudine.

== Sources ==
- Dinić, Mihailo (1940). "Земље Херцега Светога Саве". Glas SKA. 182. Belgrade: SKA: 149–257.
- Tomović, Gordana (2011). Rudić, Srđan (ed.). "Vojinovići". Споменица академика Симе Ћирковића [Homage to Academician Sima Ćirković]. Istorijski institut: 355–366. ISBN 978-86-7743-091-7.
- Tomović, Gordana (2009). "Oblasni gospodari u 14. veku: Užice nekad i sad: Srednji vek" (PDF). Grad Užice. Archived from the original (PDF) on 2011-07-26.
- Posebna izdanja. Vol. 152. Belgrade: SANU. 1950. p. 56.
