= Dragomilići =

Dragomilići Драгомилићи
- Village
- Location within Bosnia and Herzegovina
- Coordinates: 43°39′N 18°34′E
- Country: Bosnia and Herzegovina
- Entity: Federation of Bosnia and Herzegovina
- Region Canton: Trebinje; Bosnian-Podrinje Goražde
- Municipality: Kalinovik; Foča-Ustikolina

Area
  - Total: 5.12 sq mi (13.27 km^{2})

Population (2013)
  - Total: 2
  - Density: 0.39/sq mi (0.15/km^{2})
- Time zone: UTC+1 (CET)
  - Summer (DST): UTC+2 (CEST)

Dragomilići (Serbian Cyrillic: Драгомилићи) is a village in the municipalities of Kalinovik, Republika Srpska and Foča-Ustikolina, Bosnia and Herzegovina.

== Demographics ==
According to the 2013 census, its population was 2, both Bosniaks living in the Foča-Ustikolina part, thus none living in the Republika Srpska part.
