= Sinošević =

Sinošević Синошевић (Serbian)
- Village (Selo)
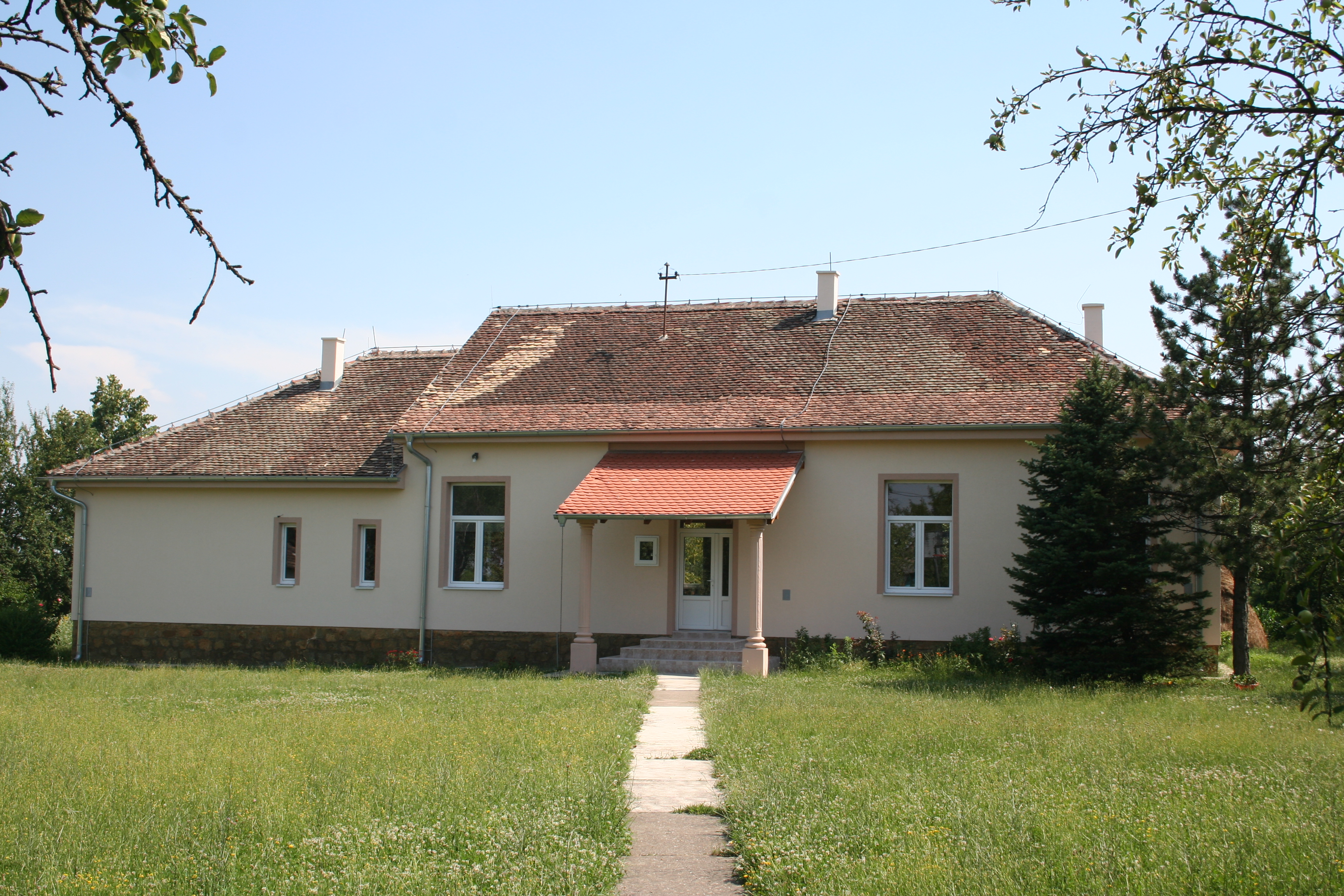

- Location within Serbia
- Coordinates: 44°36′56″N 19°38′21″E
- Country: Serbia
- District: Mačva District
- Municipality: Šabac
- Elevation: 404 ft (123 m)

Population (2002)
  - Total: 918
- Time zone: UTC+1 (CET)
  - Summer (DST): UTC+2 (CEST)

Sinošević (Serbian Cyrillic: Синошевић) is a village in the municipality of Šabac, Serbia. According to the 2002 census, the village had a population of 918 people.
