= Vinorača =

Coordinates: 43.9664°N 21.2308°E

- Village
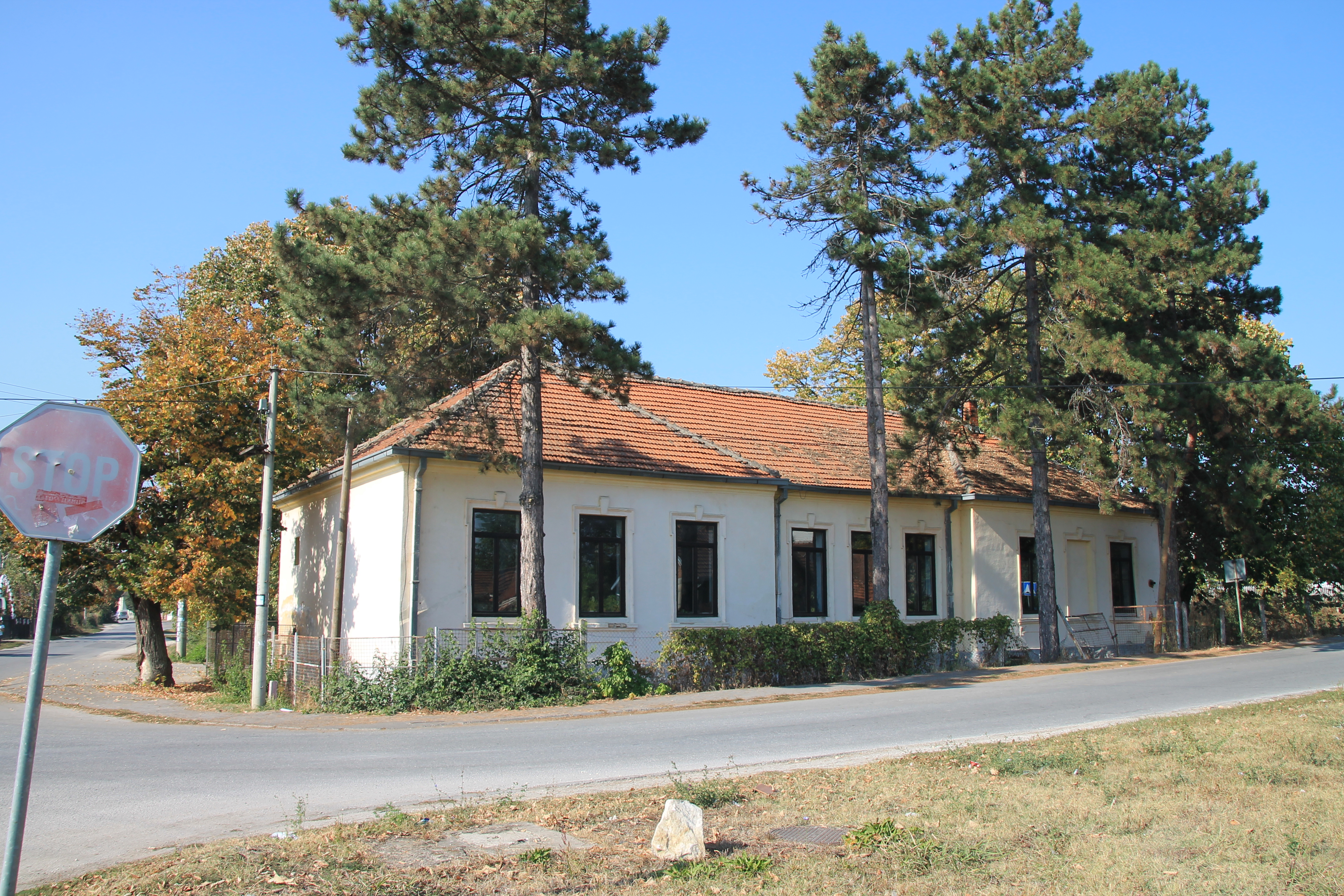
- Interactive map of Vinorača
- Country: Serbia
- District: Pomoravlje District
- Municipality: Jagodina

Population (2002)
  - Total: 799
- Time zone: UTC+1 (CET)
  - Summer (DST): UTC+2 (CEST)

Vinorača is a cottage settlement in the municipality of Jagodina, Serbia. According to the 2002 census, the village has a population of 799 people.
