= Mramorski Potok =

Coordinates: 43°18′49″N 21°44′32″E

- Village
- Interactive map of Mramorski Potok
- Country: Serbia
- District: Nišava District
- Municipality: Niš
- Time zone: UTC+1 (CET)
  - Summer (DST): UTC+2 (CEST)

Mramorski Potok is a village situated in Niš municipality in Serbia.
