= Legendary Magyar-Serbian conflict =

Legendary Hungarian-Serbian conflict

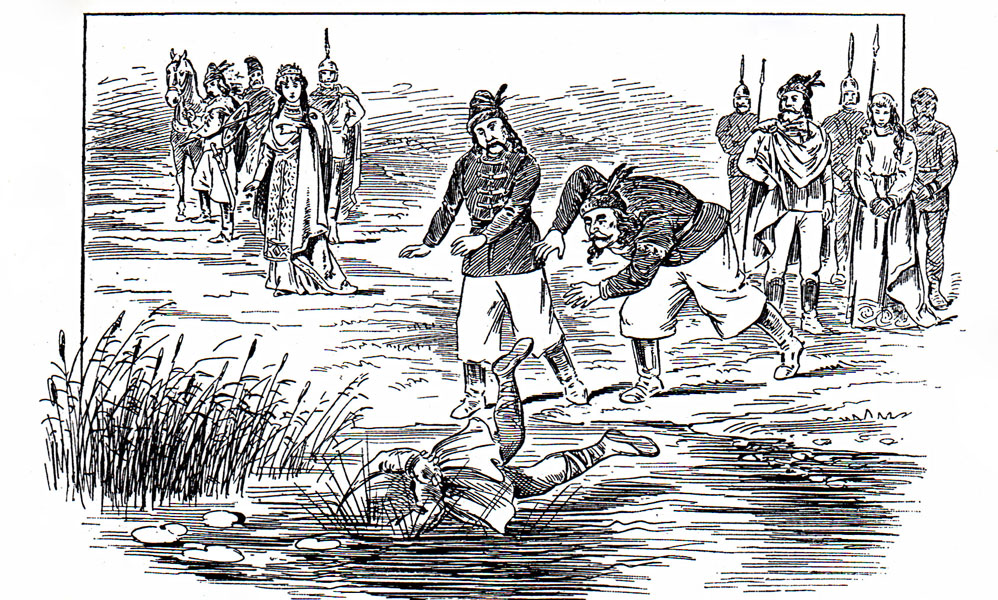
Časlav thrown in the Sava (19th century engraving).

The legendary account of a Magyar-Serbian conflict in the area of the Drina river and Syrmia is found in the Chronicle of the Priest of Duklja (LPD, c. 1300). In historiography, it has been attributed to a conflict surrounding the Serbian principality under Časlav, a Byzantine ally, and the Magyars (Hungarians) that raided Byzantine territory in 933 and again in 943. In the Hungarian chronicle Gesta Hungarorum, there is a story that the Hungarians subjugated the land of Raška (Serbia) at the time of Árpád (r. c.895–c.907), and this is also attributed to Časlav and the conflict mentioned in LPD.

== Stories ==
The LPD mentions how Magyar chieftain Kys (Hungarian: Kiis, Serbian: Kiša) raided and devastated Bosnia and that Časlav (Latin: Ciaslavus, Seislav) clashed with him in the Drina župa (county), next to the river, at the location of Civedino (identified as Cvilin in the upper Drina near Foča) where Kys fell, and the place was called Ciscovo at the time of the scribe. The region of Bosnia at the time was an integral part of Serbia. For distinction in the battle, Časlav gave Tihomil (Latin: Tycomil), who slew Kys, the administration of the Drina župa and wed him with the daughter of the ban (an anachronistic title) of "Raška". In the prelude to the battle, the narrative of Tihomil is based on Biblical motives, the king David. In the meantime, Kys' widow was given troops by the Magyar king to avenge him and entered Syrmia where Časlav was captured and thrown bound by the hands and feet into the Sava river.

In the Hungarian chronicle Gesta Hungarorum, there is a story that the Hungarians subjugated the land of Raška (Serbia) at the time of Árpád (r. c.895–c.907), and for long held the Serbian ruler imprisoned in chains (Latin: ...et ducem eius captum diu ferro ligatum tenuerunt...); while this points to the Serbian ruler Petar (r. 892–917/918), the author's tendency to attribute Pannonian operations to Árpád's time and the fact that Petar had friendly relations with the Magyars, it is more likely that the ruler in question is Časlav, who is also similarly described in LPD (Latin: ...et captus est rex Ciaslavus et omnes parentes illius... ligatis manibus et pedibus...). This points to that there was a tradition regarding a Magyar-Serbian conflict, which received literary expression following two centuries.

== Assessment ==
The accounts in the LPD were based on folklore, and the work is filled with gross chronological and genealogical inconsistencies, the personal names, however, tend to be true. Časlav is found as a Serbian ruler active in the first half of the 10th century, mentioned in the De Administrando Imperio. In the prelude to the Magyar-Serbian conflict, Časlav is mentioned in the LPD as having ousted his father "king Radoslav". Radoslav is found in the DAI as a Serbian ruler as well. The story of Radoslav and Časlav (based on tradition also found in "Pavlimir Belo") points to the beginning of the 9th century, and this discrepancy could be explained either as a well-formed legend that the LPD portrayed as a historical event, or that the story of Radoslav being ousted by his son was a compilation of various historical sources. The LPD's Časlav was most probably the same as Serbian ruler Časlav. Furthermore, Časlav's legendary heir Belo concluded peace with the Hungarians following battles around Sava and the Danube some time before the death of Bulgarian emperor Peter (969).

It is known that the Magyars raided Byzantine territory in 933 and again in 943. The account should be historical events that took place during the reign of Časlav, with his purpose being prevention of Hungarian incursions. For a decade, the Magyars did not raid south of the Danube and Sava, and perhaps, Serbian ruler Časlav was the cause of stopping those operations. In fighting the Magyars, Časlav would have been supported by both Byzantium and Bulgaria. As Časlav began his rule by 933/934 (as per T. Živković's view), the same time that Byzantium was raided by the Magyars, it would imply that Časlav was chosen to deal with them on the initiative of Byzantium. Časlav could have been alive during the 943 Magyar incursion, and failed to stop it, however, he might have died just prior, perhaps in battle. Živković, who studied De Administrando Imperio and Chronicle of the Priest of Duklja in detail, deemed that Časlav ruled roughly between 934 and 944. Mačva, part of the Syrmia region south of Sava, seems to not have come under Hungarian rule following the death of Časlav, and Bosnian territory is explicitly mentioned as part of Serbia. Earlier, V. Ćorović (1885–1941), dated the conflict to c. 960, while Fine Jr. (1983) dated it to around 950–960s. Muhamed Hadžijahić (1918–1986) claimed that Bosnia per LPD in the mid-10th century would have been ruled by Croatian ban Krešimir (usually identified with Michael Krešimir II) and his son Stjepan (identified with Stephen Držislav), without any Hungarian-Serbian war taking place in the 950/960s. The claim by some Croatian and Bosnian historians that Bosnia was part of Croatia is not based on any historical source. D. Dzino mentions the account as possibly just a fantasy.

The legend originated in folklore, perhaps even as a heroic poem. The legend includes characters such as:

- Časlav was a Serbian ruler active 927/928 or 933/934 to 944, mentioned in De Administrando Imperio (DAI). He possibly fought with the Magyars, who were a threat to Bulgaria and Byzantium, and as a Byzantine ally had the role of defending the area south of the Sava and Danube, and he might also have fallen in battle. The name of LPD's Časlav's father, Radoslav, is found in the DAI as a Serbian ruler as well.
- Kys (Latin: Ciz, Chiz, Chys) was a Hungarian nobleman with the title of comes ("count"), who is mentioned in the Viennese illustrative chronicle Chronicon Pictum (1358) as having fought and fallen at the Krassó river in 1128 during the Byzantine–Hungarian War (1127–1129).
- Tihomil is a name derived from the 12th-century Serbian ruler Tihomir (r. 1165–1166), and a legendary figure is also found in the legend of the Nemanjić dynasty in Serbian chronicles as the son of "Beli Uroš".

== See also ==
- Hungarian conquest of the Carpathian Basin

== Sources ==
- Dzino, Danijel (2023). Early Medieval Hum and Bosnia, ca. 450-1200: Beyond Myths. Taylor & Francis. ISBN 9781000893434.
- Fine, John Van Antwerp Jr. (1991) [1983]. The Early Medieval Balkans: A Critical Survey from the Sixth to the Late Twelfth Century. Ann Arbor, Michigan: University of Michigan Press. ISBN 0-472-08149-7.
- Hadžijahić, Muhamed (2004). Povijest Bosne u IX i X stoljeću (from the original University of Michigan ed.). Sarajevo: Preporod. ISBN 9789958820274.
- Komatina, Ivana (2023). "Културна кретања у српско-угарским односима у XIII веку" [Cultural tendencies in the Serbian-Hungarian relations in the 13th century: The Legend of St. Ladislaus and The Life of St. Sava.]. Zbornik radova Vizantoloskog instituta. 60 (2): 979–996.
- Komatina, Predrag (2021). Константин Порфирогенит и рана историја Јужних Словена [Constantine Porphyrogenitus and the Early History of South Slavs]. Византолошки институт, Београд. ISBN 978-86-83883-28-8.
- Kowalski, Wawrzyniec (2021). The Kings of the Slavs: The Image of a Ruler in the Latin Text of The Chronicle of the Priest of Duklja. BRILL. ISBN 9789004447639.
- Kunčer, Dragana (2009). Gesta Regum Sclavorum. Vol. 1. Београд-Никшић: Историјски институт, Манастир Острог.
- Živković, Tibor (2006). Портрети српских владара: IX-XII век [Portraits of Serbian Rulers: IX-XII century]. Завод за уџбенике и наставна средства, Београд. ISBN 9788617137548.
- Živković, Tibor (2008). Forging unity: The South Slavs between East and West 550-1150. Belgrade: The Institute of History, Čigoja štampa. ISBN 978-86-7558-573-2.
- Živković, Tibor (2009). Gesta Regum Sclavorum. Vol. 2. Београд-Никшић: Историјски институт, Манастир Острог.
