= Podrinje =

Geographical region in Bosnia and Herzegovina and Serbia

Coordinates: 44.2667°N 19.3333°E

Podrinje (Serbian Cyrillic: Подриње) is the Slavic name of the Drina river basin, known in English as the Drina Valley. The Drina basin is shared between Bosnia and Herzegovina and Serbia. The part of the Drina basin located in Bosnia and Herzegovina is also called Eastern Bosnia.

== History ==
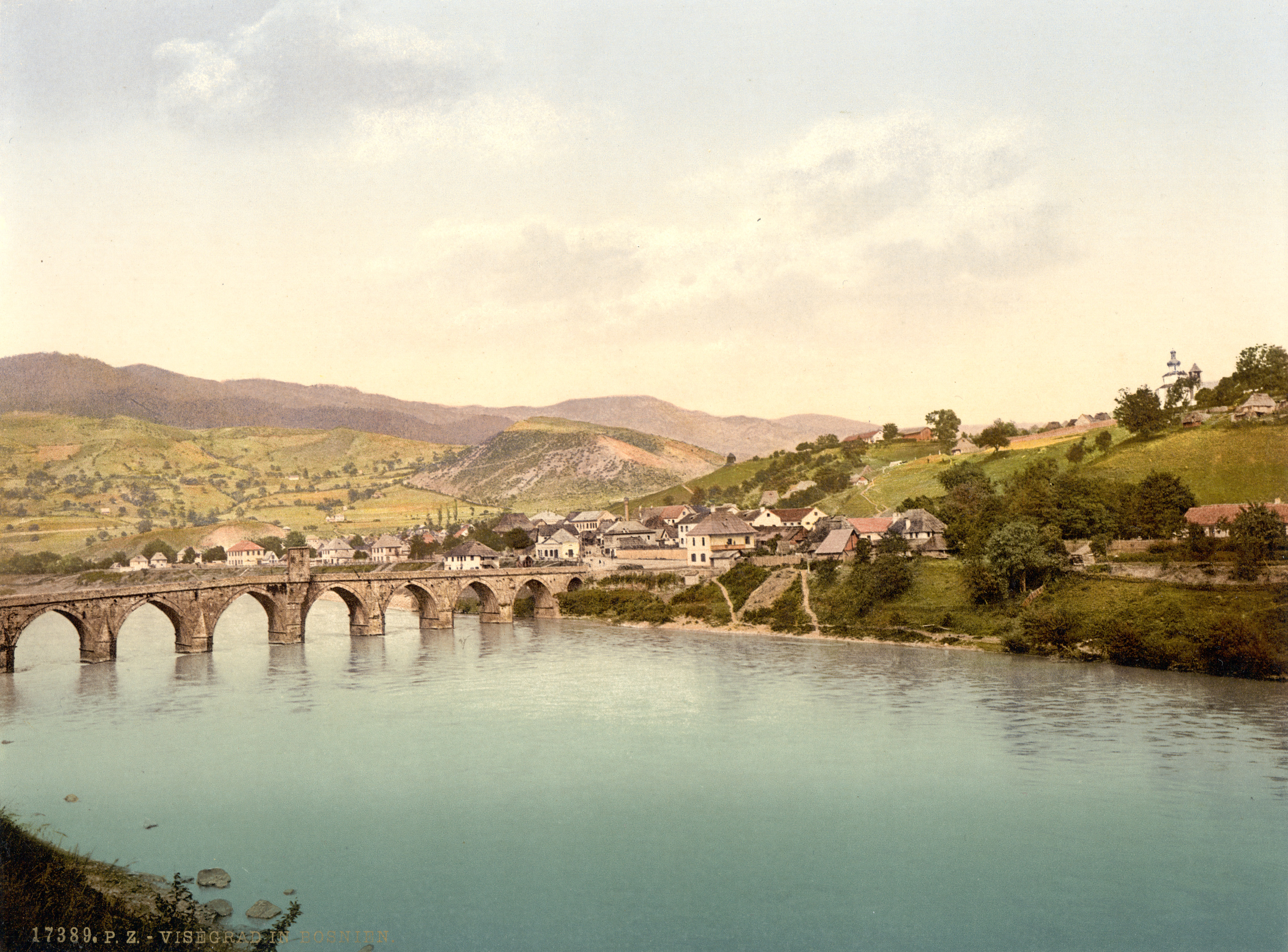
The Mehmed Paša Sokolović Bridge on Drina in Višegrad, c. 1890

Between 1918 and 1922, Podrinje Oblast, with its seat in Šabac, was one of the administartive divisions of the Kingdom of Serbs, Croats, and Slovenes. Between 1922 and 1929, Podrinje Oblast existed in roughly the same area also with its seat in Šabac. In 1929, a large province of the Kingdom of Yugoslavia known as the Drina Banovina was formed with its capital in Sarajevo. Drina Banovina included western parts of present-day Serbia and eastern parts of present-day Bosnia and Herzegovina. Following World War II Axis occupation in 1941, the province was abolished and its territory was divided between the Independent State of Croatia and the area governed by the Nazi Germany Military Administration in Serbia.

In 1941 Yugoslav Partisans liberated the large western part of the German occupied territory. In this territory they proclaimed the Republic of Užice with Užice city as the centre of the Republic. This large free territory was an island of freedom in Nazi-occupied Europe. The Republic of Užice was short-lived. German troops occupied the territory again, while the majority of Partisan forces escaped towards Bosnia. During the Genocide of Serbs by the Croatian fascist Ustaše regime, many Serbs were executed along the Drina Valley for months, especially near Višegrad. Jure Francetić's Black Legion killed thousands of defenceless Bosnian Serb civilians and threw their bodies into the Drina river.

When the Bosnian War broke out in 1992, the Drina Valley became the focus of a bitter campaign of ethnic cleansing by Army of Republika Srpska forces which eventually culminated in the Srebrenica massacres in July 1995. Podrinje was the region of Bosnia and Herzegovina with the highest number of war-related deaths during the Bosnian War, accounting for 28,666 of the 97,207 deaths documented.

== Geography ==
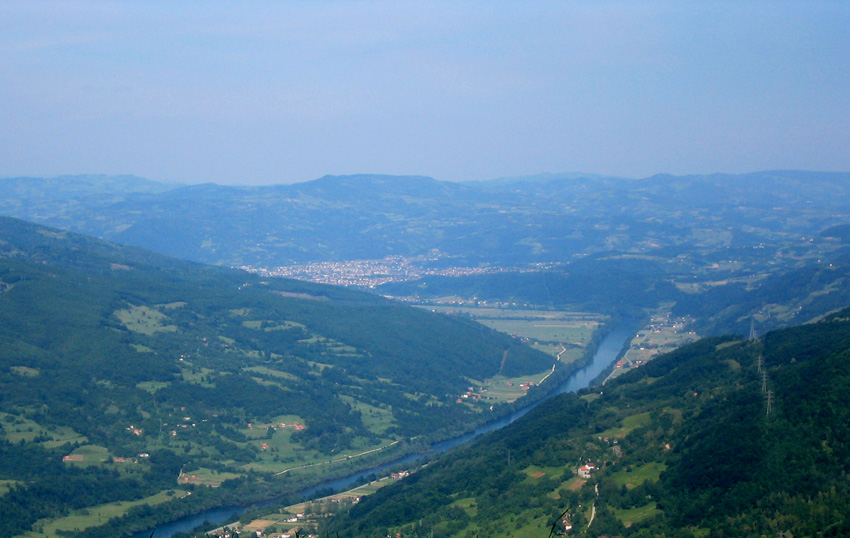
Drina near Bajina Bašta

The Podrinje region is divided into Lower, Middle and Upper Podrinje.

- Lower Podrinje, stretching from the entry of the Drina into the Sava down to Lešnica. It includes the area around Loznica (Serbia).
- Middle Podrinje, includes the area around Bajina Bašta (Serbia), the historical region of Osat (Bosnia).
- Upper Podrinje, includes the area around Goražde (Bosnia).

Principal settlements in Bosnia and Herzegovina (Republika Srpska and Bosnian-Podrinje Canton Goražde):

- Bratunac
- Čajniče
- Foča
- Goražde
- Milići
- Rogatica
- Rudo
- Srebrenica
- Višegrad
- Vlasenica
- Zvornik

Principal settlements in Serbia (Mačva District and Zlatibor District):

- Bajina Bašta
- Ljubovija
- Loznica
- Mali Zvornik

== See also ==
- List of regions of Serbia
- Regions of Bosnia and Herzegovina
