= Cvilin =

Cvilin Цвилин
- Village
- Location within Bosnia and Herzegovina
- Coordinates: 43°34′31″N 18°48′6″E
- Country: Bosnia and Herzegovina
- Entity: Federation of Bosnia and Herzegovina
- Region Canton: East Sarajevo; Bosnian-Podrinje Goražde
- Municipality: Foča; Foča-Ustikolina

Area
  - Total: 1.88 sq mi (4.88 km^{2})

Population (2013)
  - Total: 260
  - Density: 140/sq mi (53/km^{2})
- Time zone: UTC+1 (CET)
  - Summer (DST): UTC+2 (CEST)

Cvilin (Serbian Cyrillic: Цвилин) is a village in the municipalities of Foča, Republika Srpska and Foča-Ustikolina, Bosnia and Herzegovina.

The Chronicle of the Priest of Dioclea recorded that, at the time of Serbian Knez Časlav Klonimirović (c. 927/928 – c. 950), a Hungarian nobleman Kish had plundered Bosnia. The Priest of Dioclea wrote that King Časlav assembled an army and confronted Kish in the Drina area, close to the river. The battle took place in the place of Civelino - i.e. the present-day Cvilin. Kish was defeated and killed in the battle.

== Demographics ==
According to the 2013 census, its population was 260, with 30 living in the Republika Srpska part, and 230 living in the Foča-Ustikolina part.

Ethnicity in 2013
Ethnicity	Number	Percentage
Bosniaks	251	96.5%
Serbs	7	2.7%
other/undeclared	2	0.8%
Total	260	100%
