= Dabar (medieval župa) =

Coordinates: 43.354°N 18.1210°E

Dabar (Serbian Cyrillic: Дабар) was a medieval župa, part of the principality of Zachlumia, and later Hum zemlja. It was first mentioned in the 10th century, in the De Administrando Imperio, as one of five inhabited cities of Zachlumia. It was called Dobriskik. Dabar was situated around the Dabar field (Dabarsko polje), and bordered Dubrava to the west, Nevesinje to the north, Fatnica to the east and Popovo to the south-west. The word dabar in Serbo-Croatian means "beaver", thus, the etymology has been connected to beavers.
There was another region with the same name in the Lim River Valley that had been a part of the Serbian Kingdom until 1373 when Bosnian Ban Tvrtko I adjoined it to his realm.

== Sources ==
- Ђуро Тошић (2005). Средњовјековна хумска жупа Дабар. Istorijski institut. ISBN 978-86-7743-053-5.
- Radmilo Pekić (2005). Жупа Дабар у средњем вијеку. Bileća: Српско просвијетно и културно друштво Просвјета. ISBN 978-99938-90-00-3.
- Ljubo Mihić (1975). Ljubinje sa okolinom. Dragan Srnic.
- SANU (1954). "Жупа Дабар". Srpski etnografski zbornik. Vol. 67. Srpska akademija nauka i umetnosti.
