= Pavle Aršinov =

Serbian writer

Pavle Aršinov (Serbian Cyrillic: Павле Аршинов; 1855 – 1930) was a professor, writer, financier, politician and prominent benefactor and proponent of Privrednik Patronage. He is remembered for writing a seminal work, Šta ćemo i kako ćemo at the turn of the 20th century (1908).

== Biography ==
Pavle Aršinov was born in Veliki Bečkerek, Austrian Empire to a farming family and grew up in the suburb of Gradnulica, Zrenjanin. In 1870, his father Miloš bought him one of Vuk Karadžić's books through subscription. Arsinov finished primary school in his hometown of Veliki Bečkerek. He studied at grammar school in Bečkerek, and higher grades in Kecskemét and Novi Sad in German, Hungarian and Serbian. He began his university studies in natural sciences in Prague as a cadet at the Serbian Tekelianum college in 1879. He moved to Pest, where, in addition to his regular studies, he also studied pedagogy and philosophy. Driven by ideas Svetozar Marković, during his schooling Aršinov studied socialist literature, and was very active in the student societies. After breaking up with Jaša Tomić, he sided with the views of the Radical Party in Serbia.

After graduating, Aršinov moved to Serbia, where he worked as Gymnasium teacher and wrote works on education. When the Serbian business association Privrednik began in 1897, Aršinov went to live in Zagreb to help start the work of the association as well as the Association of Serbian Agricultural Cooperatives. His task was to agitate for these two institutions as the editor of the Privrednik newspaper. There were others who moved to Zagreb, including Jovan Jovanović Zmaj, Kosta Taušanović, Sima Lukin Lazić, and Jovan Paču among others. He also worked on the cultural upliftment of peasants, craftsmen and merchants through a number of topics covered by his Privrednik newspaper. During the First World War, the Austro-Hungarian authorities imprisoned him on charges of high treason. Due to illness, a year before his death, Aršinov resigned as editor of Privrednik, whose editor-in-chief and associate he had been since its founding in 1898. He wrote numerous articles on topics covering the natural sciences, agriculture, social policy, poems and travelogues, and most of his extensive manuscripts relate to popular enlightenment. He also collaborated in various political and literary newspapers, magazines and calendars.

Since retiring in 1924, he settled permanently in Zagreb (at the time in the Kingdom of Yugoslavia), where he died and was buried in 1930.

== Legacy ==
At his home at 28 Cara Dušana Street in Zrenjanin, the Association of Serb Businessmen erected a memorial plaque to him on 15 May 1932 in memory of his work and dedication.

== Works ==
He authored numerous scholastic works on education and pedagogy:

- Serbian Agricultural Cooperatives. Conversation of Serb farmers about agricultural cooperatives , Zagreb 1898 (II edition entitled: "Is there a cure for evil?", Zagreb 1905);
- What's in the world for? Questionnaires from natural sciences , Belgrade 1902;
- Is there a cure for evil? Zagreb 1905, II edition
- Father teaches son, letters of millionaire Greshem , Zagreb 1905;
- Mind and Heart I — III , Novi Sad 1906, 1907, 1910;
- "What are we going to do and how are we going to do it?" (Šta čemo i kako čemo), Belgrade 1908;
- Marko Kraljevic of our days , Belgrade 1922;
- "How we used to be educated in Banat", Belgrade 1926;
- "Privrednikova čitanka", Belgrade 1932;
- "There and there by nature, observations and considerations of a naturalist", Belgrade 1938.

Nothing can be greater in the life of our people, than the movement in the economic field, and which movement comes from the Serbs of Zagreb. The political power of a nation rests on its economic power. In every corner, wherever our people are, we should propagate to gather our world, to unite and get used to the community, both for better or worse. The shout of the Serbs of Zagreb should resonate throughout Serbia: "Let's get stronger economically!"

— Pavle Aršinov, Businessman, 1904

== Literature ==
- Jelena Aršinov, "Pavle Aršinov: život i dela" (1937)
