= Andrija, Prince of Hum =

Andrija
- Prince of Hum
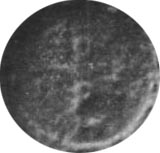
- Seal of Andrija of Hum
- Reign: 1216–1218
- Predecessor: Petar
- Successor: Radoslav
- Born: 1187–89
- Died: c. 1250
- Issue: Radoslav
Names
- Andrija Mirosavljević
- Father: Miroslav of Hum
- Religion: Eastern Orthodoxy (Serbian Church)

Andrija (Serbian Cyrillic: Андрија, fl. 1203–d. c. 1250) was the Prince of Hum (Zahumlje) in 1216–1218 and c. 1250.

== Life ==
Andrija was the heir of Miroslav of Hum, who was the brother of Serbian Grand Prince Stefan Nemanja. Miroslav's properties were divided between Stefan Nemanjić (Nemanja's son), who held the southern parts of Hum, while the Ston coast and Popovo polje was given to young prince Andrija. Andrija's brother Petar withdrew to the northern parts.

Historian Fine concludes that after Miroslav's death in 1198, the Hungarian Duke Andrew tried to seize Hum and managed to defeat some Serbs in Hum in about 1198, acquiring the part of Hum lying northwest of the Neretva (It is not certain if he ever obtained actual control). Duke Andrew was then either pushed out from that territory by Petar, a son of Miroslav supported by local nobles, or Duke Andrew was forced to withdraw his men from the territory when the war between him and his brother King Imre broke out in 1203, so that Petar simply assumed control of western Hum after his withdrawal (though Mavro Orbini has another account). Petar, supported by various local nobles, then expelled his own brother Andrija, who had succeeded in eastern Hum, from his lands. Stefan Nemanjić, Andrija's cousin (Stefan Nemanja's son), then intervened on the behalf and in the name of Andrija (thereby acquiring support from some nobles of Hum) and regained Hum to the Neretva (possibly in about 1216). After the victory, Stefan appointed Andrija as puppet prince of Hum, but later, either because he felt strong enough, or because he felt that the arrangement was not going to succeed in binding Hum to Rascia (Nemanyid Serbia), removed Andrija as governor and left him with only the district of Popovo and the coastland of Hum, and instead installed his own governor there, possibly his own son Stefan Radoslav. Petar, who had held the area between the Neretva and Cetina rivers, then acquired Andrija's holdings (about 1218).

In 1250, Andrija promised the Republic of Ragusa, which had lost its protector Ban Matej Ninoslav of Bosnia, that he would not participate in an eventual war between Ragusa and Serbia and also promised to nicely receive Ragusan refugees in Hum. In that time, Andrija recognized the supreme power of Serbian King Stefan Uroš I, as his vassal, thus it is odd that he would make obligations contrary to Serbian interests – it seems that he prepared a cessation from Serbia, which indeed was made by his son Radoslav, who in 1254 is called a Hungarian vassal.

He founded a church in Mećurečje, in what is now Andrijevica. His seal depicted an eagle, which was not bicephalic, as his father used.

== Family ==
- Bogdan, knez
- Đorđe, knez
- Radoslav, knez
- Vukoslava
- Dragoslava

Regnal titles
Political offices
Preceded by Petar	Prince of Hum under Stefan the First-Crowned; 1216–1218	Succeeded by Stefan Radoslav
Preceded by Stefan Radoslav	Prince of Hum under Stefan Uroš I fl. 1250	Succeeded by Radoslav

== Annotations ==
- Name: Sima Lukin Lazić used Andrija Mirosavljević (Андрија Мирослављевић).
- According to Mavro Orbini: Petar was a native lord, not mentioning any genealogical link between the two (Most scholars think that Petar was the brother of Andrija). Although Andrija was entitled the rule of Hum, soon after his accession the nobility of Hum rose up and instead appointed Petar. Upon Petar's accession, Andrija and Miroslav's widow were exiled. Miroslav's widow took up residence outside Hum at the court of her brother, Ban Kulin of Bosnia. Andrija took residence at the court of Stefan Nemanjić, his cousin (Stefan Nemanja's son). In the meantime, Petar took control of all of Hum after successfully fighting his Bosnian and Croatian neighbours, and Duke Andrew of Hungary who claimed western Hum would have withdrawn from the region by 1203, when he was in conflict with his brother Imre. Stefan Nemanjić then took up the cause of Andrija and attacked Petar in Hum. Stefan then gave most of Hum to his own son Stefan Radoslav, while he gave his cousin Andrija the district of Popovo and the coastland of Hum, including Ston.

== Sources ==
- Fine, John Van Antwerp (1994). The Late Medieval Balkans: A Critical Survey from the Late Twelfth Century to the Ottoman Conquest. Michigan: The University of Michigan Press. pp. 52–54. ISBN 0-472-08260-4.
- Fajfrić, Željko (2000) [1998], Sveta loza Stefana Nemanje, Belgrade: Tehnologije, izdavastvo, agencija Janus
