= Miroslav of Hum =

Serbian prince

Miroslav
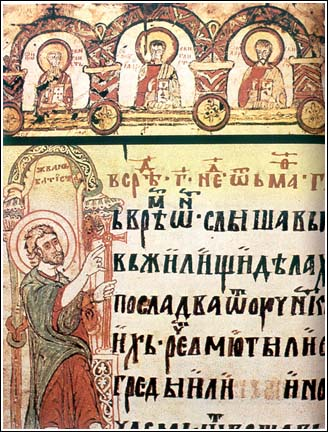
- Miroslav's Gospel
- Born: Ribnica
- Died: 1198
- Title: Grand Prince of Hum (Zahumlia)
- Spouse: The sister of Ban Kulin
- Children: Toljen Miroslavljević; Andrija Miroslavljević
- Parent: Zavida

Signature
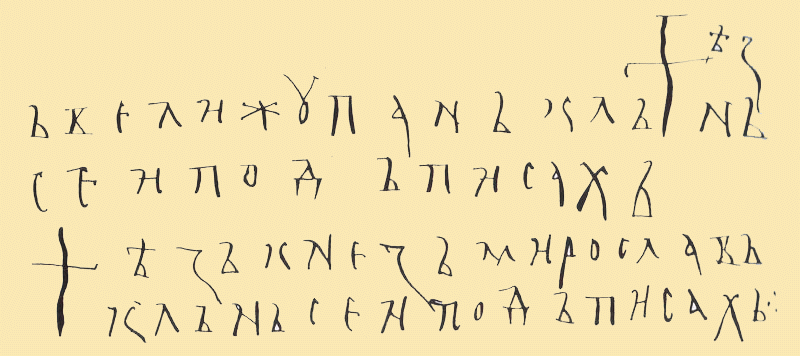

Miroslav Zavidović (Serbian Cyrillic: Мирослав Завидовић) was a 12th-century prince of Zachumlia from 1162 to 1190, an administrative division (appanage) of the Grand Principality of Serbia (Rascia) covering Herzegovina and southern Dalmatia.

== Biography ==
He was born in the second half of the 12th century to Zavida, a Serbian royal that briefly ruled as Prince of Zahumlje, a member of the Vukanović dynasty, he had three brothers; Stefan Nemanja, Tihomir and Stracimir.

=== War among the brothers ===
Miroslav received the appanage of Zahumlje with seat at Ston, where he would rule as Prince or Grand Prince (2nd highest title). Miroslav and his brothers imprisoned Stefan Nemanja after he had built several monasteries, without the approval of Tihomir. Stefan Nemanja rebelled against his eldest brother Tihomir in 1166, who fled with his brothers Stracimir and Miroslav to Greece to seek help. In the same year, Stefan Nemanja defeated the Byzantine army of mercenaries near the town of Pantino on Kosovo in which Tihomir drowned in the river of Sitnica. Miroslav and his brothers were stripped of their titles and the unifification of title is evident as Stefan Nemanja was named "Ruler of All Serbia", Nemanja pardoned his brothers and they continued to rule their lands under him.

=== Rule ===
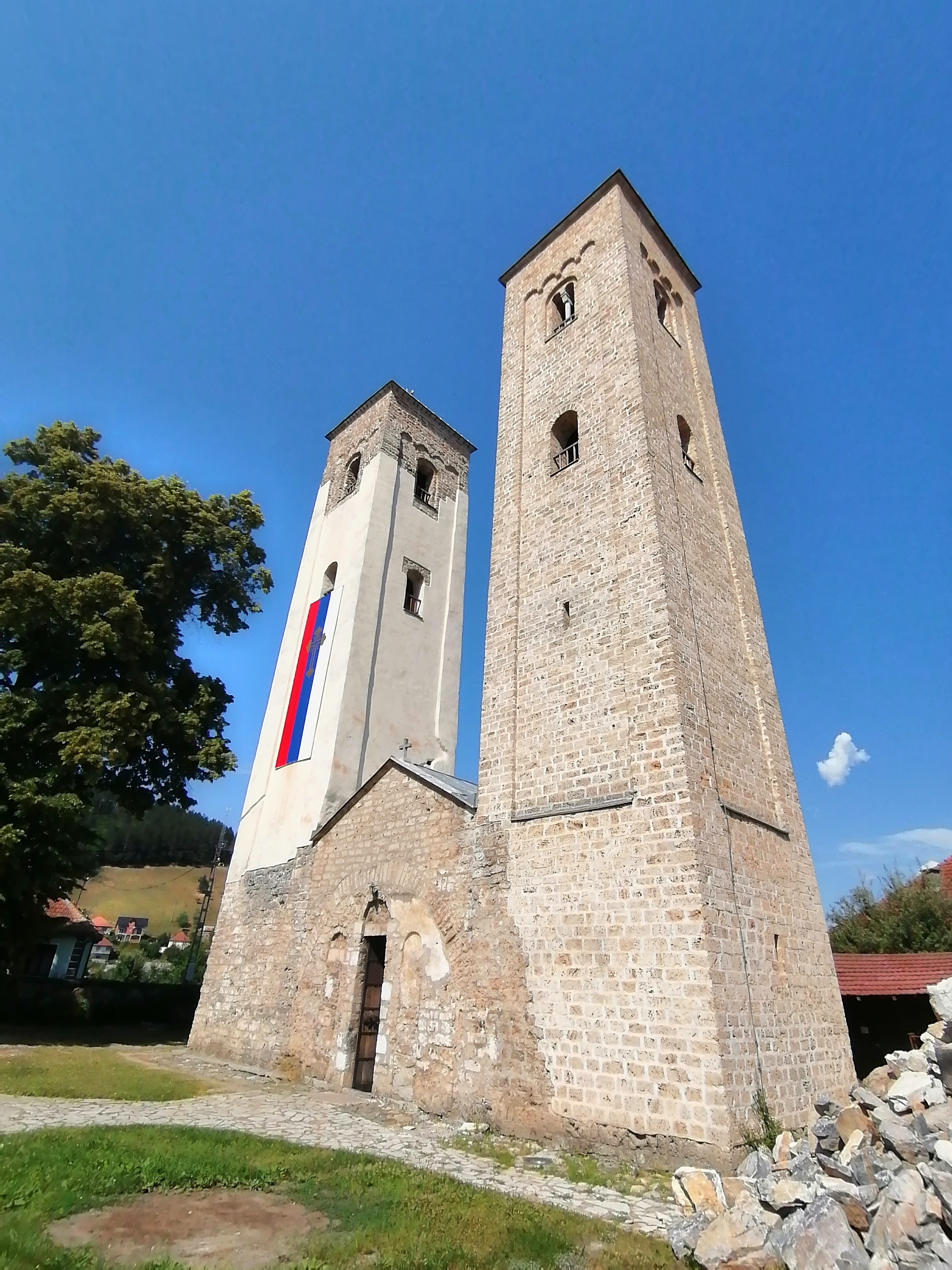
St. Peter church, Bijelo Polje

He built the Monastery of Saint Peter on Lim. He married a sister of Ban Kulin of Bosnia. Following the death of Emperor Manuel, Miroslav put the Narentine Kačić family under his protection, the orchestrators in the murder of Rajneri, Bishop of Split and kept the Bishopric's money for himself also reluctant to allow Catholicism prosper in his region which made him excommunicated by the Papacy in 1181, as a gesture, the Bishop of Ston abandoned his seat and since then the Bishopric of Ston has remained vacant.

In 1184, Miroslav went to retake the islands of Korčula and Vis. On 18 August 1184 Miroslav's fleet was devastated by the Ragusian navy at Poljice near Koločep, and signed peace with the Dubrovnik Republic. He channelled the order to his brother, Prince Stracimir. In 1185, Prince Stracimir raided Korčula and Vis with the fleet of Doclea. He joined the war against the Republic of Ragusa, but was forced to withdraw because Miroslav already made peace by the time Stracimir marshaled his forces. The same year the Byzantines launched a counter-attack on Serbia, but a Bulgarian uprising was raised in the Danubian areas which made the offensive get called-off, so Duke Stefan Nemanja utilized the situation and conquered the Timok Valley with Niš and sacked Svrljig, Ravno and Koželj. While Stefan Nemanja held Niš, it served as his capital and base of operations.

Miroslav was at war with Dubrovnik in 1185, the peace in 1186 was followed by cordial relationship between the two until his death.

The treaty that ended the dispute of Korčula was signed by the Normans (who held Korčula) and Serbs on 27 September 1186, by Stefan Nemanja and Miroslav. Hum renounced its claims on Korčula and Vis.

In 1190–1192, Stefan Nemanja briefly assigned the rule of Hum to his son Rastko Nemanjić (Saint Sava, the first Patriarch of the Serbs), meanwhile Miroslav held the Lim region with Bijelo Polje, Rastko however took monastic vows and Miroslav continued ruling Hum after 1192.

When Stefan Nemanja besieged and retook the power of Duklja in 1180s, Stracimir and Miroslav attacked the forces of Doclean ruler Mihailo.

== Death, family and legacy ==
He died in 1198 of old age, his son Toljen succeeded him as Prince of Hum ca 1192–1196.

He had two sons with the sister of Ban Kulin; Andrija Miroslavljević and Toljen Miroslavljević who married the daughter of Berthold of Andechs. It is thought he had one more son, called Petar Miroslavljević, although this is not fully determined.

Miroslav's Gospel, the oldest known book written in Serbian in Cyrillic, was commissioned by and written in his honour.

Among his foundations is the Saints Peter and Paul Church in Bijelo Polje, on the Lim river, to which he gave 20 villages.

== Sources ==
- Fine, John V. A. Jr. (1994) [1987]. The Late Medieval Balkans: A Critical Survey from the Late Twelfth Century to the Ottoman Conquest. Ann Arbor, Michigan: University of Michigan Press. ISBN 978-0-472-10079-8.
- Стеван Немања Владимир Ћоровић - Историја српског народа, Rastko.rs (in Serbian)

Royal titles
Preceded by Desa	Prince of Zahumlje under Stefan Nemanja (Rascia); 1166–1190	Succeeded by Rastko
Preceded by Rastko	Prince of Zahumlje under Stefan Nemanja (Rascia); 1192	Succeeded by Toljen
