= Petar, Prince of Hum =

13th-century Serbian royalty

Petar Miroslavljević
- Title: Prince of Hum (Zahumlje)
- Parent: Miroslav of Hum

Petar Miroslavljević (Serbian Cyrillic: Петар Мирослављевић) or Petar of Hum was a 13th-century Serbian royalty, that held lands of Hum, in the Principality of Serbia.

== Biography ==
His father was Miroslav of Hum, of the Vukanović dynasty, his mother was a sister of Ban Kulin.

Although his brother Andrija Mirosavljević was entitled as heir of Miroslav, the Hum nobility chose Petar as Prince of Hum. Petar exiled Andrija and Miroslav's widow, Andrija fled to Rascia, to the court of Stefan Nemanjić. At the meantime, Petar fought successfully with neighbouring Bosnia and Croatia. Stefan Nemanjić sided with Andrija and went to war and secured Hum and Popovo field for Andrija sometime after his accession. Petar was defeated and crossed the Neretva, continuing to rule the west and north of the Neretva, which had before 1203 been briefly occupied by Andrew II of Hungary.

He was count of the city of Split 1224/25–1227.

Stefan gave the titular and supreme rule of Hum to his son Radoslav, Andrija initially held the district of Popovo with the coastal lands of Hum, including Ston. By agreement, when Radoslav died, the lands were bound to Andrija.

Ancestors of Petar, Prince of Hum

Zavida
Miroslav of Hum
Petar Mirosavljević

Regnal titles
Political offices
Preceded by Toljen	Prince of Zahumlje; 1198–1216	Succeeded by Andrija
