= Radoslav, Lord of Hum =

13th-century Serbian royalty

Radoslav
- župan (county lord)

Lord of Hum
- Reign: c. 1254
- Predecessor: Andrija, Prince of Hum
- Successor: ?
- Family: Mirosavljević
- Father: Andrija, Prince of Hum
- Occupation: Hungarian vassal

Radoslav (Serbian Cyrillic: Радослав) was the Lord of Hum in c. 1254. Radoslav was the son of Andrija, Prince of Hum. In 1254, Radoslav is mentioned as a Hungarian vassal, with the title of župan (Radoslav Chlmensis íupanus filius comitis Andreae Chlmensis). He had two younger brothers, Bogdan and Đorđe, who served him. He was named after his kinsman Stefan Radoslav. During King Stefan Uroš I's war with the Republic of Ragusa in 1254, Radoslav presented himself in Hum as "sworn vassal of the Hungarian king", Béla IV, and promised to fight for Ragusa as long as it was in conflict with Serbia. He made peace with Ragusa, seen in a charter dated to 22 May 1254. He maintained good relations with Ragusa and Hungary. Following an earthquake in the Hum capital of Ston, the Orthodox bishop of Hum relocated to the church of St. Peter and St Paul built on the Lim River near the Serbian border in the 1250s.

Regnal titles
Political offices
Preceded by Andrija as Prince	Lord of Hum; 1254	Vacant Title next held by Nikola Vojin
Preceded by ?	Lord of Imotski; 1254	Vacant Title next held by ?
