= Zachlumia =

Medieval Balkan principality

Principality of Zachlumia Захумље Zahumlje
- 9th century–1054
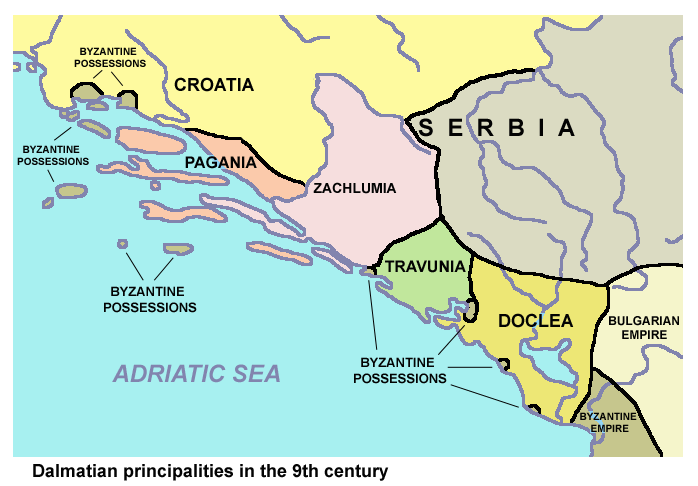
- Zachlumia in 9th century
- Religion: Christianity
- Government: Monarchy
- Prince
  - 910–935: Michael (first known)
  - 1039–1054: Ljutovid (last independent)
- History
  - Established: 9th century
  - Conquered by Duklja: 1054
Preceded by	Succeeded by
Principality of Serbia; Byzantine Empire	Duklja
- Today part of: Croatia; Bosnia and Herzegovina

Zachlumia or Zachumlia (Serbo-Croatian: Zahumlje / Захумље, pronounced [zǎxuːmʎe]), also Hum, was a medieval principality located in the modern-day regions of Herzegovina and southern Dalmatia (today parts of Bosnia and Herzegovina and Croatia, respectively). In some periods it was a fully independent or semi-independent South Slavic principality. It maintained relations with various foreign and neighbouring powers (Byzantine Empire, First Bulgarian Empire, Kingdom of Croatia, Principality of Serbia) and later was subjected (temporarily or for a longer period) to Kingdom of Hungary, Kingdom of Serbia, Kingdom of Bosnia, and at the end to the Ottoman Empire.

== Etymology ==
Zachlumia is a derivative of Hum, from Proto-Slavic *xŭlmŭ, borrowed from a Germanic language (cf. Proto-Germanic *hulma-), meaning "Hill". South Slavic Zahumlje is named after the mountain of Hum (za + Hum "behind the Hum"), above Bona, at the mouth of the Buna. The principality is named Zahumlje or Hum in Serbo-Croatian (Serbian Cyrillic: Захумље, Хум). It is Zachlumia in Latin, Хлъмъ in Old Church Slavonic, and Ζαχλούμων χώρα ("land of Zachlumians") in Greek. The names Chelmania, Chulmia and terra de Chelmo appear in later Latin and Italian chronicles.

== Geography ==
De Administrando Imperio described the polity of Zachlumia as: "From Ragusa begins the domain of the Zachlumi (Ζαχλοῦμοι) and stretches along as far as the river Orontius: and on the side of the coast it is neighbour to the Pagani, but on the side of the mountain country it is neighbour to the Croats on the north and to Serbia at the front ... Those who live there now, Zachlumi, are Serbs, from the time of that prince who claimed the protection of the Emperor Heraclius. In the territory of the Zachlumi are the inhabited cities of Stagnon, Mokriskik, Iosli, Galoumainik, Dobriskik".

The Chronicle of the Priest of Duklja (14th or 16th century) described the geography under the rule of the South Slavic ("Red Croatia") rulers, Hum had two major cities: Bona and Hum. The main settlements in Zachlumia were Ston, Ošlje, Dobar, the towns of Mokriskik and Glumainik. The principality sprang from Dalmatia (Croatia) to the northwest and Pagania to the west; to the mountain of Kalinovik and the Gatačko polje, where it bordered Travunia. The eastern border of Zahumlje went along the line Popovo-Ljubinje-Dabar and met with the Travunian border at the city of Ragusa. Zachlumia was split on 9 zhupanates: Ston, Popovo, Dubrava, Luka, Dabar, Žapska, Gorička and Večenik around Neretva. Zahumlje had access to the Adriatic Sea with the Pelješac peninsula and faced Serbia northwards.

== Slavic settlement ==
Slavs invaded Balkans during Justinian I (r. 527–565), when eventually up to 100,000 Slavs raided Thessalonica. The Western Balkans was settled with Sclaveni (Sklavenoi), the east with Antes. The Sklavenoi plundered Thrace in 545, and again the next year. In 551, the Slavs crossed Niš initially headed for Thessalonica, but ended up in Dalmatia. In 577 some 100,000 Slavs poured into Thrace and Illyricum, pillaging cities and settling down. Hum had also a large number of Vlachs who were descendent from a pre-Slavic population. Related to Romanians and originally speaking a language related to Romanian, the Vlachs of what was Hum are today Slavic speaking.

== History ==
=== 7th century ===
In the second decade of the 7th century, the Avars and their Slavic subjects occupied most of the Byzantine province of Dalmatia, including the territory of what would become Zahumlje, sacking towns and enslaving or displacing the local population. Some of the Slavs and Avars might have permanently settled in the occupied areas. They attacked Constantinople in 626 but were defeated by the Byzantines, after which the Avars ceased to play a significant role in the Balkans.

Around 630, during the reign of Byzantine Emperor Heraclius, Serbs and Croats (Slavic tribes) led by their respective aristocracies entered the western Balkans from the north, which was approved by the emperor. They inhabited areas that had been devastated by the Avars, where Byzantium (East Roman Empire) had generally been reduced to only nominal rule. According to DAI, Zahumlje was one of the regions settled by the Serbs from an area near Thessaloniki who previously arrived there from White Serbia, but a closer reading of the source suggests that the Constantine VII's consideration about the population's ethnic identity is based on Serbian political rule and influence during the time of Časlav of Serbia and does not indicate ethnic origin. According to Noel Malcolm, today's western Serbia was area where Serbs settled in 7th century and from there they expanded their rule on territory of Zachlumia. According to Tibor Živković the area of the Vistula where the Litziki ancestors of Michael of Zahumlje originate was the place where White Croats would be expected and not White Serbs, and it's unclear whether the Zachlumians "in the migration period to the Balkans really were Serbs or Croats or Slavic tribes which in alliance with Serbs or Croats arrived in the Balkans". According to Francis Dvornik the Zachlumians "had a closer bond of interest with the Croats than with the Serbs, since they seem to have migrated to their new home not with the Serbs, but with the Croats". Michael's tribal origin is related to the oral tradition from Historia Salonitana by Thomas the Archdeacon about seven or eight tribes of nobles called Lingones who arrived from Poland and settled in Croatia. Much of Dalmatia was sometime earlier settled by the Croats, and Zahumlje bordered their territory on the north. According to Thomas the Archdeacon, when describing the reign of Croatian king Stephen Držislav in the late 10th century, notes that Duchy of Hum (Zachlumia or Chulmie) was a part of the Kingdom of Croatia, before and after Stjepan Držislav:

"Istaque fuerunt regni eorum confinia: ab oriente Delmina, ubi fuit civitas Delmis, ... ab occidente Carinthia, versus mare usque ad oppidum Stridonis, quod nunc est confinium Dalmatie et Ystrie; ab aquilone vero a ripa Danubii usque ad mare Dalmaticum cum tota Maronia et Chulmie ducatu."

"The boundaries of that kingdom were as follows. To the east: Delmina. ... To the west: Carinthia, towards the sea up to the town of Stridon, which now marks the boundary between Dalmatia and Istria. To the north, moreover: from the banks of the Danube down to the Dalmatian sea, including all of Maronia and the Duchy of Hum."

— Thomas the Archdeacon.

=== 9th century ===
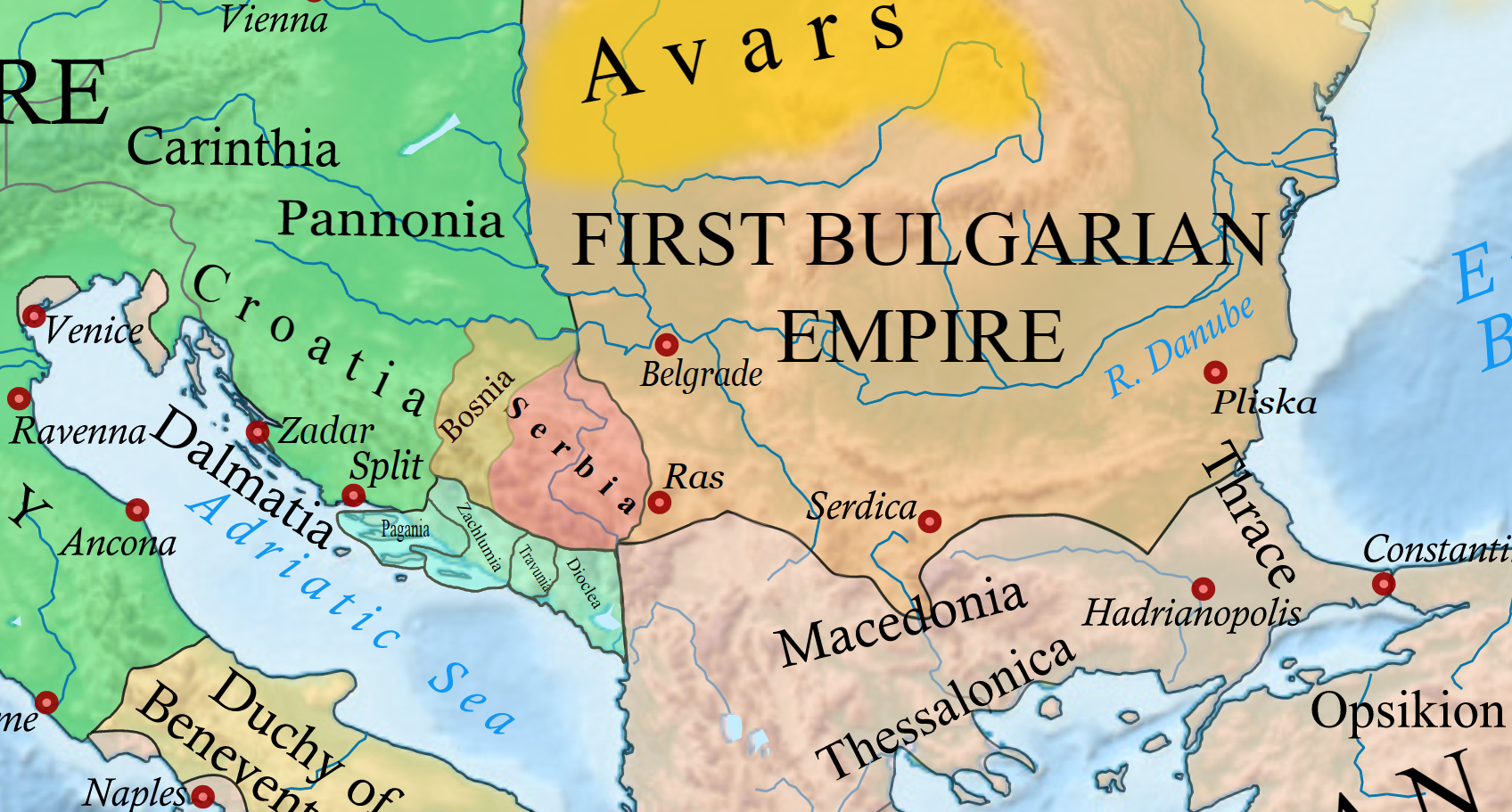
Slavic principalities in ca. 814 AD.

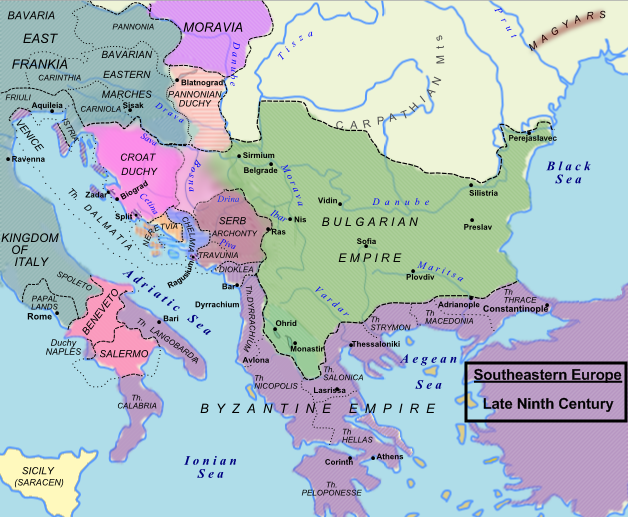
Slavic principalities in ca. 850 AD.

Charlemagne, King of the Franks from 768 until his death in 814, expanded the Frankish kingdom into an empire (800) that incorporated much of western and central Europe. He brought the Frankish state face to face with the West Slavs to the northeast and the Avars and South Slavs to the southeast of the Frankish empire. Dalmatia which was southeast of the Frankish empire, was chiefly in the hands of South Slavic tribes. North of Dubrovnik these came to be under Croatian župans (princes) and eventually came to consider themselves Croatians, while many of those to the south of Dubrovnik were coming to consider themselves Serbs. Despite Frankish overlordship, the Franks had almost no role in Dalmatia (Dalmatian Croatia and Zahumlje) in the period from the 820s through 840s.

In 866, a major Arab raid along Dalmatia struck Budva and Kotor, and then laid siege to Dubrovnik in 867. The city of Dubrovnik appealed to Byzantine Emperor Basil the Macedonian, who responded by sending over one hundred ships. Finally, the 866–867 Saracens' siege of Dubrovnik, which lasted fifteen months, was raised due to the intervention of Basil I, who sent a fleet under the command of Niketas Oryphas in relief of the city. After this successful intervention, the Byzantine navy sailed along the coast collecting promises of loyalty to the empire from the Dalmatian cities. At this moment the local Slavic tribes (in Zahumlje, Travunija, and Konavle), who had aided the intervention, also accepted Byzantine suzerainty. Afterwards, the Slavs of Dalmatia and Zahumlje took part in the Byzantine military actions against the Arabs in Bari in 870–871. The Roman cities in Dalmatia had long been pillaged by the Slavic tribes in the mountaines around them. Basil I allowed the towns to pay tribute to the Slavic tribes to reduce the Slavs raiding. Presumably a large portion of this tribute went to the prince of Dalmatian Croatia. In late 870s, the theme of Dalmatia ("thema Dalmatias") was established, but with no real Byzantine authority. These small cities in the region (also Dyrrachium) did not stretch into the hinterlands, and had none military capacity, thus Basil I paid a tax of '72 gold coins' to the princes of Zahumlje and Travunia.

In 879, the Pope asked for help from duke Zdeslav Trpimirović for an armed escort for his delegates across southern Dalmatia and Zahumlje. Later in 880, the Pope ask the same from Zdeslav's successor, prince Branimir.

=== 10th century ===
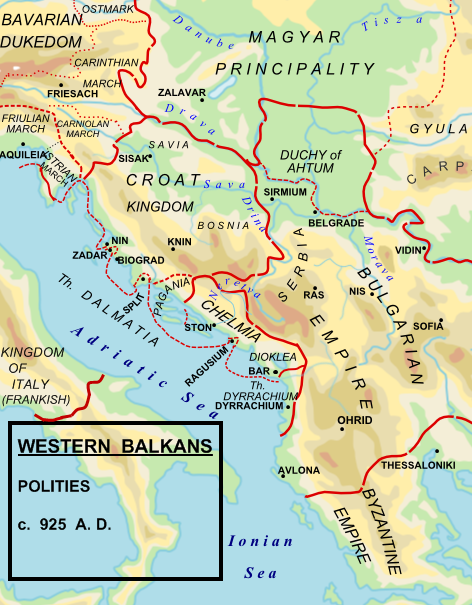
Map of Michael's territorial extent over Chelmia (Zahumlje), between the Kingdom of Croatia and the Bulgarian Empire.

The history of Zahumlje as a greater political entity starts with the emerging of Michael of Zahumlje, an independent South Slavic ruler who flourished in the early part of the 10th century. A neighbour of Croatian Kingdom and Principality of Serbia as well as an ally of Bulgaria, he was nevertheless able to maintain independent rule throughout at least a good part of his reign.

Michael have come into territorial conflict with the neighbouring prince Peter Gojniković, the ruler of inner Serbia, who was extending his power westwards. To eliminate that threat and as a close ally of Bulgaria, Michael warned the Bulgarian Tsar Simeon I about the alliance between Peter and Symeon's enemy, the Byzantine Empire. In 912 Michael kidnapped the Venetian Doge's son Peter Badoari that was returning to Venice from Constantinople and sent him to Czar Simeon as a sign of loyalty. Symeon attacked inner Serbia and captured Peter, who later died in prison, and Michael was able to restore the majority of control.

The Historia Salonitana maior, whose composition may have begun in the late 13th century, cites a letter of Pope John X to Tomislav, "king (rex) of the Croats", in which he refers to the first council in some detail. If the letter is authentic, it shows that the council was attended not only by the bishops of Croatian and Byzantine Dalmatia, but also by Tomislav, whose territory also included the Byzantine cities of Dalmatia, and by a number of Michael's representatives. Zahumlje may have been under Croatian influence, but remained a separate political entity. Both Zahumlje and Croatia were under the religious jurisdiction of the Archbishopric of Split. In this letter, John describes Michael as "the most excellent leader of the Zachlumi" (excellentissimus dux Chulmorum), and is mentioned the Ston bishopric (ecclesia Stagnensis) which jurisdiction remained under Split until 1022. It is uncertain whether the inscription and depiction of a Slavic ruler in the Church of St. Michael in Ston is a reference to Michael of Zahumlje, the 11th century Mihailo I of Duklja or St. Michael himself.

After the Italian city of Siponto (Latin: Sipontum) was heavily jeopardized by the raiding Arabs and Langobards, Mihailo won a magnificent military victory by taking the city upon the recommendations from Constantinople and orders from his ally, King Tomislav Trpimirovic, but didn't keep it permanently. Mihailo Višević entered into closer relations with the Byzantine Empire, after the death of Bulgaria's Tsar Simeon. He gained the grand titles of the Byzantine court as anthypatos and patrician (patrikios). He remained as ruler of Zahumlje into the 940s, while maintaining good relations with the Papacy.

==== Post-Michael of Zahumlje period ====
After the death of Michael (after c. 930s or 940s), the fate of Zahumlje is uncertain due to lack of historical sources about it. Some historians believe that Zahumlje came under the rule of prince Časlav of Serbia, but there's no evidence for it and DAI which was written in the mid-10th century clearly states that Zachlumia is a separate polity from Serbia. The 13th century Thomas the Archdeacon claimed that the Croatian kingdom included Zachlumia before and after Stephen Držislav (969–997), but that's also disputable.

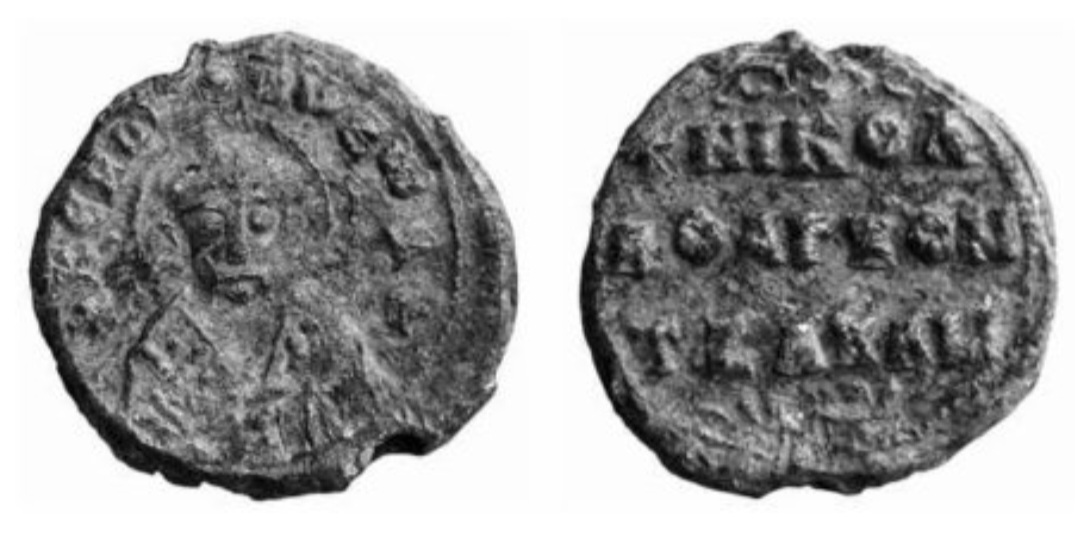
Seal of Archon Nikola

In 2018, excavations at Oricum in southern Albania uncovered a 22 mm lead bulla of a certain Nikola, titled archon of Zahumlje. Published and dated to the last quarter of the 10th century by the French historian Vivien Prigent. This is the only known historical reference to this ruler of Zachlumia. Prigent suggests that the archon Nikola may have been identical with the Zahumlje-Travunia prince Dragimir, from the Chronicle of the Priest of Duklja, and thus mentioned on the seal under his Christian name.

In the late 990s, Bulgarian Tsar Samuel made client states out of most of the Balkans, including Duklja and Zahumlje. In 998, Samuel launched a major campaign against Jovan Vladimir to prevent a Byzantine-Serbian alliance, resulting in a surrender. The Bulgarian troops proceeded to pass through Dalmatia, taking control of Kotor and journeying to Dubrovnik. Although they failed to take Dubrovnik, they devastated the surrounding villages. The Bulgarian army then attacked Croatia in support of the rebel princes Krešimir III and Gojslav and advanced northwest as far as Split, Trogir and Zadar, then northeast through Bosnia and Raška and returned to Bulgaria.

=== 11th century ===
By 1020, Byzantine Emperor Basil I expanded control in the whole region, but the Byzantines used local elite to rule over local polities although under Byzantine vassalage and supervision of Byzantine officials. In the Pope Benedict VIII's bull from 27 September 1022 is mentioned Zahumlje kingdom (regno Lachomis), and would be again in the bull of Pope Gregory VII from 1076 (as regno Zaculmi), which confirmed the jurisdiction of the archdiocese of Dubrovnik.

In a charter dated July 1039, Ljutovid of Zahumlje who was an independent Slavic ruler of Zahumlje, styled himself "Ljutovit, protospatharios epi tou Chrysotriklinou, hypatos, strategos" of Serbia and Zahumlje. According to historian Paul Stephenson, it "suggests that he had been courted by the emperor, and awarded nominal rights neighbouring lands, including Duklja, which was at the time at war with the empire.

According to historical sources, the Serbian lands were under Byzantine control or vassalage until 1040s, but not under a direct control. Vojislav of Duklja (fl. 1018–1043) soon took Zahumlje from the Byzantines. During the rule of Constantine Bodin (r. 1081–1101), neither Bosnia, Serbia nor Zahumlje was ever integrated into Doclea, each retained its own nobility and institutions and simply acquired a Vojislavljević to head the local structure as Prince or Duke. Zahumlje subsequently became part of the Grand Principality of Serbia.

=== 12th century ===
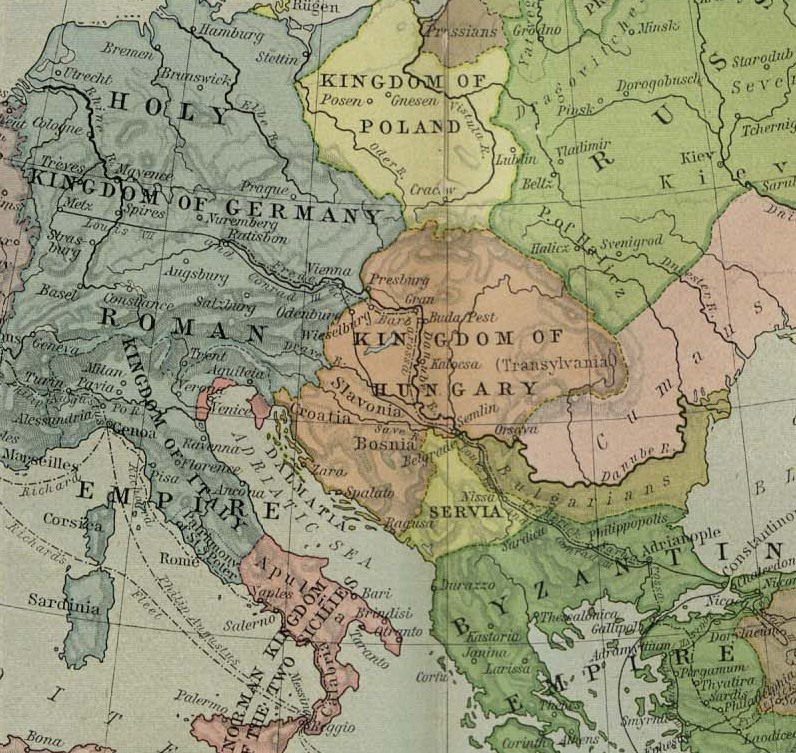
Zahumlje in 1190 as a lower part of Kingdom of Hungary

Kočapar, the Prince of Duklja (r. 1102–1103), ruled in the name of Vukan I of Serbia. There was a split between the two, and Vukan sent forces to Duklja, making Kočapar flee to Bosnia and then Zahumlje, where he died. Zavida ruled Zahumlje before getting into a conflict with his brothers, resulting in him being exiled to Duklja, where he would have the title of Lord of Ribnica. Grand Princes Desa (r. 1148–1162) and Uroš II Prvoslav ruled Serbia together 1149–1153; Desa had the title of 'Prince of Duklja, Travunija and Zahumlje', mentioned in 1150 and 1151.

About 1150, the Byzantine Emperor Manuel I Komnenos displeased with king Radoslav of Duklja, divided up his lands between princes of the old Serbian family of Zavida, and Stefan Nemanja secured the land of Hum. After 1168 when Nemanja was raised to the Serbian throne with Manuel's favor, Hum passed to his brother Miroslav. He married a sister of Ban Kulin, who in meantime acquired the throne of Bosnia. The subjects of Miroslav and Kulin included both Catholic and Orthodox. Prince Miroslav himself was Orthodox. In meantime, both Bosnia and Hum had been fought between Kingdom of Hungary and Byzantine Empire. The Catholics supported the former and the Orthodox the latter. A support of the growing heresy seemed the best solution for both Kulin and Miroslav.

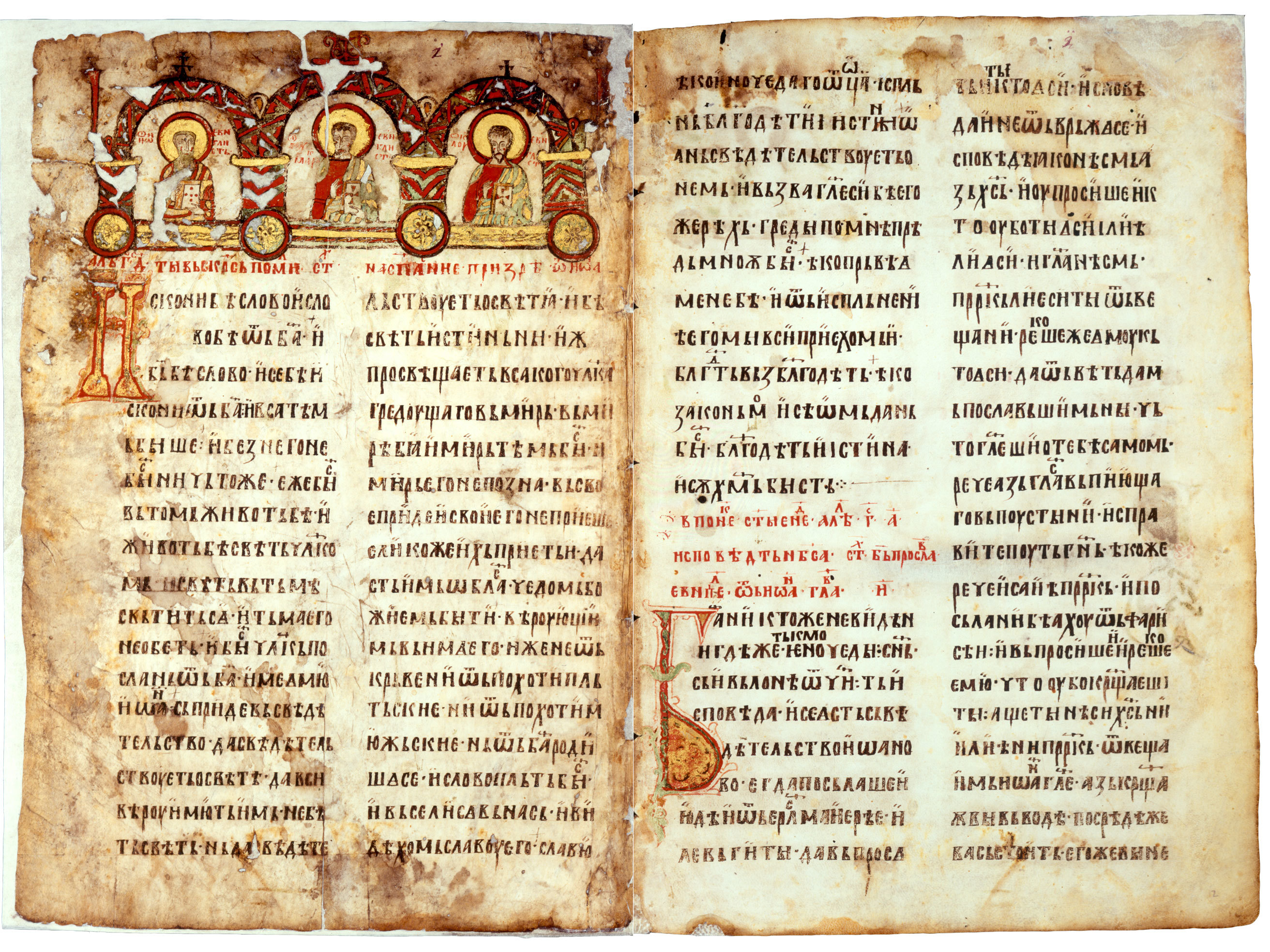
Miroslav Gospel, one of the oldest surviving documents written in Serbian recension of Old Church Slavonic, was created by order by prince Miroslav of Hum

Following the death of Emperor Manuel in 1180 Miroslav started ecclesiastical superior of Hum. He refused to allow Rainer, Latin Archbishop of Spalato (Split) whom he considered to be an agent of Hungarian king, to consecrate a bishop for the town of Ston. In addition, Miroslav confiscated the Archbishop's money. Rainer complained to the Pope Alexander III, who sent Teobald to report on the matter. The Pope's nuncio Teobald found Miroslav as a patron of heretics. After this, the Pope wrote to king Béla III of Hungary who was overlord of Hum (which Miroslav did not recognize), telling him to see that Miroslav performed his duty, but Miroslav remained as Prince of Hum. In 1190–1192, Stefan Nemanja briefly assigned the rule of Hum to his son Rastko Nemanjić, while Miroslav held the Lim region with Bijelo Polje. Rastko however took monastic vows and Miroslav continued ruling Hum after 1192.

Latin vengeance came in March 1198, when Andrew II of Hungary become the prince of Dalmatia, Croatia and Hum, while Miroslav died a year after and his wife was living in exile. The Miroslav Gospels are the oldest surviving documents written in Serbian recension of Old Church Slavonic, very likely produced for the Church of St Peter in Lima, commissioned by prince Miroslav.

=== 13th century ===
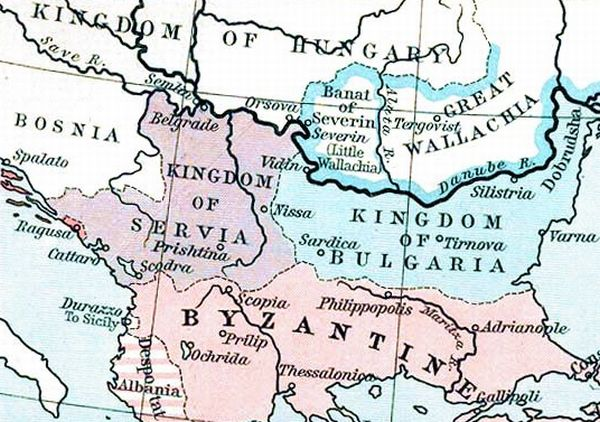
Part of Zahumlje under Medieval Serbian Kingdom in 1265

Until beginning of the 13th century, areas of Zahumlje were under jurisdiction of the Roman Church. When Sava became the first archbishop of Serbia in 1219, he appointed Ilarion as the Orthodox bishop of Hum.

Andrija Mirosavljević is entitled the rule of Hum, but the Hum nobility chose his brother Petar. Andrija is exiled to Rascia, to the court of his cousin Grand Prince Stefan Nemanjić. In the meantime, Petar fought successfully with neighbouring Bosnia and Croatia. Stefan Nemanjić sided with Andrija and went to war and secured Hum and Popovo field for Andrija sometime after his accession. Petar was defeated and crossed the Neretva, continuing to rule the west and north of the Neretva, which had around 1205 been briefly occupied by Andrew II of Hungary. Toljen II, the son of Toljen Mirosavljević, succeeded as prince, ruling 1227–1237. Andrija's sons Bogdan, Radoslav and George succeed as princes of Hum in 1249, Radoslav held the supreme rule. During the war against Ragusa, he aided his kinsman Stephen Uroš I of Serbia, at the same time swearing allegiance to Béla IV of Hungary. Following an earthquake in the Hum capital of Ston, the Serbian Orthodox bishop of Hum moved to the church of St Peter and St Paul built on the Lim River near the Serbian border in the 1250s.

Radoslav of Zahumlje was from 1254 a vassal of Hungary, but probably afterwards his land were absorbed into Serbia. However, he was at war with Serbia in 1268, while still under Hungarian suzerainty. But seeking to centralize his realm, Stephen Uroš I of Serbia tried to stamp out regional differences by dropping references to Zahumlje (Hum), Trebinje and Duklja (Zeta), and called himself "King of all Serbian land and the Coast". Miroslav's descendants dropped to the level of other local nobles.

=== 14th century ===
Paul I Šubić of Bribir as Ban of Croatia and Dalmatia controlled Croatia from Gvozd Mountain to the river Neretva mouth. Paul became Lord of all of Bosnia in 1299. Although supporting the king, Paul continued to act independently, and ruled over a large portion of modern-day Croatia and Bosnia. In the course of the war between Stephen Uroš II Milutin and Stephen Dragutin, Paul Šubić in 1301–1303 expanded not only into western Hum, but also beyond the Neretva river, and took the region of Nevesinje and Ston. He also fought over Kotor and its surroundings, but without further territorial gains. In 1304 Paul appointed his eldest son, Mladen II, as Lord of Hum, and administrative governorship positions were granted to his vassals Konstantin (until 1307) and Izan Nelipčić (1307–1313). Mladen succeeded his father in 1312, and as part of Hungarian-Italian initiative, and with Milutin and Dragutin concluding a peace between themselves, began a new war in eastern Zachlumia. The initial Mladen's success, was soon followed by Milutin's capture of Mladen's brother, and to get him back Mladen Šubić had to agree to restore eastern Hum to Milutin. After this agreement in 1313 the Neretva again became the border between eastern and western Hum.

By 1325, the Branivojević family had emerged as strongest in Hum. Probably at their highest point they ruled from Cetina River to the town of Kotor. Though nominal vassals of Serbia, the Branivojević family attacked Serbian interests and other local nobles of Hum, who in 1326 turned against Serbia and Branivojević family. The Hum nobles approached to Stjepan Kotromanić II, the ban of Bosnia, who then annexed most of Hum. The Draživojevići of Nevesinje as vassals of Bosnian Ban, become the leading family of Hum in the 1330s. Because of the war in 1327–1328 between Serbia and Dubrovnik, Bosnian lordship of inner Hum and the war in Macedonia, Stephen Uroš IV Dušan sold Ston and Pelješac to Dubrovnik, and turned to the east to acquire all of Macedonia.

The region was overwhelmed by the House of Kotromanić from Bosnia in 1322–1326. By the mid-14th century, Bosnia apparently reached a peak under Ban Tvrtko I who came into power in 1353.

=== 15th century ===
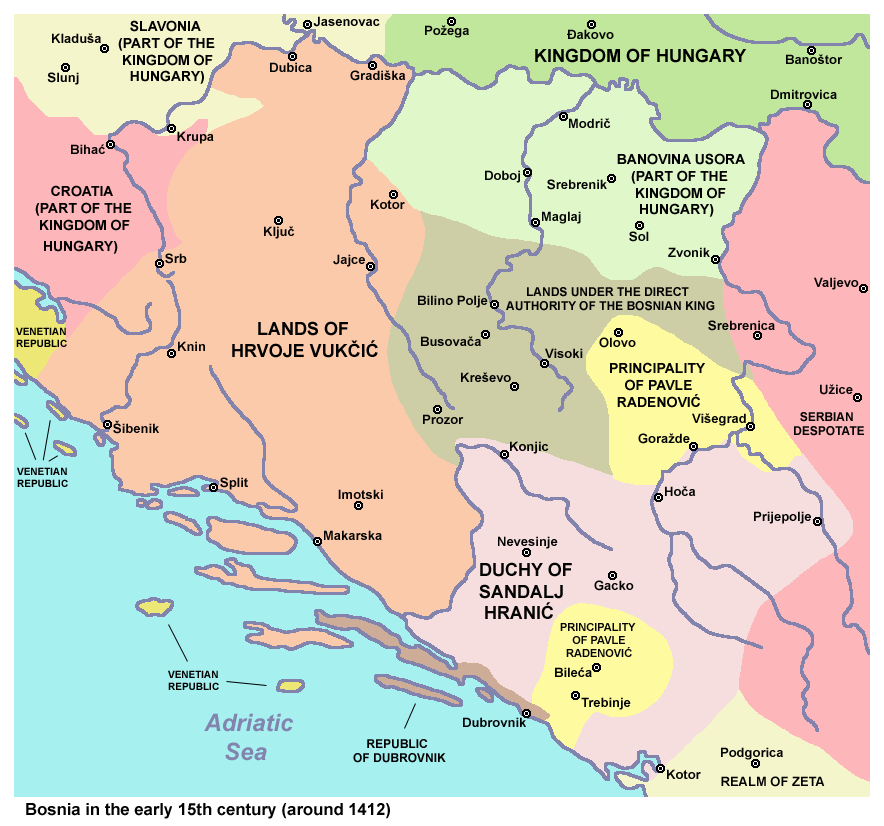
Zemljas in the Kingdom of Bosnia around 1412

In the beginning of the 15th century, Hrvoje Vukčić Hrvatinić ruled over the western Hum, and Sandalj Hranić Kosača ruled over its eastern part, while the Neretva river remain a border between their possessions.

The territory on the right bank of the Lower Neretva was at the time controlled by Kosača vassals, a local clan and magnates of Radivojević–Jurjević–Vlatković.

Bosnian regional lord Stjepan Vukčić Kosača ruled over Zahumlje, or Humska zemlja as it was called at this point. In 1448 he assumed the title herzog and styled himself Herzog of Hum and the Coast, Grand Duke of Bosnia, Knyaz of Drina, and the rest, and since 1450, Herzog of Saint Sava, Lord of Hum, Grand Duke of Bosnia, Knyaz of Drina, and the rest. This "Saint Sava" part of the title had considerable public relations value, because Sava's relics were consider miracle-working by people of all Christian faiths. Stjepan's title will prompt the Ottomans to start calling Humska zemlja by using the possessive form of the noun Herceg, Herceg's land(s) (Herzegovina), which remains a long-lasting legacy in the name of Bosnia and Herzegovina to this day.

In 1451 he attacked Dubrovnik, and laid siege to the city. He had earlier been made a Ragusan nobleman and, consequently, the Ragusan government now proclaimed him a traitor. A reward of 15,000 ducats, a palace in Dubrovnik worth 2,000 ducats, and an annual income of 300 ducats was offered to anyone who would kill him, along with the promise of hereditary Ragusan nobility which also helped hold this promise to whoever did the deed. Stjepan was so scared by the threat that he finally raised the siege.

== Demographics ==
=== 12th–13th centuries ===
Most of Hum's territory was inhabited by Slavs, and Vlachs, and belonged to the Eastern Church after the Great Schism. Hum's coastal region, including its capital Ston, had a mixed population of Catholics and Orthodox.

=== 14th–15th centuries ===
In contrast to Bosnia, where Roman Catholicism and Bosnian Church were firmly established, eastern parts of Hum was mostly Orthodox, from 13th century and the rise of Nemanjići. In the 14th- and 15th centuries, there was an influx of settlers from the župa of Trebinje, around forts Klobuk, Ledenica and Rudina, and the Hum lands around Gacko and Dabar, to Kotor. The people from Hum were mostly girls from Gacko, who took up working as servants to wealthy families.

== List of rulers ==
- Michael of Zahumlje, independent Slavic ruler of Zahumlje, Prince of Zahumlje 910–940
- Stephen Držislav of Croatia, King of Croatia 969–997
- Dragimir, Prince of Travunia and Zachlumia; before 1000–1018
- Part of Byzantine Empire: 1018–1039
- Ljutovid, Prince of Hum 1039–1054
- Mihailo Vojislavljević, Prince, and King of Duklja 1054–1081
- Bodin Vojislavljević, King of Duklja 1081–1101
- Vladimir II of Duklja, King of Duklja c. 1103–1113
- George I of Duklja, King of Duklja c. 1113–1118 and 1125–1131
- Desa, Duke of Zahumlje 1149–1162
- Miroslav of Hum Prince of Zahumlje 1162–1190
- Rastko of Nemanja 1190–1192 ruling in the name of Stefan Nemanja
- Miroslav of Hum Prince of Zahumlje 1192
- Toljen of Hum Prince of Zahumlje 1192–1196 (He married a daughter of Duke Berthold von Meran, Margrave of Istria)
- To Hungary 1198–1199
- Petar, son of Miroslav, Duke of Zahumlje 1196–1216 and a count of the city of Split 1222–1225.
- In 1216 Stephen the First-Crowned divided Hum:
  - Mainland of Zachlumia:
    - Stefan Radoslav of Serbia, Prince of Serbia and Zahumlje 1216–1228
    - Toljen II, son of Toljen, Duke of Upper Zahumlje 1228–1239
  - Coastal Zachlumia:
    - Andrija, son of Miroslav, Prince of the Seaside and Duke of Southern Zahumlje 1216–1239
- Union of Zachlumia:
- Andrija, 1239–1250
- Radoslav of Zahumlje, Bogdan I and George I 1249–1252 (brothers, sons of Andrew)
- Radoslav of Zahumlje and George I 1252–1268
- George I 1268–1280
- Bogdan II 1280–1299
- Mladen I Šubić of Bribir, a Croatian noble and Bosnian Ban from 1299 to 1304
- Paul I Šubić of Bribir, a Ban of Croatia and Lord of all of Bosnia from 1304 to 1312
- Mladen II Šubić of Bribir, "Ban the Croats and Bosnia and general lord of Hum country" 1312–1322
- Nikola, Prince of Zahumlje 1322–1326. Son of Bogdan I (or Radoslav). He married Katarina Kotromanić in 1338
- Stjepan Kotromanic II, a Bosnian Ban from 1326 to 1353
- Tvrtko, the first Bosnian King 1353–1391
- Stephen Dabiša of Bosnia 1391–1395
- Helen I 1395–1398
- Stephen Ostoja of Bosnia 1398– 1404
- Stephen Tvrtko II of Bosnia 1404–1409
- Stephen Ostoja of Bosnia (again) 1409–1418
- Sandalj Hranić Kosača, Grand Duke of Hum from 1418 to 1435
- Stjepan Vukčić Kosača (1435–1466) was Bosnian noble. In 1448. changed his title from "Vojvode of Bosnia" into "Herceg [Duke] of Hum and the Coast", and from 1449 into "Herceg of Saint Sava".
- Vlatko Hercegović from 1466 to 1481

== Legacy ==
The historical name of the region is officially represented in the name of the Eparchy of Zahumlje and Herzegovina of the Serbian Orthodox Church. Also, the honorific title Grand Voivode (Duke) of Zahumlije has been granted at times to junior members of the Petrović-Njegoš dynasty that ruled in Montenegro until 1918. The last grand duke of Zahumlije was Prince Peter of Montenegro, who died in 1932.

== See also ==
- History of Bosnia and Herzegovina
- History of Dalmatia
- History of Croatia
- History of Serbia

== Sources ==
- Bataković, Dušan T. (1996). The Serbs of Bosnia & Herzegovina: History and Politics. Paris: Dialogue. ISBN 9782911527104.
- Ćirković, Sima (1964a). Herceg Stefan Vukčić-Kosača i njegovo doba [Herceg Stefan Vukčić-Kosača and his time] (in Serbian). Naučno delo SANU. OCLC 4864621.
- Ćirković, Sima (1964). Историја средњовековне босанске државе [History of the medieval Bosnian state] (in Serbian). Srpska književna zadruga. OCLC 494551997.
- Ćirković, Sima (2004). The Serbs. Malden: Blackwell Publishing. ISBN 9780631204718.
- Thomas of Split (2006). Karbić, Damir; Matijević Sokol, Mirjana; Perić, Olga; Sweeney, James Ross (eds.). History of the Bishops of Salona and Split: Historia salonitanorum atque spalatinorum pontificum. Budapest: Central European University Press. ISBN 9789637326592.
- Moravcsik, Gyula, ed. (1967) [1949]. Constantine Porphyrogenitus: De Administrando Imperio (2nd revised ed.). Washington D.C.: Dumbarton Oaks Center for Byzantine Studies. ISBN 9780884020219.
- Dvornik, F.; Jenkins, R. J. H.; Lewis, B.; Moravcsik, Gy.; Obolensky, D.; Runciman, S. (1962). P. J. H. Jenkins (ed.). De Administrando Imperio: Volume II. Commentary. University of London: The Athlone Press.
- Dzino, Danijel (2023). Early Medieval Hum and Bosnia, ca. 450–1200: Beyond Myths. Taylor & Francis. ISBN 9781000893434.
- Curta, Florin (2006). Southeastern Europe in the Middle Ages, 500–1250. Cambridge: Cambridge University Press.
- Fine, John Van Antwerp Jr. (1975). The Bosnian Church: A New Interpretation: A Study of the Bosnian Church and Its Place in State and Society from the 13th to the 15th Centuries. Boulder: East European Quarterly. ISBN 9780914710035.
- Fine, John Van Antwerp Jr. (1991) [1983]. The Early Medieval Balkans: A Critical Survey from the Sixth to the Late Twelfth Century. Ann Arbor, Michigan: University of Michigan Press. ISBN 0472081497.
- Fine, John Van Antwerp Jr. (1994) [1987]. The Late Medieval Balkans: A Critical Survey from the Late Twelfth Century to the Ottoman Conquest. Ann Arbor, Michigan: University of Michigan Press. ISBN 0472082604.
- Fine, John Van Antwerp Jr. (2005). When Ethnicity Did Not Matter in the Balkans: A Study of Identity in Pre-Nationalist Croatia, Dalmatia, and Slavonia in the Medieval and Early-Modern Periods. Ann Arbor, Michigan: University of Michigan Press. ISBN 0472025600.
- Fleming, Thomas (2002). Montenegro: The Divided Land. Rockford, Illinois: Chronicles Press. ISBN 9780961936495.
- Hupchick, Dennis P. (2002). The Balkans: From Constantinople to Communism. New York: Palgrave. ISBN 9780312217365.
- Hupchick, Dennis P. (2017). The Bulgarian-Byzantine Wars for Early Medieval Balkan Hegemony: Silver-Lined Skulls and Blinded Armies. New York: Springer. ISBN 9783319562063.
- Janković, Đorđe (2004). "The Slavs in the 6th Century North Illyricum". Гласник Српског археолошког друштва. 20: 39–61.
- John the Deacon, Chronicon Venetum, ed. G. H. Pertz (1846). Monumenta Germaniae Historica: Scriptores 7. Hanover. pp. 1–36: 22–3. Archived from the original on 19 July 2011. A later edition is that by G. Monticolo (1890), Rome: Forzani. The relevant passage is also found in Rački, F. (1877). Documenta historiae chroaticae periodum antiquam illustrantia. Zagreb: Zagrabiae, Sumptibus Academiae Scientiarum et Artium. pp. 388 (no. 197.1 ).
- Karbić, Damir (2004). "Šubići Bribirski do gubitka nasljedne banske časti (1322.)" [The Šubići of Bribir until the Loss of the Hereditary Position of the Croatian Ban (1322)]. Historical Contributions (in Croatian). 22. Zagreb, Croatia: Croatian Academy of Sciences and Arts: 1–26.
- Klaić, Nada (1989). Srednjovjekovna Bosna: Politički položaj bosanskih vladara do Tvrtkove krunidbe (1377. g.). Zagreb: Grafički zavod Hrvatske. ISBN 9788639901042.
- Кунчер, Драгана (2009). Gesta Regum Sclavorum: Критичко издање и превод (PDF). Vol. 1. Београд-Никшић: Историјски институт, Манастир Острог. Archived from the original on 14 July 2024.
- Luttwak, Edward N. (2009). The Grand Strategy of the Byzantine Empire. Harvard University Press. ISBN 9780674035195.
- Malcolm, Noel (1995). Povijest Bosne: kratki pregled. Erasmus Gilda: Novi Liber. ISBN 953-6045-03-6. Archived from the original on 6 April 2023.
- Norris, H.T. (1993). Islam in the Balkans: religion and society between Europe and the Arab world. University of South Carolina Press. ISBN 978-0-87249-977-5.
- Ostrogorsky, George (1956). History of the Byzantine State. Oxford: Basil Blackwell.
- Prigent, Vivien (2019). "Bulles de plomb inédites pour l'histoire d'Orikos médiéval" (PDF). SLSA Jahresbericht 2018. Zürich: Schweizerisch-Liechtensteinische Stiftung für archäologische Forschungen im Ausland. pp. 135–161. Archived from the original on 26 April 2026.
- Rački, Franjo (1861). Odlomci iz državnoga práva hrvatskoga za narodne dynastie. Beč: Klemm.
- Ross, James Bruce (1945). "Two Neglected Paladins of Charlemagne: Erich of Friuli and Gerold of Bavaria". Speculum. 20 (2): 212–235. doi:10.2307/2854596. JSTOR 2854596. S2CID 163300685.
- Runciman, Steven (1982). The Medieval Manichee: A Study of the Christian Dualist Heresy. Cambridge University Press. ISBN 9780521289269.
- Runciman, Steven (1988). The Emperor Romanus Lecapenus and His Reign: A Study of Tenth-Century Byzantium. Cambridge University Press. ISBN 9780521357227.
- Samardžić, Radovan; Duškov, Milan, eds. (1993). Serbs in European Civilization. Belgrade: Nova, Serbian Academy of Sciences and Arts, Institute for Balkan Studies. ISBN 9788675830153.
- Sedlar, Jean W. (1994). East Central Europe in the Middle Ages, 1000-1500. Seattle: University of Washington Press. ISBN 9780295800646.
- Stephenson, Paul (2003). The Legend of Basil the Bulgar-Slayer. Cambridge: Cambridge University Press. ISBN 9780521815307.
- Stephenson, Paul (2004). Byzantium's Balkan Frontier: A Political Study of the Northern Balkans, 900–1204. Cambridge: Cambridge University Press. ISBN 9780521770170.
- Stoianovich, Traian (1994). Balkan worlds: the first and last Europe. M.E. Sharpe. ISBN 978-1-56324-033-1.
- Тошић, Ђуро (2005). "Требињци и Захумљани у средњовјековном Котору". Истраживања: Филозофски факултет у Новом Саду. 16: 221–227.
- Uzelac, Aleksandar (2018). "Prince Michael of Zahumlje – a Serbian ally of tsar Symeon" (PDF). Emperor Symeon's Bulgaria in the History of Europe's South-East: 1100 years from the Battle of Achelous. Vol. 1. София: St Kliment Ohridski University Press. pp. 236–245. Archived from the original on 26 August 2025.
- Vego, Marko (1982). Postanak srednjovjekovne bosanske države [The becoming of the medieval Bosnian state] (in Serbo-Croatian). Sarajevo: Svjetlost. OCLC 461824314.
- Velikonja, Mitja (2003). Religious Separation and Political Intolerance in Bosnia-Herzegovina. College Station: Texas A&M University Press. ISBN 9781585442263.
- Viator (1978). Medieval and Renaissance Studies. University of California Press. ISBN 978-0-520-03608-6.
- Vlasto, Alexis P. (1970). The Entry of the Slavs into Christendom: An Introduction to the Medieval History of the Slavs. Cambridge: Cambridge University Press. ISBN 9780521074599.
- Zlatar, Zdenko (2007). The poetics of Slavdom: the mythopoeic foundations of Yugoslavia. Peter Lang. ISBN 978-0-8204-8135-7.
- Шишић, Фердо, ed. (1928). Летопис Попа Дукљанина. Београд-Загреб: Српска краљевска академија.
- Živković, Tibor (2006). Портрети српских владара: IX-XII век [Portraits of Serbian Rulers: IX-XII Century] (in Serbian). Београд: Завод за уџбенике и наставна средства. ISBN 9788617137548.
- Živković, Tibor (2008). Forging unity: The South Slavs between East and West 550-1150. Belgrade: The Institute of History, Čigoja štampa. ISBN 9788675585732.
- Живковић, Тибор (2009). Gesta Regum Sclavorum: Коментар (PDF). Vol. 2. Београд-Никшић: Историјски институт; Манастир Острог.
- Živković, Tibor (2010). "Constantine Porphyrogenitus' Source on the Earliest History of the Croats and Serbs". Radovi Zavoda Za Hrvatsku Povijest U Zagrebu. 42: 117–131.
- Živković, Tibor (2013a). "On the Baptism of the Serbs and Croats in the Time of Basil I (867–886)" (PDF). Studia Slavica et Balcanica Petropolitana (1): 33–53.
- Živković, Tibor (2013b). "The Urban Landcape [sic] of Early Medieval Slavic Principalities in the Territories of the Former Praefectura Illyricum and in the Province of Dalmatia (ca. 610–950)". The World of the Slavs: Studies of the East, West and South Slavs: Civitas, Oppidas, Villas and Archeological Evidence (7th to 11th Centuries AD). Belgrade: The Institute for History. pp. 15–36. ISBN 9788677431044.
