= Luka (župa) =

Coordinates: 43.535°N 17.4457°E

Luka was a župa (administrative division) of the medieval principality of Zahumlje (later Hum) located in parts of Bosnia and Herzegovina, and Croatia. It was situated in a swampy area on both sides of the Neretva river, from the Bregava and the Trebižat, down to the Neretva Delta and Adriatic Sea. It bordered the župas of Rastok (west), Vučerić (north), Drijeva (east) and the Adriatic Sea (south).
