= Toljen of Hum =

Toljen

Prince of Hum (Zahumlje)
- Reign: 1190s
- Predecessor: Miroslav
- Successor: Petar
- Spouse: daughter of Berthold of Andechs
- Issue: Toljen II
- Dynasty: Vukanović
- Father: Miroslav of Hum
- Mother: sister of Ban Kulin
- Religion: Eastern Orthodoxy

Toljen (Serbian Cyrillic: Тољен; fl. 1189) was a Serbian prince (knez), who ruled Hum between 1192–1196, serving his uncle Serbian Grand Prince Stefan Nemanja (r. 1166–1196).

== Life ==
His father was Miroslav of Hum (r. 1166–1190; 1192) and his mother was a sister of Ban Kulin of Bosnia. Miroslav had ruled Hum under nominal rule of his brother, Stefan Nemanja.

In order to secure Serbian-German relations, during the talks between Stefan Nemanja and Frederic Barbarossa during his passing through Serbia during the Third Crusade, it was arranged that Toljen was betrothed (between 27 Jul 1189 and 24 Apr 1190) to the daughter of Berthold IV, "Duke of Merano Marchese di Istria" and his wife Agnes von Wettin. Berthold IV, who was in Barbarossa's entourage at Niš, had an important part in the Serbian-German talks. It was also decided that knez Toljen would succeed his father before any of his brothers. Toljen was to await his spouse at Istria on the feast day of St. George the following year. In ca. 1190, Stefan Nemanja briefly assigned the rule of Hum to his son Rastko Nemanjić, meanwhile Miroslav held the Lim region with Bijelo Polje. Rastko however took monastic vows and Miroslav continued ruling Hum or parts of it after 1192. Miroslav died of old age in 1198.

== Family ==
Together they had one son, Toljen II, who succeeded as Prince later in 1227-1239.

Ancestors of Toljen of Hum

Vukan; Grand Prince of Serbia (1091–1112)
Uroš I Grand Prince of Serbia (ca. 1112–1145)
Zavida; Prince of Hum (fl. 1112)
Constantine Diogenes; Byzantine prince
Anna Diogenissa; Byzantine princess
Theodora Komnene; Byzantine princess
Miroslav; Prince of Hum (1166-1190; 1192)
Toljen
A sister of Ban Kulin of Bosnia (1180–1204)

== Annotations ==
1. According to naming culture, he had the patronymic Mirosavljević. He was also known as Toljen of Hum (Latin: Tolen de Chulmia).

Regnal titles
Political offices
| Preceded by Rastko | Knez of Hum; 1190s | Succeeded by Petar |
