= Gradnulica =

Former Medieval village now part of Zrenjanin, Serbia

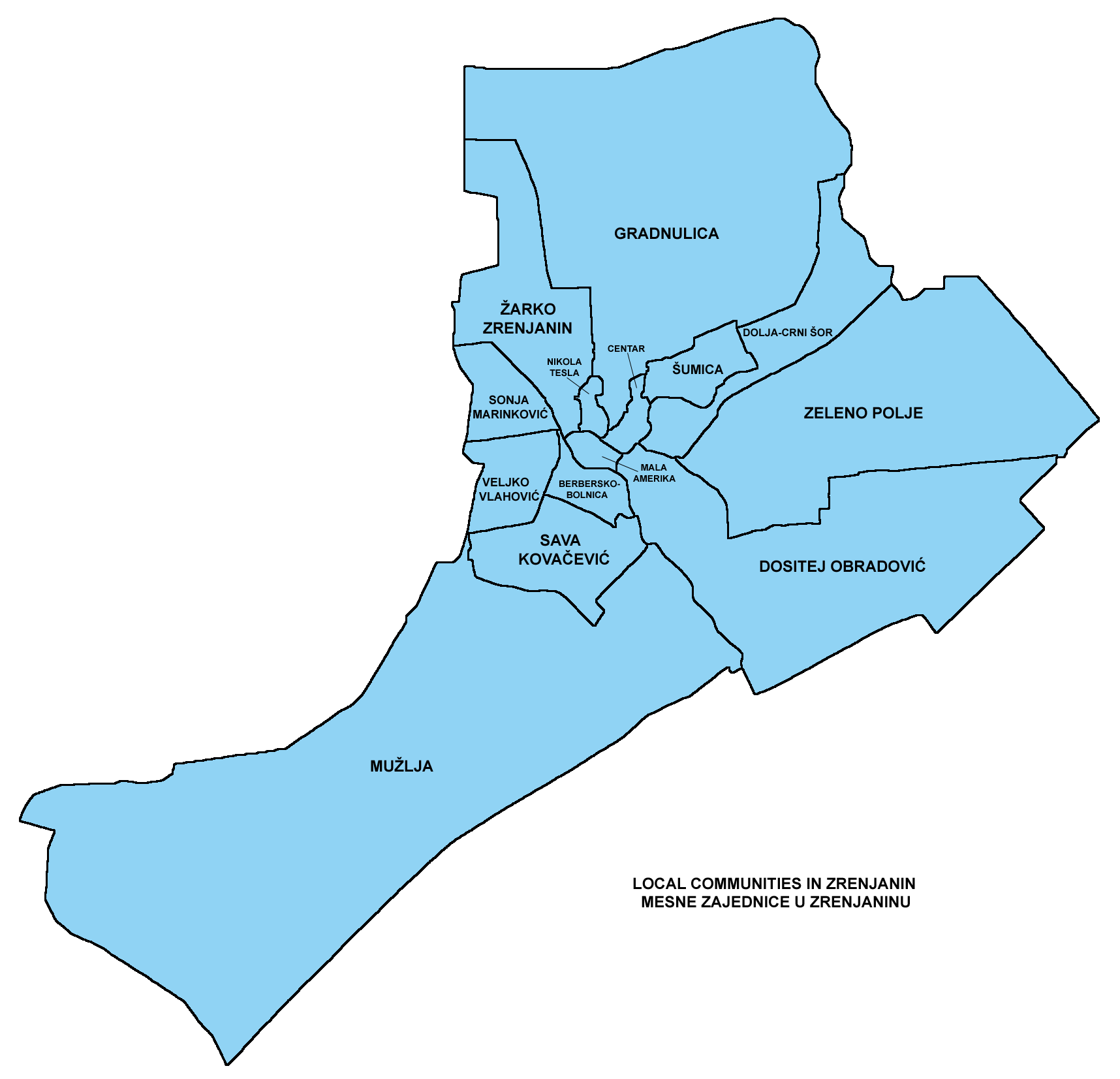
Map of urban local communities of Zrenjanin

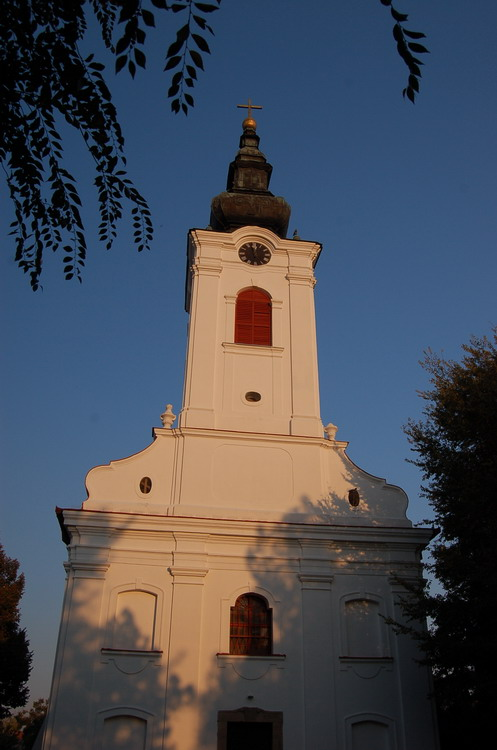
Vavedenska Orthodox church

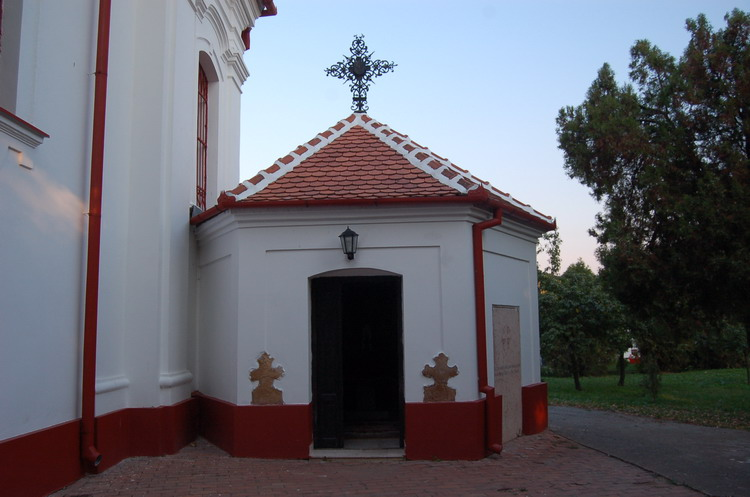
Chapel of Rafailo of Banat

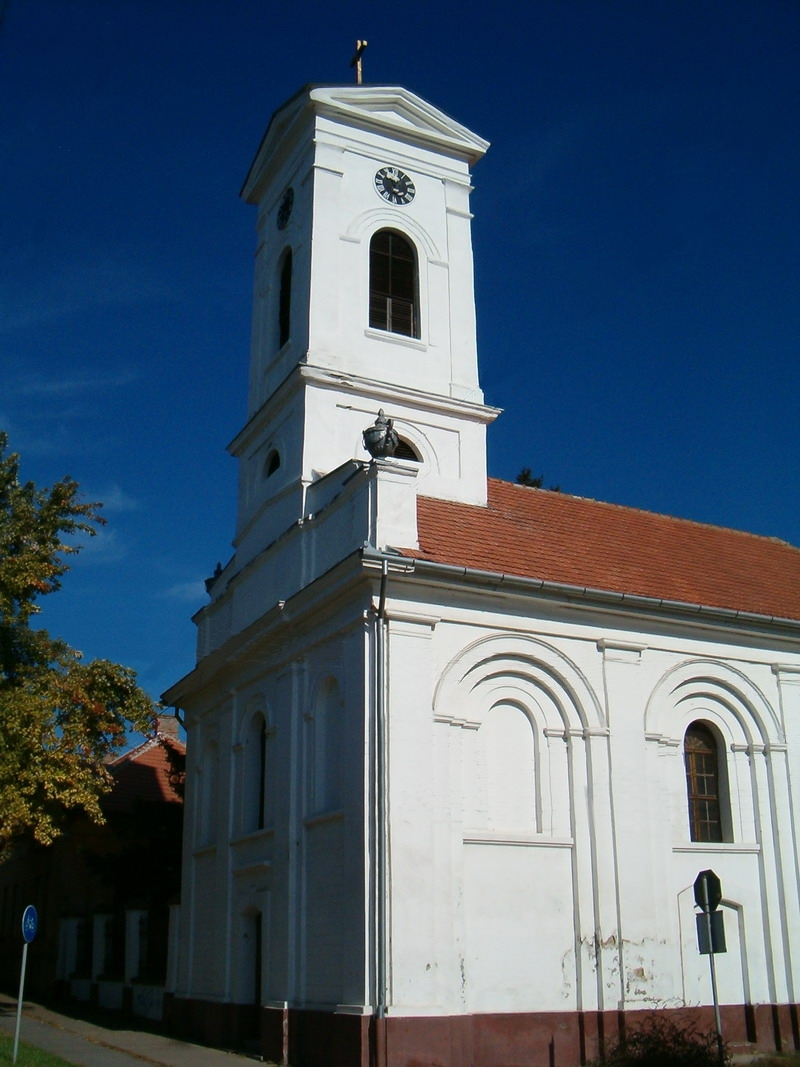
Slovak church

Gradnulica (Serbian Cyrillic: Граднулица) was a former village near Veliki Bečkerek (Zrenjanin) until the 18th century. Today, it is one of the biggest city quarters of Zrenjanin, Serbia.

== History ==
Gradnulica was formed in Medieval period on the banks of the Begej river. Most of the population was Serbian. There is a story about monastery which was on the spot of today's Vavedenska Orthodox church. Name of the monastery was Drenovac (Serbian Cyrillic: Дреновац) and it was surrounded by a deep forest. One of the most famous monks was Rafailo of Banat (Рафаило Банатски or Rafailo Banatski), a missionary from Chilandar monastery, in Holy Mountain. His grave is in the chapel nearby Orthodox church, and it is a place of pilgrimage for many Orthodox believers. This place, where is Vavedenska church, was and still is a historical center of Gradnulica.

== Name ==
There are many theories about the name. Historians believe that a word Gradnulica comes from two words; first is gradna from gradina which means "cliff" and second word is ulica which is Serbian word for "street". That implicates that Gradnulica could mean street on the cliff because Gradnulica used to be on peninsula, surrounded by the Begej river, until the beginning of the 18th century. Also, today's main street of Gradnulica, Cara Dušana or Цара Душана (Tsar Dušan street) is located at the highest point of Gradnulica, in the middle of the former peninsula.

== Churches ==
There are two churches in Gradnulica:

- Vavedenska church or Hram vavedenja Presvete Bogorodice (Church of the Virgin Entrance to the Temple), Orthodox church, built in 1777.
- Slovak evangelic church, Protestant church, built in 1837.

Both churches are located in Cara Dušana street.

== See also ==
- Zrenjanin
