= Sima Lukin Lazić =

Austro-Hungarian Serb publisher, journalist, historian and writer

- Born: August 15, 1863; Bosanski Brod, Bosnia Vilayet
- Died: July 19, 1904 (aged 40)
- Occupations: Publisher, Journalist, Writer

Sima Lukin Lazić (Serbian Cyrillic: Сима Лукин Лазић; 15 August 1863 – 19 July 1904) was a Serbian publisher, journalist, historian and writer. Born in Bosanski Brod, Bosnia Vilayet, into a merchant family, his father was involved in anti-Ottoman affairs forcing him to flee to the Principality of Serbia. Lazić was brought up in Šabac, where he finished primary school, then finished three years of gymnasium in Belgrade in 1876. He signed up as a volunteer in the Serbian–Ottoman War (1876–78) but was rejected due to illness. Not finishing gymnasium, he worked as an actor in circuses. From 1886 to 1889 he acted at the Serbian National Theatre in Novi Sad (Kingdom of Hungary). He lived in Belgrade (Kingdom of Serbia) and Zagreb (Kingdom of Croatia-Slavonia), where he published texts of all kinds. He was the editor of Srbobran and Vrač pogađač. He was a supporter of the People's Radical Party. He was married to Zorka Miletić, the paternal niece of Svetozar Miletić.

== Work ==
- Srbi u davnini, Zagreb 1894.
- Kratka povjesnica Srba od postanja Srpstva do danas, published 1894 in Srbobran, 1895 as book in Zagreb
- Dvije oskoruše, jedna meni, druga njemu, Zagreb 1895.
- Srbin od Srbina, Zagreb 1895.
- Divlji čovjek, Zagreb 1901.

== Sources ==
- Lazić, Sima Lukin (1894). Kratka povjesnica Srba: od postanja Srpstva do danas. Štamparija Karla Albrehta.
