= 9th century in Serbia =

Events from the 9th century in, or regarding, Historic Serbia or Serbs.

== Monarchs ==
The following, of the Vlastimirović dynasty, ruled Serbia:

- Prince Višeslav (fl. 768–814)
- Prince Radoslav (ca. 814–822)
- Prince Prosigoj (ca. 822–836)
- Prince Vlastimir (ca. 836–850)
- Prince Mutimir (ca. 850–891)
  - Prince Strojimir (co-ruler ca. 850–?)
  - Prince Gojnik (co-ruler ca. 850–?)
- Prince Pribislav (891–892)
- Prince Petar (892–917)

== Events ==
- 805
  - Bulgar Khan Krum conquers Braničevo (Braničevci), the Timok Valley (Timočani) and the Obotrites, banishing the tribal chiefs and replacing them with administrators appointed by the central government.
- around 814
  - Višeslav is succeeded by his son Radoslav.
- 818
  - Braničevci and Timočani, together with other tribes of the frontier, revolted and seceded from Omurtag's Bulgaria because of an administrative reform that deprived them of much of their local authority. They left the association (societas) of the Bulgarian Empire and sought, together with many other Slavic tribes, protection from Holy Roman Emperor Louis the Pious, meeting him at his court at Herstal.
- 819–822
  - Ljudevit Posavski leads an uprising against the Franks (819). According to the Royal Frankish Annals, (written 822), Ljudevit went from his seat in Sisak to the Serbs somewhere in western Balkans – the Serbs are mentioned as reportedly holding the great/large part of Dalmatia ("Sorabos, quae natio magnam Dalmatiae partem obtinere dicitur").
- around 822
  - Radoslav is succeeded by his son Prosigoj.
- 822
  - Braničevci and Timočani and other frontier tribes come under Frankish rule.
- In 823
  - The Narentines were at the time (823) subordinate to the Serbian Principality.
- 824–827
  - Timok and Branicevo would be of dispute between the Franks and Bulgars, the Khan sent embassies in 824 and 826 seeking to settle the border dispute, but was neglected. The Bulgarian Empire subsequently annexed the region again.
- 827
  - Omurtag invades Frankish Croatia using boats sailing from the Danube up the Drave, spreading destruction. The Slavs and other tribes on its banks were cowed into submission, and agreed to accept Bulgar governors.
- by 836
  - It is thought that the rapid extension of Bulgars over Slavs to the south prompted the Serbs to unite into a state under Vlastimir.
  - Vlastimir united several Serbian tribes, and Emperor Theophilos (r. 829–842) probably granted the Serbs independence, thus the Serbs acknowledged nominal overlordship of the Emperor.
- ca 839
  - In c. 839 Doge of Venice Pietro Tradonico headed with a large fleet towards the Narentines. They subsequently made peace and renewed a treaty, that would stop the piracy against the Republic of Venice. They however, shortly thereafter, plundered the Venetian borders under the leadership of Uneslav and Diodor. Ljudislav, the Narentine ruler that defeated Doge Pietro in 840, was possibly a co-ruler or successor of Drosaico.
- 839–842
  - Kanasubigi Presian I of Bulgaria (r. 836–852) invades Serbian territory between 839–842 (see Bulgarian–Serbian Wars). The invasion led to a 3-year war, Vlastimir was victorious; Khan Presian made no territorial gain, was heavily defeated and lost many of his men as the Serbs had a tactical advantage in the hills; Presian was driven out by the army of Vlastimir. The war ended with the death of Theophilos in 842, which released Vlastimir from his obligations to the Byzantine Empire.
- after 842, before 846
  - Vlastimir went on to expand to the west, taking southeast Bosnia and northeast Herzegovina (Hum). In the meantime; Braničevo, Morava, the Timok Valley, Vardar and Podrimlje were occupied by the Bulgars.
- after 847
  - Soon after 846, with the end of the Thirty Years’ truce, Presian invaded the regions of the Struma and the Nestos, Empress-Regent Theodora answered by attacking Thracian Bulgaria. A brief peace was concluded, then Presian proceeded to invade Macedonia. The Bulgarians soon annexed Ohrid, Bitola and Devol.
- 847/848
  - Vlastimir marries his daughter to Krajina Belojević (son of Beloje, a lord in Trebinje), in 847/848. Krajina was given the title of Župan, to rule the province of Travunia with Konavle (centered on modern Trebinje), in the name of his father-in-law Vlastimir. The Belojević noble family was entitled the rule of Travunia.
- ca 850
  - Vlastimir dies. He is succeeded by his sons: Mutimir, Strojimir and Gojnik. Mutimir holds the supreme power.
- 853/854
  - The Bulgar Army led by Prince Vladimir, the son of Boris I of Bulgaria, invaded Serbia in an attempt for vengeance for the previous defeat of Presian 839–842 against Vlastimir. The Serbian Army was led by Mutimir and his brothers, which defeated the Bulgars, capturing Vladimir and 12 boyars. Boris I and Mutimir agreed on peace (and perhaps an alliance), and Mutimir sent his sons Pribislav and Stefan to the border to escort the prisoners, where they exchanged items as a sign of peace, Boris himself gave them "rich gifts", while he was given "two slaves, two falcons, two dogs, and 80 furs".
- before 869
  - Mutimir sent envoys to Byzantine Emperor Basil I, asking him to baptize the lands. He put Serbia under the suzerainty of the Byzantine Empire.
- 869
  - The Saracens attacked Ragusa in 869. The Ragusians asked Basil I for help, which he answered, sending a large flotilla with his admiral Niketas Ooryphas. Ooryphas manages to add the neighbouring tribes of Zahumlje, Travunia and Konavli (Serbian Pomorje) in the operation. The tribes were to aid with both fleets and land forces.
  - At the same time, the Croats join Louis II of Italy.
  - The pagan Narentines sacked a ship with emissaries returning from Constantinople, which enraged Basil I, resulting in him sending a fleet, subsequently subduing them.
- By 871
  - Serbia is accounted Christian as of about 870.
- after 871, before 878
  - The first Serbian bishopric was founded at the political center at Ras, near modern Novi Pazar on the Ibar river. The initial affiliation is uncertain, it may have been under the subordination of either Split or Durazzo, both then Byzantine. The early church of Saint Apostles Peter and Paul at Ras, can be dated to the 9th–10th century, with the rotunda plan characteristic of first court chapels. The bishopric was established shortly after 871, during the rule of Mutimir, and was part of the general plan of establishing bishoprics in the Slav lands of the Empire, confirmed by the Council of Constantinople in 879–880.
- between 870–874
  - Petar, the son of Gojnik, is born.
- after 870, before 891
  - An internal conflict among the dynastic brothers resulted in Mutimir banishing the two younger brothers to the Bulgarian court. He kept Petar in his court, for political reasons. Petar soon fled to Croatia. The reason of the feud is not known, however, it is postulated that it was a result of treachery.
- By 878
  - By 878, all of Dalmatia were under the Byzantine overlordship (Theme of Dalmatia), also most of the lands were under the religious jurisdiction of the Ecumenical Patriarchate of Constantinople.
- 878
  - The Eparchy of Braničevo was founded in 878 (as continuation of Viminacium and Horreum Margi).
- 891
  - Mutimir died in 891, and was succeeded by his eldest son, Pribislav. He was most likely buried in the Church of Peter and Paul at Ras, as did Petar (r. 892–917).
- 892
  - Pribislav only ruled for a year when Petar returned in 892, defeating him in battle and seizing the throne, Pribislav fled to Croatia with his brothers Bran and Stefan.
- 894
  - Bran later returned and led an unsuccessful rebellion against Petar in 894. Bran was defeated, captured and blinded (blinding was a Byzantine tradition that meant to disqualify a person to take the throne)
- 896
  - In 896, Klonimir returns from Bulgaria, backed by Tsar Boris, and invades Serbia, taking the important stronghold Dostinika (Drsnik, in Klina). Klonimir was defeated and killed.
- ca 896
  - Duke Glad, according to the 13th-century chronicle Gesta Ungarorum, ruled in the territory of modern Banat at the time of the Hungarian conquest of the Carpathian Basin around 896.
  - Principality of Lower Pannonia's temporary holdings included territory in the east of the Danube and in the south of the Drava, i.e. parts of present-day central Hungary (between Danube and Tisa), northern Serbia (Bačka, west Syrmia) and eastern Croatia (west Syrmia, east Slavonia).
- Second half of the 9th century
  - The seal of Strojimir (died between 880–896), the brother of Mutimir, was bought by the Serbian state in an auction in Germany. The seal has a Patriarchal cross in the center and Greek inscriptions that say: "God, help Strojimir (CTPOHMIP)".
  - Hvalimir Belojević holds Travunia.

== Bibliography ==
- Bury, J. B. (2008). History of the Eastern Empire from the Fall of Irene to the Accession of Basil: A.D. 802-867. Cosimo. ISBN 978-1-60520-421-5.
- Fine, John Van Antwerp (1991). The Early Medieval Balkans: A Critical Survey from the Sixth to the Late Twelfth Century. Michigan: The University of Michigan Press. ISBN 0-472-08149-7.
- Houtsma, M. Th. (1993). E.J. Brill's first encyclopaedia of Islam 1913–1936. BRILL. ISBN 90-04-08265-4.
- Runciman, Steven (1930). A history of the First Bulgarian Empire. London: G. Bell & Sons. Archived from the original on 2013-07-09.
