= Zaharija of Serbia =

Serbian ruler in the 10th century

Zaharija
- archon (ἄρχων)
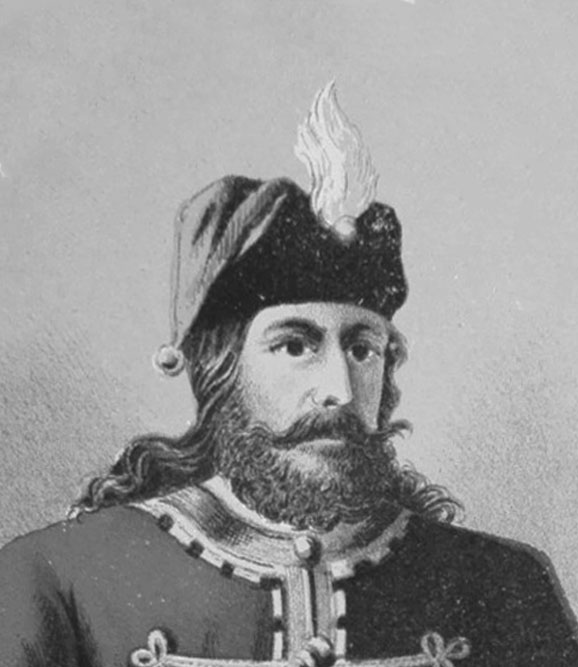
- 1902 artistic illustration of Zaharija

Prince of Serbia
- Reign: 921–925/926
- Predecessor: Pavle
- Successor: Časlav
- Born: 870s Serbia or Constantinople
- Died: after 926; Byzantine Empire
- Dynasty: Vlastimirović
- Father: Prvoslav
- Religion: Christian

Zaharija (Serbian: Захарија; c. 870s – fl. 926) was the ruler of Serbia from 921 to 925/926. Zaharija belonged to the exiled main branch of the Serbian dynasty, as the son of Prvoslav (r. 891–892). He was sent by Byzantine emperor Romanos Lekapenos (r. 920–944) to take the Serbian throne from Pavle in 921, but he failed, and was sent as a political hostage to Bulgaria. After Pavle switched sides to Byzantium, the Bulgarian emperor Simeon I now sent Zaharija, who managed to take the Serbian throne and immediately became a subject of Byzantium. He successfully fought off a Bulgar campaign, sending war trophies to emperor Romanos. Simeon sent a larger army, before which Zaharija fled to Croatia. Serbia was devastated and Zaharija likely retired in Byzantium.

== History ==
The history of the Serbian principalities and the Vlastimirović dynasty is known from the De Administrando Imperio (DAI) compiled by Byzantine emperor Constantine VII Porphyrogenitus (r. 913–959) between 948 and 952. Serbia and Bulgaria came into contact in the mid-9th century, and Bulgaria had up until then expanded their territory in the Balkan interior by taking Byzantine territory. Byzantium and Bulgaria also had a rivalry regarding influence on the peoples in the central Balkans. The DAI speaks of changing outcomes in 9th-century Bulgar–Serb conflicts, which themselves were a consequence and reflection of the Byzantine–Bulgarian wars. When Serbian ruler Vlastimir died, the rule of Serbia was divided among his sons Mutimir, Strojimir and Gojnik. The division of land shows patrimonialism in the ruling family, also found among some other early medieval peoples; while the territory of each brother is unknown, Mutimir, as the oldest, would have primacy among the three.

Some time after the Bulgar–Serb war, the three sons of Vlastimir came into conflict and Mutimir captured his two brothers and expelled them to Bulgaria. Strojimir and Gojnik were thus stripped of their rule and sent as political hostages, and this is dated to 855/856 or the 860s. Mutimir's oldest son Prvoslav ruled in 891–892, until Petar Gojniković (Gojnik's son) arrived with an army and took the throne in 892, forcing Prvoslav and his brothers Bran and Stefan to flee to Croatia. Prvoslav had either died in Croatia by the time Bran tried to take the throne from Petar in 895, or moved to Byzantine capital Constantinople where Zaharija is later mentioned. T. Živković believed Prvoslav moved to the théma (province) of Dalmatia and then to Constantinople at some point. It is unknown whether Zaharija was born in Constantinople, but he surely was brought up in a Christian and Byzantine environment.

Zaharija's cousin Pavle (b. 870s) succeeded the Serbian throne in late 917 or 917/918 after Bulgarian emperor Simeon I sent an army led by Theodore Sigritsa and Marmais that had Petar ousted and imprisoned in Bulgaria, where Petar died. Pavle began his rule as a loyal subject of Simeon, which meant that the Bulgarian threat to Serbia was gone. Bulgaria was winning in the Byzantine–Bulgarian struggle following their victory at Achelous, and their precedence is also seen in their influence in Serbia and Pavle. At this time, Zahumlje was independently ruled by dux Michael (fl. 912–927), who had allied with Bulgaria against Petar Gojniković. In December 920, the admiral Romanos Lekapenos who had been part of the regency for the minor Constantine VII, rose to become the Byzantine emperor. Romanos understood that Byzantium needed Serbia to open a front in the west of Bulgaria to counter Simeon.

In the beginning of 921, Romanos Lekapenos sent archontopoulos (ἀρχοντόπουλος, "son of the archon", meaning "prince") Zaharija from Constantinople to take the Serbian throne (...πρὸς τὸ γενέσθαι ἄρχοντα ἐν Σερβλίᾳ...). He must have had a considerable army and took the route which avoided Bulgarian territory, that is, via Byzantine-held Dyrrachion and Duklja into what is today northeastern Montenegro. Zaharija's attempt failed, as he was defeated in battle, captured, and handed over to the Bulgars. Pavle however switched sides and became hostile to Bulgaria, and this was a result of Byzantine politics in the wider area of the Serb (Dalmatian) principalities, as well as internal discord and external pressure. For instance, Michael in Zahumlje was a Bulgarian ally and rival to Pavle, and perhaps Pavle could push him aside with Byzantine help. Apart from this, only recognition from Rome and Constantinople, and not Bulgaria, really mattered in the Christian world.

That same year, in 921, the Bulgars now decided to send Zaharija to take the Serbian throne from Pavle, and he succeeded. Simeon thus secured his western frontier and could continue the offensive against Thrace and Constantinople. Zaharija however immediately (πάραυτα) returned as a subject of Byzantium, as he did not wish to subordinate himself to the Bulgars, and it would also lend him the legitimacy and primacy among the Serb principalities. Zaharija sided with Byzantium despite its defeats at the hands of the Bulgars. The legitimacy of Zaharija, as Pavle before him, was not challenged among the župani, which shows that primogeniture or secundogeniture was less important in the 10th century and that belonging to the Serbian dynasty sufficed.

Bulgarian emperor Simeon reacted by sending the commanders Theodore Sigritsa and Marmais, as he had done in 917/918 against Petar, to now eliminate Zaharija, some time between 921 and 923. The Bulgar army was dispatched "still during struggle between Rhomaioi [Byzantium] and the Bulgars", and thus undoubtedly is dated prior to the signing of Byzantine–Bulgarian truce of November 923. The Bulgar army was decisively defeated, and the two commanders fell, with Zaharija sending their decapitated heads and war trophies (weapons and equipment) to emperor Romanos in Constantinople as a sign of triumph. Zaharija and Romanos exchanged diplomatic envoys, and Zaharija likely received monetary donations.

In 925/926 Simeon sent a large army against Serbia under the command of Bulgar boyars with the ranks of kavkhan, minik and ichirgu-boila (as he had done against Constantinople in 923), which would have a decisive outcome for Serbia and its role in the Byzantine–Bulgarian war. Accompanying the Bulgar army was Časlav, who was born in Bulgaria and was the son of the earlier Serbian pretender Klonimir. Fearing the larger Bulgarian army, considerably larger than the previous one, Zaharija fled to Croatia. Zaharija likely ended up with Byzantine property in Dalmatia, in safety, and perhaps returned to Constantinople.

== Aftermath ==
It was a punitive expedition meant to destroy the Serbian state administration. After Zaharija's flight, the Bulgars called on the Serbian župani to accept Časlav as the archon. This shows the political organization as the archon (or in Serbian, knez) had župani under him that needed to accept and recognize him, and perhaps took an oath of allegiance. The Bulgars however had no intention to appoint a new Serbian ruler, and used Časlav as a lure to capture the župani and Časlav, and sent them to captivity in Bulgaria. Serbia was devastated and part of the people were enslaved and sent to Bulgaria, and some found refuge in Croatia. Serbia came under nominal Bulgarian rule, and was not integrated into the territorial system nor militarily or administratively occupied. As Simeon's policy in supporting candidates in Serbia had failed previously, he simply subjected Serbia without appointing Časlav, perhaps partially motivated by the strained relations with Croatia. The Bulgar cause of next attacking Croatia was possibly due to it being the safe haven of the exiled Serbian ruler and part of the population, and also as a counter-measure to a potential Byzantine–Croatian alliance. It perhaps simply was meant to pursue Zaharija and the remnant of his army. In 926 or 927, the Bulgarian army invaded and was completely destroyed in Croatia. Following the death of Simeon (27 May 927), Časlav escaped captivity and took the Serbian throne, and consolidated power with the help of Romanos.

== Legacy ==
In late May 1896 the Zagreb national theatre hosted the drama tragedy Simeun Veliki ("Simeon the Great") of A. Tresić surrounding events of Simeon I and Serbia and Croatia; Pavle Branović and Zaharija were among the characters. Stevan Sremac (1855–1906) authored the historic novel series Iz knjiga starostavnih, which includes the Vlastimirović dynasty (and Zaharija) as characters.

There is a street named after him in Mramorski Potok.

== See also ==
- List of Serbian monarchs

== Annotations ==
1. The name Zaharija (Захарија) is biblical. It is rendered Ζαχαρίας (transliterated as Zacharias) in DAI.
2. In historiography, the account on them finding refuge in Croatia is deemed illogical as it was the location of departure of the usurper Petar Gojniković. P. Komatina deemed it unlikely that it was a transcription error and does not support T. Živković's suggestion that it should say Bulgaria instead of Croatia.
3. T. Živković (2006) dated Pavle's reign from 917 to 923, for six years; Simeon's dispatch of Zaharija to 923; and Sigritsa and Marmais' campaign to before September/October 924 when a Byzantine–Bulgarian truce came into effect. T. Leszka dated the Bulgarian invasion which Časlav accompanied to 924. P. Komatina refuted the previous views and dated Pavle's reign from 917/918 to 921, for three years, as DAI says (Еἶτα μετὰ χρόνους τρεῖς), and that Zaharija was sent the first time by Romanos in the beginning of 921, and the second time by Simeon that same year; Sigritsa and Marmais' campaign came before November 923 when the Byzantine–Bulgarian truce was signed. The second Bulgarian campaign against Zaharija came after the Byzantine–Bulgarian truce of 923, and some date it to 924, however, the DAI's statement that Zaharija defeated the first campaign, which was between 921 and 923, and sent the war trophies, then exchanged envoys shows a longer time frame than that, likely 925 or 926.

== Sources ==
- Komatina, Predrag (2021). Константин Порфирогенит и рана историја Јужних Словена [Constantine Porphyrogenitus and the Early History of South Slavs]. Византолошки институт, Београд. ISBN 978-86-83883-28-8.
- Komatina, Predrag (2015). "О српско-бугарској граници у IX и X веку". Зборник радова Византолошког института. 52: 31–42. ISSN 2406-0917.
- Leszka, Mirosław J.; Marinow, Kirił (2018). "Foreign Policy". The Bulgarian State in 927–969: The Epoch of Tsar Peter I. Byzantina Lodziensia XXXIV. Jagiellonian University Press. doi:10.18778/8142-115-7.
- Pavlović, Bojana (2025). "The Balkans between Byzantium and Bulgaria". In Krsmanović, Bojana (ed.). Barbarians, Rhomaioi and those in between: integrating the Christians of the Central Balkans into the Byzantine Empire (late 10th–mid-13th Century). Vol. 1. Institute for Byzantine Studies. doi:10.46793/barb.rhom.i.007p. ISBN 978-86-83883-29-5.
- Uzelac, Aleksandar (2018). "Prince Michael of Zahumlje – a Serbian ally of tsar Symeon". In Nikolov, Angel; Kanev, Nikolay (eds.). Emperor Symeon's Bulgaria in the History of Europe's South-East: 1100 years from the Battle of Achelous. St Kliment Ohridski University Press, Sofia. pp. 236–245 – via Academia.edu.
- Živković, Tibor (2006). Портрети српских владара: IX-XII век [Portraits of Serbian Rulers: IX-XII century]. Завод за уџбенике и наставна средства, Београд. ISBN 9788617137548.
- Živković, Tibor (2008). Forging unity: The South Slavs between East and West 550-1150. Belgrade: The Institute of History, Čigoja štampa. ISBN 978-86-7558-573-2.

Zaharija of Serbia Vlastimirović dynasty Born: 870s Died: after 926
Regnal titles
Preceded by Pavle	Prince of Serbia; 921–925/926	Succeeded by Časlav
Titles in pretence
Preceded by Petar, Pavle as Prince of Serbia	— TITULAR — Prince of Serbia; 892–921; Reason for succession failure: Exile	Succession
