= Bulgarian–Serbian wars (medieval) =

Conflicts during the Middle Ages

Bulgarian–Serbian Wars
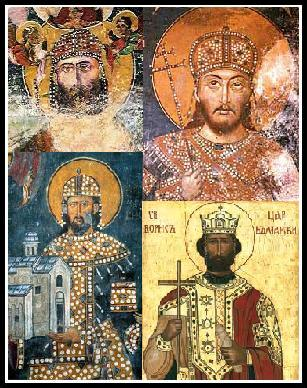
- Clockwise from top left: Ivan Alexander of Bulgaria; Stefan Dušan of Serbia; Boris I of Bulgaria; Stefan Dragutin of Serbia.
Date	818–1330 AD (512 Years)
Location	Western Balkans
Territorial changes	Both states had numerous territorial changes.

Belligerents
Bulgaria: First Bulgarian Empire; Second Bulgarian Empire	Serbia: Principality of Serbia; Duklja; Kingdom of Serbia

Commanders and leaders
Presian; Boris I; Vladimir-Rasate (POW); Simeon I; Alogobotur; Marmais †; Theodore Sigritsa †; Samuel; Ivan Vladislav; Kaloyan; Darman and Kudelin; Shishman; Michael Shishman †	Vlastimir; Mutimir; Petar (POW); Pavle; Zaharija; Jovan Vladimir †; Vukan Nemanjić; Stefan Dragutin; Stefan Milutin; Stefan Dečanski

The Bulgarian–Serbian wars were a series of conflicts between the Bulgarian Empire and medieval Serbian states between the 9th and 14th centuries in the central Balkans.

Before the 12th century, the Serbian states were dependent upon and strongly influenced by the dominant Balkan powers, the Bulgarian and Byzantine Empires. The rulers of both those countries sought to control Serb princes to use them as allies in the Byzantine-Bulgarian Wars. The first war between Bulgarians and Serbs occurred during the reign of Presian between 839 and 842, precipitated by Byzantine diplomacy. Later after series of campaigns the Bulgarian Emperor Simeon I conquered and destroyed the Serb state in 924. The Bulgarian Emperor Peter I granted formal independence to Serbia in 931 and appointed his protégé Časlav Klonimirović as its ruler. The most powerful Serbian state of the time, that of Duklja, was again subjugated by Emperor Samuil in 998.

In the 13th century Stefan Dragutin and his brother Stefan Milutin fought against the Bulgarian governors of Belgrade and Braničevo, Darman and Kudelin and managed to defeat them. In 1327 the Emperors of Bulgaria and Byzantium signed an anti-Serbian alliance to stop Serbia's growing power but in 1330 Bulgarian Emperor Michael III Shishman was defeated by Stefan Dečanski in the battle of Velbazhd.

== Wars of the 9th century ==
According to Byzantine sources, Bulgaria and the Serbs co-existed peacefully prior to the 9th century. In 818 Slavic tribes along the Timok River rebelled against the increasingly centralized Bulgarian suzerainty along its western frontier. Omurtag launched an attack into in 827, secured control over territory as far as Pannonia, expelled the local Slavic chiefs, and installed Bulgarian governors. Serbian tribes began to unify under a prince named Vlastimir in resistance to Bulgarian expansion, and the Byzantine emperor Theophilos, who was officially overlord of the Serbian tribes, supported this unity and probably granted the Serbs independence as a counterweight to the Bulgarians.

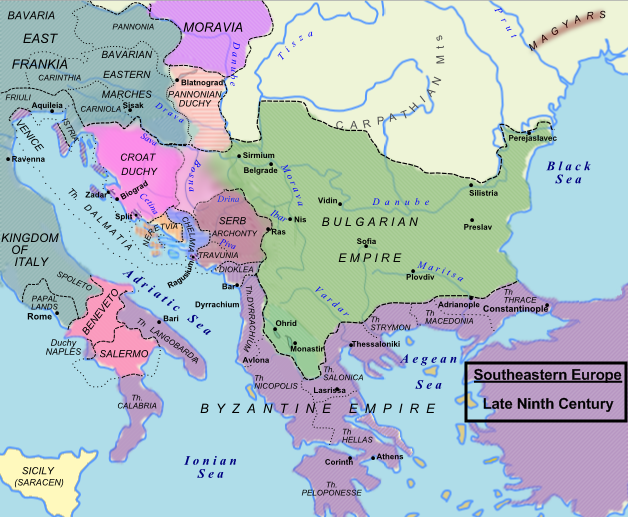
The Balkans, 9th century

According to Porphyrogenitus, Bulgaria sought to continue the conquest of lands to the west and to force the Serbs into subjugation. Bulgarian ruler Presian I (r. 836–852) launched an invasion into Serbian territory in 839, leading to three years of war. Presian was heavily defeated, lost a large part of his army, and made no territorial gains. The Byzantines achieved their objective, however, as Bulgarian attentions were diverted, and the Byzantines managed to cope with Slavic rebellions in Peloponnese. Fine notes another instance when a Bulgarian invasion may have been chosen to coincide with Byzantine preoccupation with Slavic uprisings. "The best-known one broke out among the Slavs of the Peloponnesus during the reign of Theophilus (829–42). They liberated themselves and ravaged the area before they were subdued by a Byzantine commander". The war ended with the death of Theophilos in 842, releasing Vlastimir from his obligations to the emperor and giving Bulgaria the opportunity to attack the Byzantine Empire and annex the area of Ohrid, Bitola, and Devol in 842–843.

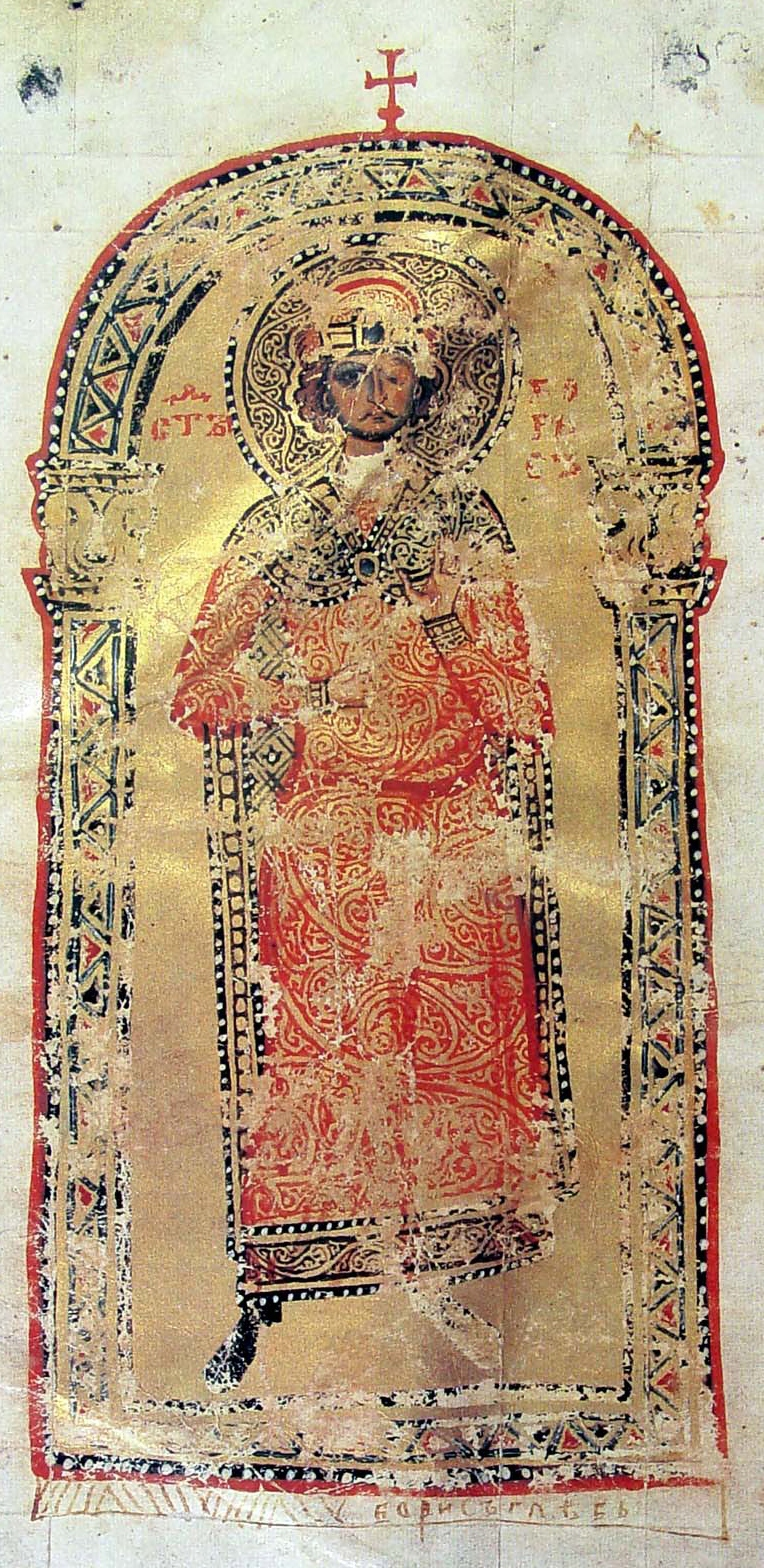
Boris I of Bulgaria

Vlastimir died in about 850, and his state was divided between his sons Mutimir, Strojimir, and Gojnik. In 853 or 854, the new Bulgarian ruler Boris I sent an army, led by his son Vladimir, to attack the Serbs, aiming to replace Byzantine influence over them. The Serbian army led by Mutimir and his brothers defeated the Bulgarians, capturing Vladimir and twelve leading boyars, who had to be ransomed. Boris I and Mutimir agreed on peace (and perhaps an alliance). Mutimir sent his sons Pribislav and Stefan to escort the prisoners to the border, where they exchanged items as a sign of peace. Boris himself gave them "rich gifts", receiving in return "two slaves, two falcons, two dogs, and 80 furs".

Mutimir soon seized the Serbian throne, exiling his brothers to the Bulgarian court, and ruled until his death in about 890. A power struggle ensued within the ruling family before Mutimir's nephew Peter emerged to capture the throne in 892, gaining the recognition of the Bulgarian ruler Simeon the Great. This resulted in twenty years of peace within Serbia and a Bulgarian-Serbian alliance from 897–917.

== Campaigns of Simeon the Great ==
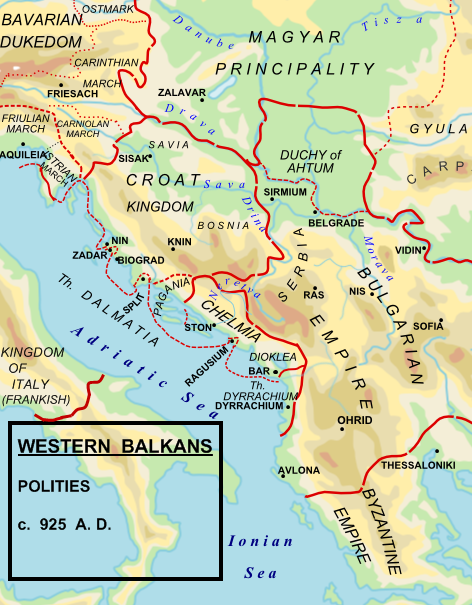
The Balkans, early 10th century.

For the next half century following the campaign of Boris I, both countries were at peace, and the Serbs looked to Bulgaria as a source of their culture. In 917 the Byzantines managed to bribe the Serbian prince Petar Gojniković to turn against his ally, Simeon I. After the Byzantine army was annihilated in the battle of Achelous on 20 August that year, the Bulgarian emperor had to delay his march to Constantinople in order to secure his western borders. In the autumn of 917 Simeon sent an army under the generals Theodore Sigritsa and Marmais to invade Serbia and punish Gojniković for his treason. They convinced Petar Gojniković to meet them, but when the Serbian Prince came he was captured and taken to Preslav where he died in prison. The Bulgarians installed Petar's cousin Pavle Branović, who was under the wing of Simeon, in his place.

In 921, the Bulgarians controlled almost every Byzantine possession on the Balkans, and the latter tried once again to turn the Serbs against Bulgaria. Romanos Lekapenos sent Zaharije Pribisavljević against Pavle, who was loyal to Simeon, but Zaharije was defeated and sent to Bulgaria, to be used against Pavle if the latter was insubordinate. However, the Byzantines managed to bribe Pavle, and while the Bulgarians were besieging Adrianople, the Serbs started hostilities against Bulgaria. This time Simeon easily defeated them – he sent Zaharije with a Bulgarian army into Serbia. Pavle was defeated, and his throne was taken by Zaharije. Zlatarski dates that campaign to 922, while Fine suggests it took place in the period between 921 and 923.

Byzantine historians, however, wrote that after Zaharije "recalled the beneficence of the Byzantine Emperor, [he] immediately rebelled against the Bulgarians because he did not want to submit to them but preferred to be a subject of the Byzantine Emperor." Since Zaharije had long lived in Constantinople, it was not difficult for the Byzantines to win him as an ally. Angered with his betrayal, in 924 Simeon sent an army led by Theodore Sigritsa and Marmais to crush the Serbs, but the Bulgarians were insufficient in number. They were ambushed and defeated, and the heads of their commanders were sent to Constantinople. Enraged, Simeon pretended that he was ready to conclude peace with the Byzantine Empire and in the meantime summoned a large army against the Serbs under the generals Knin, Imnik and Itsvoklius along with the new pretender of the Serbian throne Časlav Klonimirović. When the news of those preparations reached Zaharije, he immediately fled to Croatia. However, this time the Bulgarians decided to fully conquer the Serbian principality. The Serbian nobles were persuaded to meet Časlav and were captured and taken to Preslav. The Bulgarian army devastated Serbia and moved the population to Bulgaria while some escaped to Croatia and Byzantium. Serbia was included in the borders of the Bulgarian Empire for a period of several years until 930-931 when prince Časlav managed to escape from Preslav and organized a successful revolt against the new emperor Peter I. Practically Serbia did not exist at that time. It became independent only to fall ca. 960 under Byzantine and later under Bulgarian rule.

== Campaigns of Samuil ==
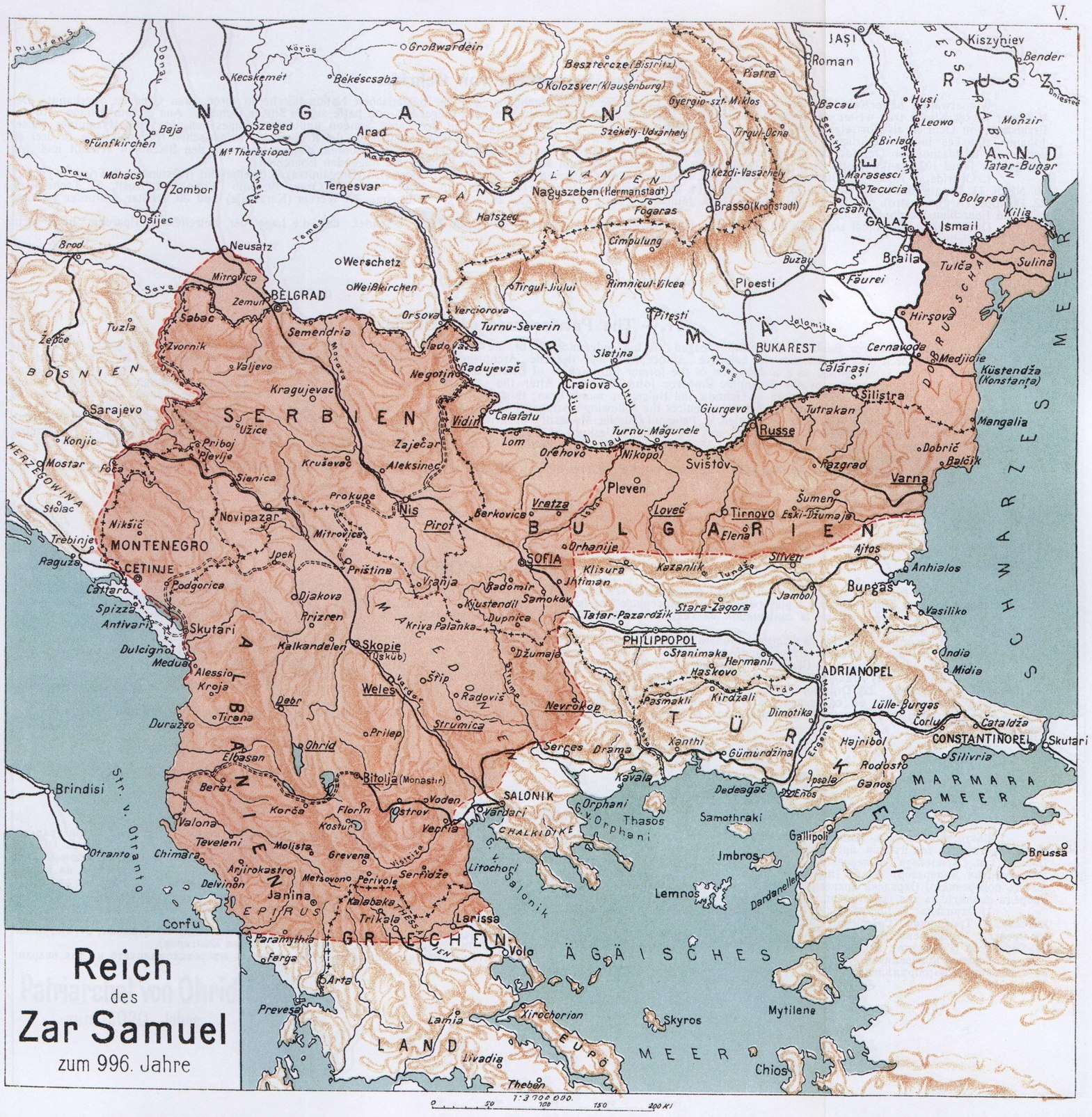
Map of Bulgaria in its largest extension during Samuel's reign circa 1000.

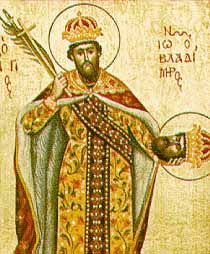
Prince Jovan Vladimir.

After the defeat at Spercheios in 996 against the Byzantines, the Bulgarian Emperor Samuil turned his attention to the Serbian and Croatian principalities to the northwest where the Byzantine influence was very strong. In 998 he invaded the Serbian principality of Duklja, which was ruled by Prince Jovan Vladimir. The Serbs were unable to resist the Bulgarian army, and Jovan Vladimir fled with his people in the Oblica mountain. When Samuil arrived he left part of his army to bar the Serbs, and with the rest of his troops he besieged the coastal fortress of Ulcinj. To avoid further bloodshed the Bulgarians offered to allow Jovan Vladimir to surrender; he initially refused, but after it became clear that his nobles were ready to betray him, he surrendered to Samuil. Jovan Vladimir was exiled to Samuil's palaces in Prespa. Then the Bulgarians seized Kotor and set off for Dubrovnik and Dalmatia.

While Jovan Vladimir was in Bulgarian captivity, one of the daughters of Samuil, Theodora Kosara, fell in love with the young Serbian Prince, and Samuil approved their marriage. Jovan Vladimir was allowed to return to his lands as a Bulgarian official, supervised by a trusted man of the Bulgarian Emperor, Dragomir. However, in 1016 he was killed by the new Bulgarian Emperor Ivan Vladislav who was suspicious that Vladimir could be a potential candidate for the throne.

== Conflicts in the 13th century ==
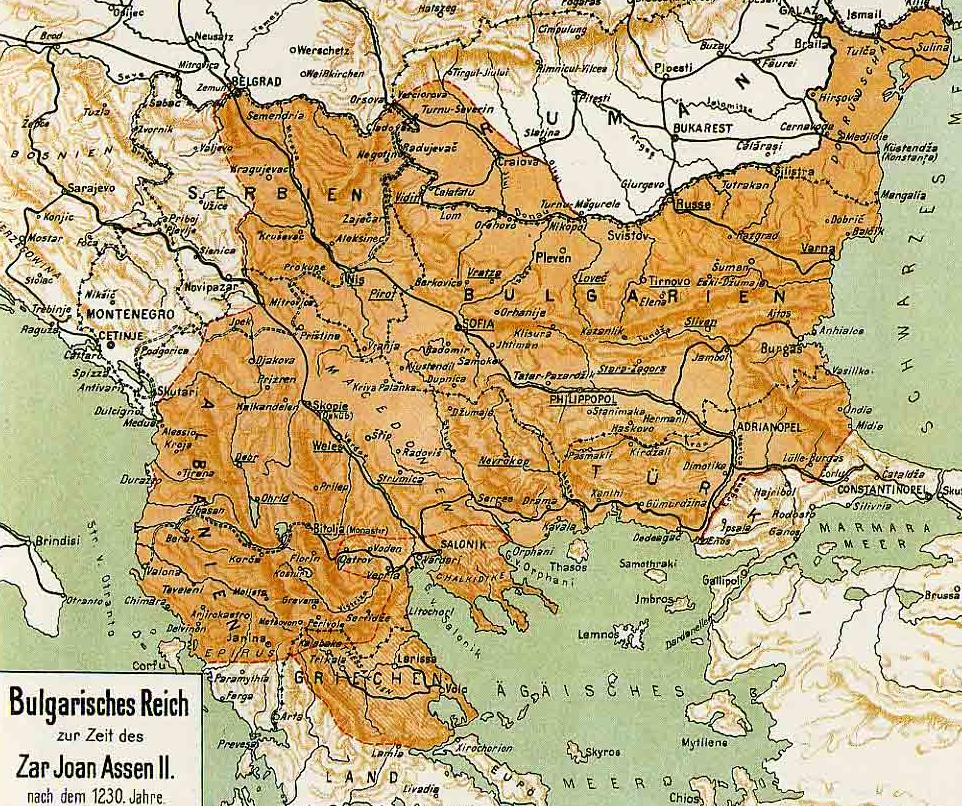
The Bulgarian Empire during the reign of Ivan Asen II (1218 – 1241)

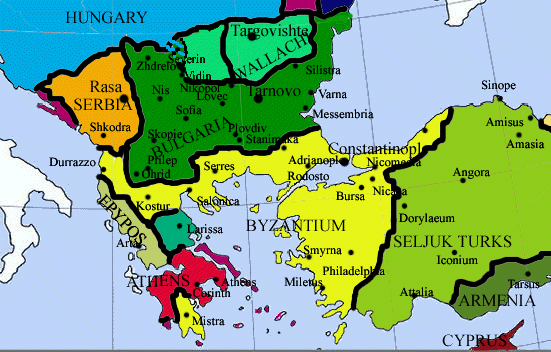
South-eastern Europe, c. 1261 (the Bulgarian Empire in dark green, the Kingdom of Serbia in orange).

The first clashes between the reborn Bulgarian Empire and the Serbs who acted as Hungarian vassals occurred in 1202. Emeric of Hungary took advantage of the campaigns of the Bulgarian Emperor Kaloyan and took the Bulgarian cities Belgrade, Branicevo, and Niš. The latter was given to his vassal, the Serbian zhupan Valkan (Vukan). However, in 1203 the Bulgarian army pushed the Serbs out of Niš (which Fine suggests had been under Serbian rule since the 1190s) and defeated the Hungarians in battles along the Morava river.

In 1289 the Hungarians asked their vassal Stefan Dragutin to attack the Bulgarian nobles Darman and Kudelin, rulers of the Branicevo province, who had previously defeated the Hungarians. In 1290 Dragutin invaded the province but was defeated by Darman and Kudelin, who then attacked his lands. Dragutin had to ask his brother Stefan Milutin, the King of Serbia, to help him. In 1291 they defeated the Bulgarians, who fled to Vidin. The despot of Vidin also fought the Serbs, but the war was unsuccessful and Vidin was sacked. Bulgaria lost the Belgrade and Branicevo provinces forever.

== Conflicts in the 14th century ==
After 1291 Bulgaria and Serbia maintained friendly relations. In 1296 the Bulgarian Emperor Smilets married his daughter Theodora to the future Serbian King Stefan Uroš III Dečanski. The sister of Dečanski Anna Neda was married to the Bulgarian Emperor Michael III Shishman. However, the growth of the Serbian Kingdom in the late 13th and early 14th century raised serious concern in the royal courts in Tarnovo and Constantinople – while both Empires had numerous external and internal problems, the Serbs expanded their state in northern Macedonia.

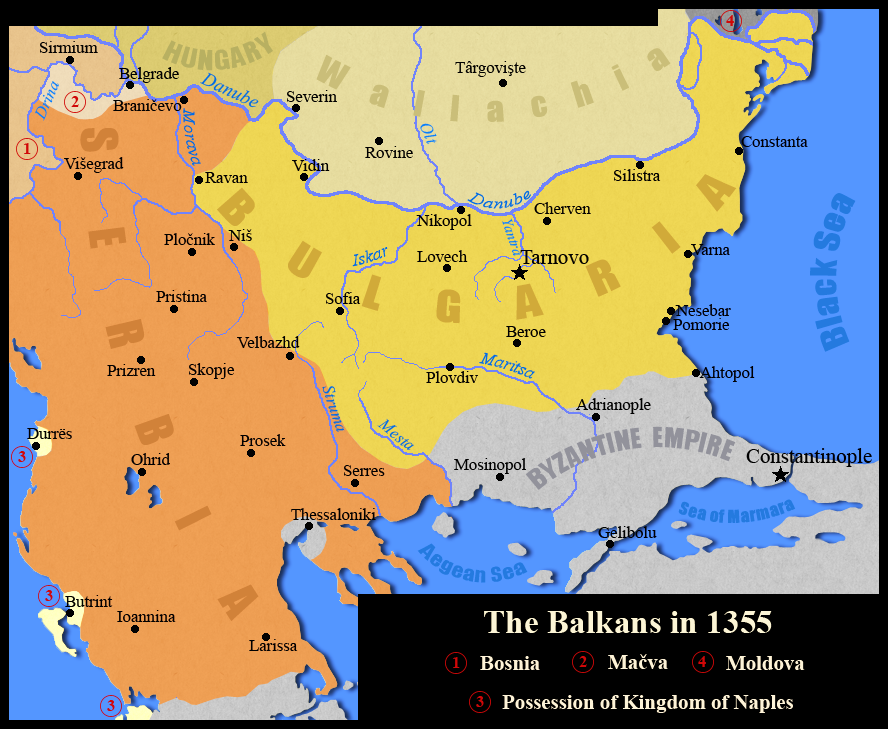
The Balkans in 1355, with Serbia at its greatest extent.

On 13 May 1327 Michael III Shishman and Andronikos III Palaiologos signed a treaty against Serbia and agreed to launch a joint campaign. The two emperors had disputes, but they were cleared by 1328 and the alliance was reaffirmed in October. The campaign began in July 1330 when the Byzantines invaded Serbia from the south; after they seized several fortresses, however, their campaign was halted by orders of Andronikos III. In the meantime the Bulgarian army, which numbered around 15,000 men, attacked from the east. On 24 July the armies of Bulgaria and Serbia (which numbered between 15,000 and 18,000 men) met near the town of Velbazhd (Kyustendil). Despite the one-day truce agreed by the two rulers, the Serbs broke their word and attacked the Bulgarians while the latter were scattered to search for provisions. Caught by surprise and outnumbered, the Bulgarians tried to organize resistance but were defeated. The wounded Emperor Michael III Shishman was captured by the victors and died four days later.

Despite their victory, the Serbs were unable to continue their campaign in Bulgaria – Stefan Dečanski did not risk confronting the Bulgarian reserves led by the Emperor's brother and despot of Vidin, Belaur, and the despot of Lovech, Ivan Alexander. Furthermore, he was under pressure from the south where there were Byzantine forces. After short negotiations near the castle of Izvor, Belaur and Dečanski concluded a peace treaty according to which the Bulgarian throne was inherited by the son of Michael III Shishman and Anna Neda, Ivan Stefan. Bulgaria did not lose territory but was unable to stop the Serbian expansion in Macedonia. Fine writes that although sources mention no territorial changes, many scholars believe that the Serbs seized Niš and the surrounding region in the aftermath of the battle.

The battle of Velbazhd initiated a period of twenty years when Serbia was the dominant power in the Balkans for the first time. Their new king, Stefan Dušan, conquered Macedonia, Epirus, and Thessaly in 1331, and he was crowned Tsar (Emperor) in 1346. After he died in 1355, his state was divided into several independent states. Same happened in Bulgaria during the rule of Ivan Alexander in 1371. In the 15th century both states were conquered by the Ottoman Turks.

== Conflicts ==
Conflict	Time period	Bulgarian commander	Serbian commander	Result
Bulgar–Serb War (839–842)	839–842	Presian	Vlastimir	Serbian victory
Bulgar–Serb War (853)	853	Vladimir-Rasate	Mutimir	Serbian victory
Invasion of the Principality of Serbia from the Bulgarian Empire by the pretender to the Serbian throne Klonimir	897-898	Klonimir	Petar Gojniković	Serbian victory
Bulgar–Serbian wars of 917–924	917	Simeon I	Petar	Bulgarian victory
Bulgar–Serbian wars of 917–924	921	Simeon I	Pavle	Bulgarian victory
Bulgar–Serbian wars of 917–924	924	Marmais and Theodore Sigritsa	Zaharija	Serbian victory
Bulgar–Serbian wars of 917–924	924	Simeon I	Zaharija	Bulgarian victory and conquest of the early medieval Serbian principality
Liberation of the Principality of Serbia from the Bulgar rule	(933-934)	Bulgarian Empire	Serbian Principality	Serbian victory Prince Česlav, with a small group of followers, takes possession of the Serbian Principality and submits to the overlordship of Byzantine emperor Romanos I Lekapenos
Bulgarian-Serb War	998	Samuil	Jovan Vladimir	Bulgarian victory, conquest Duklja
Bulgarian-Serb War	1203	Kaloyan	Vukan Nemanjić	Bulgarian victory
Joint Bulgarian-Latin invasion of The Grand Principality of Serbia	1214	Strez	Stefan the First-Crowned	Serbian victory
Ivan Asen's II raid against Serbia	1230	Ivan Asen II	Stefan Radoslav	Bulgarian victory
Bulgarian-Serbian War	1283	Darman and Kudelin	Stefan Milutin	Serbian victory
Bulgarian-Serbian War	1284	Darman and Kudelin	Stefan Dragutin	Bulgarian victory
Bulgarian-Serbian War	1291	Shishman I	Stefan Milutin	Serbian victory, Milutin successfully defends Ždrelo
Bulgarian-Serbian War	1292	Shishman I	Stefan Milutin	Serbian victory, conquest of Vidin
Battle of Velbazhd	1330	Michael Shishman	Stefan Dečanski	Serbian victory

== See also ==
- Byzantine–Serbian wars
- Serbian–Ottoman wars
- Bulgarian–Hungarian wars
- Byzantine–Bulgarian wars
- Croatian–Bulgarian wars
- Bulgarian–Ottoman wars
- Duklja
- First Bulgarian Empire
- Grand Principality of Serbia
- Medieval Bulgarian army
- Medieval Serbian army
- Second Bulgarian Empire
- Serbian Empire

== Notes ==
According to historian John Van Antwerp Fine Jr. after the battle of Velbazhd "though Bulgaria was weaker than Serbia, it did not suffer any legal dependence. It was simply an independent, less powerful, and generally allied state".

== Sources ==
Primary sources

- Moravcsik, Gyula, ed. (1967) [1949]. Constantine Porphyrogenitus: De Administrando Imperio (2nd revised ed.). Washington D.C.: Dumbarton Oaks Center for Byzantine Studies. ISBN 9780884020219.
- Uzelac, Aleksandar (2011). "Tatars and Serbs at the End of the Thirteenth Century". Revista de Istorie Militară (5/6): 9–20.
- Шишић, Фердо, ed. (1928). Летопис Попа Дукљанина (Chronicle of the Priest of Duklja). Београд-Загреб: Српска краљевска академија.
- Кунчер, Драгана (2009). Gesta Regum Sclavorum. Vol. 1. Београд-Никшић: Историјски институт, Манастир Острог.
- Живковић, Тибор (2009). Gesta Regum Sclavorum. Vol. 2. Београд-Никшић: Историјски институт, Манастир Острог.

Secondary sources

- Bury, John B. (2008) [1912]. History of the Eastern Empire from the Fall of Irene to the Accession of Basil: A.D. 802–867. New York: Cosimo. ISBN 978-1-60520-421-5.
- Ćirković, Sima (2004). The Serbs. Malden: Blackwell Publishing. ISBN 9781405142915.
- Curta, Florin (2006). Southeastern Europe in the Middle Ages, 500–1250. Cambridge: Cambridge University Press. ISBN 9780521815390.
- Fine, John Van Antwerp Jr. (1991) [1983]. The Early Medieval Balkans: A Critical Survey from the Sixth to the Late Twelfth Century. Ann Arbor, Michigan: University of Michigan Press. ISBN 0-472-08149-7.
- Fine, John Van Antwerp Jr. (1994) [1987]. The Late Medieval Balkans: A Critical Survey from the Late Twelfth Century to the Ottoman Conquest. Ann Arbor, Michigan: University of Michigan Press. ISBN 0-472-10079-3.
- Živković, Tibor (2007). "The Golden Seal of Stroimir" (PDF). Historical Review. 55. Belgrade: The Institute for History: 23–29. Archived from the original (PDF) on 24 March 2018.
- (in Bulgarian) Zlatarski, V. History of the Bulgarian state in the Middle Ages: Part 1, IInd edition Sofia, 1971
- (in Bulgarian) Zlatarski, V. History of the Bulgarian state in the Middle Ages: Part 2, IInd edition Sofia, 1971
- (in English) Runciman, S. A history of the First Bulgarian Empire, G. Bell & Sons, London 1930
- (in Bulgarian) Andreev, J. The Bulgarian Khans and Tsars (Balgarskite hanove i tsare, Българските ханове и царе), Veliko Tarnovo, 1996 ISBN 954-427-216-X
- (in Bulgarian) "История на България.Том ІІІ – Втора българска държава" – Издателство на БАН, 1982 г.
