= Pavle Branović =

Serbian ruler in the 10th century

- archon (ἄρχων)
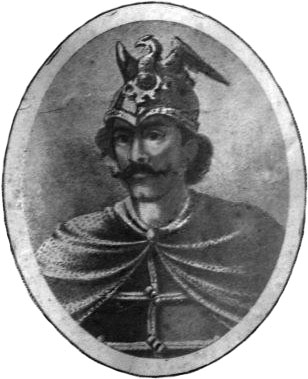
- 1902 artistic illustration of Pavle

Prince of Serbia
- Reign: 917/918–921
- Predecessor: Petar
- Successor: Zaharija
- Born: 870s Serbia
- Died: 921 (aged 40s); Serbia
- Dynasty: Vlastimirović
- Father: Bran
- Religion: Christian

Pavle Branović (Serbian: Павле Брановић; c. 870s–921) was the ruler of Serbia from 917/918 to 921. Pavle belonged to the exiled main branch of the Serbian dynasty, as the son of prince Bran (r. 891–892) who tried to take the throne from Petar Gojniković (r. 892–917/918) but failed and was blinded. The Bulgarian emperor Simeon I sent an army which defeated Petar, and he instated Pavle. After fighting off a Byzantine-organized coup of his relative Zaharija, he himself switched sides to Byzantium and became hostile to Bulgaria. The Bulgars now sent Zaharija, who Pavle had handed over as a political hostage, and he managed to oust Pavle in 921. His fate is unknown after this.

== History ==
The history of the Serbian principalities and the Vlastimirović dynasty is known from the De Administrando Imperio (DAI) compiled by Byzantine emperor Constantine VII Porphyrogenitus (r. 913–959) between 948 and 952. Serbia and Bulgaria came into contact in the mid-9th century, and Bulgaria had up until then expanded their territory in the Balkan interior by taking Byzantine territory. Byzantium and Bulgaria also had a rivalry regarding influence on the peoples in the central Balkans. The DAI speaks of changing outcomes in 9th-century Bulgar–Serb conflicts, which themselves were a consequence and reflection of the Byzantine–Bulgarian wars. When Serbian ruler Vlastimir died, the rule of Serbia was divided among his sons Mutimir, Strojimir and Gojnik. The division of land shows patrimonialism in the ruling family, also found among some other early medieval peoples; while the territory of each brother is unknown, Mutimir, as the oldest, would have primacy among the three.

Some time after the Second Bulgar–Serb War in the 860s, the three sons of Vlastimir came into conflict and Mutimir captured his two brothers Strojimir and Gojnik, stripped them of their rule, and expelled them to Bulgaria. Mutimir's oldest son Prvoslav ruled in 891–892, until Petar Gojniković (Gojnik's son) took the throne in 892, forcing Prvoslav and his brothers Bran and Stefan to flee to Croatia. Pavle was the son of Bran, and was born in the 870s. Three years after Petar took the throne, in 895, Bran (Pavle's father) arrived and entered war with Petar, but he was defeated, captured, and blinded by Petar. Bran's attempt suggests that Prvoslav, the oldest in his line, perhaps died, or retired in Byzantine capital Constantinople. Next, in 897, Strojimir's son Klonimir tried to take the Serbian throne, entered war, took the city of Drstnik (Destinikon) but was defeated and killed in battle. Petar ruled without interference for the next twenty years. The fate of Bran is unknown. It is possible that Petar sent the blinded Bran as a political hostage to Simeon after their peace agreement some time after 897. The blinding of Bran shows an adoption of the Byzantine tradition, but the killing of Klonimir speaks of there not being a regulated punishment for coup attempts by pretenders in Serbia during the Vlastimirović.

In late 917 or 917/918 the Bulgarian emperor Simeon I sent an army led by Theodore Sigritsa and Marmais, accompanied by Pavle, that had Petar ousted and imprisoned in Bulgaria, where Petar died, and Pavle succeeded the Serbian throne. This is dated closely after the Battle of Achelous (917). The DAI calls Pavle an archontopoulos (ἀρχοντόπουλος, "son of the archon", meaning "prince"), meaning he belonged to the Serbian dynasty. The legitimacy of Pavle was not challenged among the župani, which shows that primogeniture or secundogeniture was less important in the 10th century and that belonging to the Serbian dynasty sufficed. Pavle began his rule as a loyal subject of Simeon, which meant that the Bulgarian threat to Serbia was gone. Bulgaria was winning in the Byzantine–Bulgarian struggle following their victory at Achelous, and their precedence is also seen in their influence in Serbia and Pavle. At this time, Zahumlje was independently ruled by dux Michael (fl. 912–927), who had allied with Bulgaria against Petar Gojniković. In December 920, the admiral Romanos Lekapenos who had been part of the regency for the minor Constantine VII, rose to become the Byzantine emperor. Romanos understood that Byzantium needed Serbia to open a front in the west of Bulgaria to counter Simeon.

In the beginning of 921, Romanos Lekapenos sent archontopoulos Zaharija from Constantinople to take the Serbian throne (...πρὸς τὸ γενέσθαι ἄρχοντα ἐν Σερβλίᾳ...). Zaharija must have had a considerable army and took the route which avoided Bulgarian territory, that is, via Byzantine-held Dyrrachion and Duklja into what is today northeastern Montenegro. Pavle defeated Zaharija in battle, captured him, and handed him over to the Bulgars. Pavle however switched sides and became hostile to Bulgaria, and this was a result of Byzantine politics in the wider area of the Serb (Dalmatian) principalities, as well as internal discord and external pressure. For instance, Michael in Zahumlje was a Bulgarian ally and rival to Pavle, and perhaps Pavle could push him aside with Byzantine help. Apart from this, only recognition from Rome and Constantinople, and not Bulgaria, really mattered in the Christian world.

That same year, in 921, the Bulgars now decided to send Zaharija to take the Serbian throne from Pavle, and he succeeded. Simeon thus secured his western frontier and could continue the offensive against Thrace and Constantinople. Zaharija however immediately (πάραυτα) returned as a subject of Byzantium, as he did not wish to subordinate himself to the Bulgars, and it would also lend him the legitimacy and primacy among the Serb principalities. Zaharija sided with Byzantium despite its defeats at the hands of the Bulgars.

== Aftermath ==
Bulgarian emperor Simeon reacted to Zaharija's alliance with Byzantium by sending the commanders Theodore Sigritsa and Marmais, as he had done in 917/918 against Petar, to now eliminate Zaharija, some time between 921 and 923, during the ongoing Byzantine–Bulgarian war. The Bulgar army was decisively defeated, with Zaharija sending war trophies to emperor Romanos in Constantinople as a sign of triumph.

== Legacy ==
In late May 1896 the Zagreb national theatre hosted the drama tragedy Simeun Veliki ("Simeon the Great") of A. Tresić surrounding events of Simeon I and Serbia and Croatia; Pavle Branović and Zaharija were among the characters. Stevan Sremac (1855–1906) authored the historic novel series Iz knjiga starostavnih, which includes the Vlastimirović dynasty (and Pavle Branović) as characters.

== See also ==
- List of Serbian monarchs

== Annotations ==
1. The name Pavle (Павле) is biblical. It is rendered Παῦλος (transliterated as Paulos) in DAI. He is also known in historiography with his patronymic, as Pavle Branović (Павле Брановић).
2. In historiography, the account on them finding refuge in Croatia is deemed illogical as it was the location of departure of the usurper Petar Gojniković. T. Živković too, believed that it was a transcription error and should say Bulgaria instead of Croatia. P. Komatina deemed it unlikely that it was a transcription error.
3. T. Živković (2006) dated Pavle's reign from 917 to 923, for six years; Simeon's dispatch of Zaharija to 923. P. Komatina refuted the previous views and dated Pavle's reign from 917/918 to 921, for three years, as DAI says (Еἶτα μετὰ χρόνους τρεῖς), and that Zaharija was sent the first time by Romanos in the beginning of 921, and the second time by Simeon that same year.

== Sources ==
- Komatina, Predrag (2021). Константин Порфирогенит и рана историја Јужних Словена [Constantine Porphyrogenitus and the Early History of South Slavs]. Византолошки институт, Београд. ISBN 978-86-83883-28-8.
- Komatina, Predrag (2015). "О српско-бугарској граници у IX и X веку". Зборник радова Византолошког института. 52: 31–42. ISSN 2406-0917.
- Pavlović, Bojana (2025). "The Balkans between Byzantium and Bulgaria". In Krsmanović, Bojana (ed.). Barbarians, Rhomaioi and those in between: integrating the Christians of the Central Balkans into the Byzantine Empire (late 10th–mid-13th Century). Vol. 1. Institute for Byzantine Studies. doi:10.46793/barb.rhom.i.007p. ISBN 978-86-83883-29-5.
- Uzelac, Aleksandar (2018). "Prince Michael of Zahumlje – a Serbian ally of tsar Symeon". In Nikolov, Angel; Kanev, Nikolay (eds.). Emperor Symeon's Bulgaria in the History of Europe's South-East: 1100 years from the Battle of Achelous. St Kliment Ohridski University Press, Sofia. pp. 236–245 – via Academia.edu.
- Živković, Tibor (2006). Портрети српских владара: IX-XII век [Portraits of Serbian Rulers: IX-XII century]. Завод за уџбенике и наставна средства, Београд. ISBN 9788617137548.
- Živković, Vojislav (2020). "Улога ослепљења у политичком животу средњовековне Србије" [The role of blinding in the political life of Medieval Serbia] (PDF). Пешчаник - часопис Нишког архива. 19.

Pavle Vlastimirović dynasty Born: 870s Died: 921
Regnal titles
Preceded by Petar	Prince of Serbia; 917/918–921	Succeeded by Zaharija
