= Vlastimirović dynasty =

First Serbian royal dynasty

Vlastimirović Властимировић
- Royal house
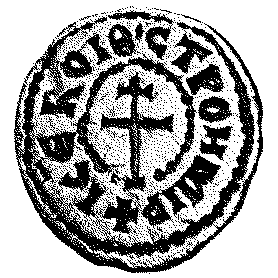
- Seal of prince Strojimir of Serbia, from the late 9th century
- Country: Serbian Principality
- Founded: 7th century c. 626; 1400 years ago
- Founder: unnamed 7th-century Serbian ruler Višeslav (first known by name); Vlastimir (eponymous)
- Final ruler: Časlav († 940s/960s)
- Titles: Archon (ἄρχων), rendered "Prince"
- Style: "Prince of the Serbs"
- Dissolution: 940s/960s

The House of Vlastimirović (Serbian Cyrillic: Властимировић, pl. Vlastimirovići / Властимировићи) was the first Serbian royal dynasty, named after Prince Vlastimir (ruled c. 831–851), who was recognized by the Byzantine Empire. The dynasty was established with the unnamed 7th-century Serbian ruler, who ruled during the reign of Emperor Heraclius (610–641).

The Vlastimirović dynasty ruled in Serbia until the 940s/960s, when some of the Serbian lands were annexed by the Byzantine Empire.

== History ==
One of the fundamental sources for the early Serbian history is the work of Byzantine Emperor Constantine VII Porphyrogenitos (913–959), De Administrando Imperio. In eight chapters, the settlement of Serbs and their early history is described up until the reign of the author. The 32nd chapter, with the sub-chapter On the Serbs and the lands that they currently inhabit, gives a short note on the origin of the Serbs, their homeland, and continues with the history of members of the oldest ruling family of the Serbs.

=== Early rulers ===
The progenitor, according to Porphyrogenitos, was the prince (unnamed in sources and thus designated as the unnamed 7th-century Serbian ruler) that led the Serbs to Southeastern Europe during the reign of Heraclius (610–641). The author gives the early genealogy: "As the Serb Prince who fled to Emperor Heraclius" in the time "when Bulgaria was under the Rhōmaíōn" (thus, before the establishment of Bulgaria in 680), "by succession, his son, and then grandson, and so on, of his family rules as princes. After some years, Višeslav is born, and from him Radoslav, and from him Prosigoj, and from him Vlastimir". The time and circumstances of the first three rulers are almost unknown. It is supposed that Višeslav ruled in c. 780, but it is unclear when Radoslav and Prosigoj would have ruled. When the Serbs were mentioned in 822 in the Royal Frankish Annals ("the Serbs, which is said to be holding the great part of Dalmatia"; ad Sorabos, quae natio magnam Dalmatiae partem obtinere dicitur) one of those two must have ruled Serbia. According to John (Jr.) Fine, it was hard to find Serbs in this area since the Byzantine sources were limited to the southern coast, also it is possible that among other tribes exists tribe of group of small tribes of Serbs. Dalmatia, in the antique period, stretched from modern-day Dalmatia far into the hinterland, northwards close to the Sava river, and eastwards to the Ibar river. Višeslav's great-grandson Vlastimir began his rule in c. 830, and he is the oldest Serbian ruler on which there is substantial data.

=== Vlastimir, Mutimir and Pribislav ===
Vlastimir united the Serbian tribes in the vicinity. The Serbs were alarmed, and most likely consolidated due to the spreading of the Bulgarian Khanate towards their borders (a rapid conquest of neighbouring Slavs,) in self-defence, and possibly sought to cut off the Bulgar expansion to the south. Byzantine Emperor Theophilos (r. 829–842) was recognized as the nominal suzerain (overlord) of the Serbs, and most likely encouraged them to thwart the Bulgarians. The thirty-year-peace treaty between the Byzantines and Bulgarians, signed in 815, was still in effect.

According to Constantine VII, the Serbs and Bulgarians had lived peacefully as neighbours until the invasion in 839 (in the last years of Theophilos). It is not known what exactly prompted the war, as Porphyrogenitus gives no clear answer; whether it was a result of Serbian-Bulgarian relations, i.e., the Bulgar conquest to the southeast, or a result of the Byzantine-Bulgarian rivalry, in which Serbia was allied with the Byzantines. According to John B. Bury, it was not unlikely that the Emperor had a part in it; as he was at war with the Arabs, he may have pushed the Serbs to drive the Bulgarians from western Macedonia, which would benefit them both—hence, Malamir's action. V. Zlatarski supposed that the Emperor offered the Serbs complete independence in return. According to Porphyrogenitus, the Bulgarians wanted to continue their conquest of the Slav lands - to force the Serbs into subjugation. Presian I (r. 836–852) launched an invasion into Serbian territory in 839, which led to a war that lasted for three years, in which the Serbs were victorious; Presian was heavily defeated and lost a large number of his men, made no territorial gains and was driven out by the army of Vlastimir. It is believed that the Serbs held out in their defensible forests and gorges, and knew how to fight in the hills. According to Živković, it is possible that the Bulgarian attack came after the failed invasion of Struma and Nestos in 846 (see below): Presian may have collected his army and headed for Serbia, and Vlastimir may have participated in the Byzantine–Bulgarian Wars, which would mean that Presian was responding to a direct Serbian involvement.

After the victory over the Bulgarians, Vlastimir's status rose, and according to Fine, he went on to expand to the west, taking Bosnia and Herzegovina (Zahumlje). Vlastimir married off his daughter to Krajina, the son of a local župan of Trebinje, Beloje, in c. 847–48. With this marriage, Vlastimir elevated Krajina to archon. The Belojević family was granted the rule of Travunija. Krajina had a son with Vlastimir's daughter, named Hvalimir, who would later on succeed as župan of Travunia. Vlastimir's elevation of Krajina and the practical independence of Travunija show, according to Živković, that Vlastimir was a Christian ruler who very well understood the monarchical ideology that developed in the early Middle Ages.

Soon after 846, with the end of the thirty-year-truce, Malamir (or Presian) invaded the regions of the Struma and the Nestos, and Empress-Regent Theodora (r. 842–855, the wife of Theophilos) answered by attacking Thracian Bulgaria. A brief peace was concluded, then Malamir proceeded to invade Macedonia. The Bulgarians also imposed their rule on the Morava region, on the frontier between Serbia and the Bulgarian Khanate. The Byzantines were also active in the hinterland of Dalmatia, to the west of Serbia; the strategos of the cities of Dalmatia came into conflict with a Frankish vassal, the Croatian Duke Trpimir, in 846 or 848, in which the strategos was defeated.

The defeat of the Bulgarians, who had become one of the greater powers in the 9th century, shows that Serbia was an organized state, fully capable of defending its borders, and possessing a very high military and administrative organizational structure. It is not known whether Serbia at the time of Vlastimir had a system of fortifications or a developed military organization with clearly defined roles for the župan.

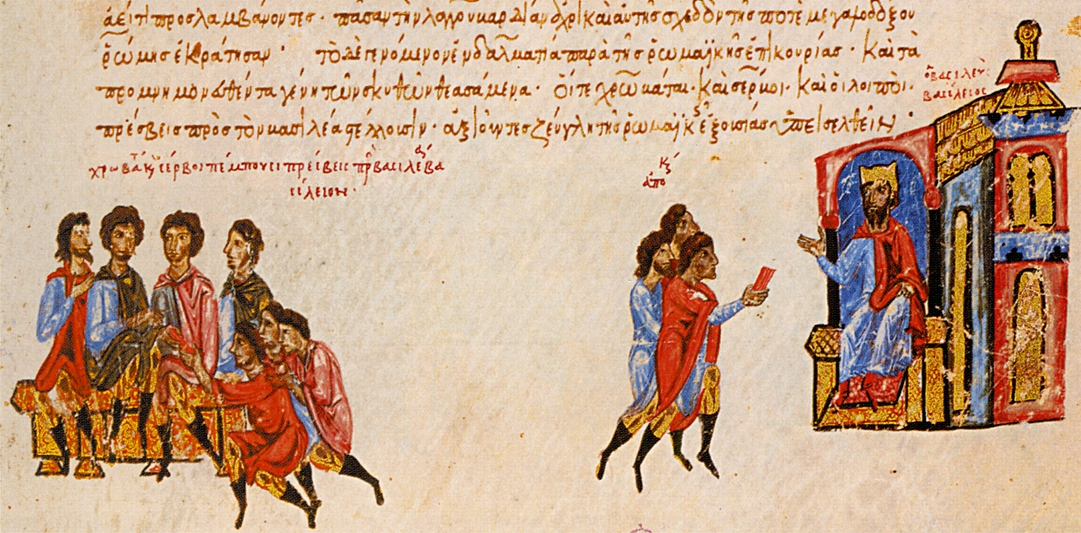
Emperor Basil I receiving delegations of Serbs and Croats.

Prince Mutimir (ruled c. 851–891), the son of Vlastimir, managed to defeat the Bulgarians once again in 834–835, also capturing the son of the Bulgar Khan. The Serbs and Bulgarians made peace. The remaining years were marked by internal dynastic wars. In 892, prince Pribislav Mutimirović was overthrown by his cousin, prince Petar Gojniković. By the middle of the 9th century, the process of Christianization of Serbia was finalized.

=== Petar, Pavle, Zaharija and Časlav ===
Prince Petar Gojniković was recognized by the Bulgarians, the greatest power in Southeastern Europe at the start of the 10th century, although the peace was not to last; the Byzantines had sent an envoy to Serbia promising greater independence in return for Petar leading an army against the Bulgarians. A Bulgarian ally, Mihajlo Višević, who had seen a threat in Petar during the latter's conquest of Neretva, heard of the possible alliance and warned the Bulgarian Tzar, who later sent a protege, Pavle Branović, to rule Serbia. In the meantime, Zaharija Pribislavljević was sent by the Byzantines to take the Serbian throne, but he was captured by Pavle and sent to Bulgaria. Pavle was then approached by the Byzantines, and so Zaharija was persuaded by the Bulgarians to switch sides. Pavle planned an attack on Bulgaria, but Tzar Simeon was warned again, and dispatched Zaharija with an army, promising him the throne if he defeated Pavle, which he did. Zaharija soon resumed his Byzantine alliance, also uniting several Slavic tribes along the common border to revolt against the Bulgarians. Several Bulgarian generals were beheaded, their heads sent to Constantinople by Zaharija as a symbol of allegiance. In 924 a large Bulgarian army led by Časlav Klonimirović, the second cousin, ravaged Serbia, forcing Zaharija to flee. Instead of instating Časlav, however the Bulgarians annexed Serbia between 924 and 927.

Prince Časlav took the throne in 933, seven years after the Croatian–Bulgarian battle of 926. Eastern Orthodox influence greatly increased and Časlav maintained close ties with the Byzantines throughout his reign. The written information about the first dynasty ends with the death of Časlav.

== Aftermath ==
The Catepanate of Ras was established between 971 and 976, during the rule of John Tzimiskes (r. 969–976). A seal of a strategos of Ras has been dated to Tzimiskes' reign, making it possible that Tzimiskes' predecessor Nikephoros II Phokas was recognized in Rascia. The protospatharios and katepano of Ras was a Byzantine governor named John. Data on the katepano of Ras during Tzimiskes' reign is missing. Byzantine military presence ended soon thereafter with the wars with Bulgaria, and was re-established only ca. 1018 with the short-lived Theme of Sirmium, which, however, did not extend much into Serbia proper.

== Family tree ==
- unnamed 7th-century Serbian ruler (~610–641+), Leader of Serbs and their Byzantine Sclaviniae under Heraclius.
  - Several generations
    - Višeslav (c. 780)
      - Radoslav (~800–822)
        - Prosigoj (822–836)
          - Vlastimir (836–~850) (Founder), Defeated the Bulgarians in the Bulgar–Serb War (839–842).
            - Mutimir (~850 – † 891–893), Defeated the Bulgarians in the Bulgar–Serb War (853).
              - Pribislav Mutimirović, ruled (~891–893)
                - Zaharija (921–924), brought to the throne by the Byzantines, removed by the Bulgarians
              - Bran Mutimirović, pretender to the throne 895–6
                - Pavle (~917–921), brought to the throne by the Bulgarians, brought down by Byzantines
              - Stefan Mutimirović
            - Strojimir, vassal to Mutimir, later under Bulgarian khan Boris
              - Klonimir,
                - Časlav (933–943/960), liberated Serbian lands under Bulgarian occupation, unified Serbia
            - Gojnik, vassal to brother Mutimir, later under khan Boris)
              - Petar Gojniković (~892–918), captured by Bulgarians, died in captivity.
            - Daughter, married Krajina Belojević

== See also ==
- List of Serbian monarchs
- History of Serbia
- History of the Serbs

== Annotations ==
1. In historiography, the dynasty is known as Vlastimirović (Serbian Cyrillic: Властимировић, pl. Vlastimirovići / Властимировићи), a patronymic derived from Vlastimir. It is occasionally named Višeslavić (Serbian Cyrillic: Вишеславић, pl. Višeslavići / Вишеславићи) or Vojislavić (Serbian Cyrillic: Војиславић, pl. Vojislavići / Војиславићи), after Višeslav or Vojislav, Vlastimir's great-grandfather. It is also known as the "old Serbian dynasty".

== Sources ==
Primary

- Ферјанчић, Божидар (1959). "Константин VII Порфирогенит". Византиски извори за историју народа Југославије. Vol. 2. Београд: Византолошки институт. pp. 1–98.
- Кунчер, Драгана (2009). Gesta Regum Sclavorum. Vol. 1. Београд-Никшић: Историјски институт, Манастир Острог.
- Moravcsik, Gyula, ed. (1967) [1949]. Constantine Porphyrogenitus: De Administrando Imperio (2nd revised ed.). Washington D.C.: Dumbarton Oaks Center for Byzantine Studies.
- Pertz, Georg Heinrich, ed. (1845). Einhardi Annales. Hanover.
- Scholz, Bernhard Walter, ed. (1970). Carolingian Chronicles: Royal Frankish Annals and Nithard's Histories. University of Michigan Press.
- Шишић, Фердо, ed. (1928). Летопис Попа Дукљанина (Chronicle of the Priest of Duklja). Београд-Загреб: Српска краљевска академија.
- Живковић, Тибор (2009). Gesta Regum Sclavorum. Vol. 2. Београд-Никшић: Историјски институт, Манастир Острог.

Secondary

- Bury, John B. (1912). A History of the Eastern Empire from the Fall of Irene to the Accession of Basil I. (A.D. 802-867). London: MacMillan.
- Ćirković, Sima (2004). The Serbs. Malden: Blackwell Publishing.
- Curta, Florin (2006). Southeastern Europe in the Middle Ages, 500–1250. Cambridge: Cambridge University Press.
- Fine, John Van Antwerp Jr. (1991) [1983]. The Early Medieval Balkans: A Critical Survey from the Sixth to the Late Twelfth Century. Ann Arbor, Michigan: University of Michigan Press.
- Janković, Đorđe (2004). "The Slavs in the 6th Century North Illyricum". Гласник Српског археолошког друштва. 20: 39–61.
- Komatina, Predrag (2010). "The Slavs of the mid-Danube basin and the Bulgarian expansion in the first half of the 9th century" (PDF). Зборник радова Византолошког института. 47: 55–82.
- Komatina, Predrag (2015). "The Church in Serbia at the Time of Cyrilo-Methodian Mission in Moravia". Cyril and Methodius: Byzantium and the World of the Slavs. Thessaloniki: Dimos. pp. 711–718.
- Krsmanović, Bojana (2008). The Byzantine Province in Change: On the Threshold Between the 10th and the 11th Century. Belgrade: Institute for Byzantine Studies.
- Obolensky, Dimitri (1974) [1971]. The Byzantine Commonwealth: Eastern Europe, 500-1453. London: Cardinal.
- Ostrogorsky, George (1956). History of the Byzantine State. Oxford: Basil Blackwell.
- Runciman, Steven (1930). A History of the First Bulgarian Empire. London: G. Bell & Sons.
- Runciman, Steven (1988) [1929]. The Emperor Romanus Lecapenus and His Reign: A Study of Tenth-Century Byzantium. Cambridge University Press.
- Samardžić, Radovan; Duškov, Milan, eds. (1993). Serbs in European Civilization. Belgrade: Nova, Serbian Academy of Sciences and Arts, Institute for Balkan Studies.
- Stephenson, Paul (2000). Byzantium's Balkan Frontier: A Political Study of the Northern Balkans, 900–1204. Cambridge: Cambridge University Press.
- Stephenson, Paul (2003a). The Legend of Basil the Bulgar-Slayer. Cambridge: Cambridge University Press.
- Stephenson, Paul (2003b). "The Balkan Frontier in the Year 1000". Byzantium in the Year 1000. BRILL. pp. 109–134.
- Treadgold, Warren T. (1997). A History of the Byzantine State and Society. Stanford, California: Stanford University Press.
- Vlasto, Alexis P. (1970). The Entry of the Slavs into Christendom: An Introduction to the Medieval History of the Slavs. Cambridge: Cambridge University Press.
- Живковић, Тибор (2000). Словени и Ромеји: Славизација на простору Србије од VII до XI века (The Slavs and the Romans). Београд: Историјски институт САНУ, Службени гласник.
- Живковић, Тибор (2002). Јужни Словени под византијском влашћу 600-1025 (South Slavs under the Byzantine Rule 600-1025). Београд: Историјски институт САНУ, Службени гласник.
- Живковић, Тибор (2004). Црквена организација у српским земљама: Рани средњи век (Organization of the Church in Serbian Lands: Early Middle Ages). Београд: Историјски институт САНУ, Службени гласник.
- Живковић, Тибор (2006). Портрети српских владара: IX-XII век (Portraits of Serbian Rulers: IX-XII Century). Београд: Завод за уџбенике и наставна средства.
- Živković, Tibor (2007). "The Golden Seal of Stroimir" (PDF). Historical Review. 55. Belgrade: The Institute for History: 23–29.
- Živković, Tibor (2008). Forging unity: The South Slavs between East and West 550-1150. Belgrade: The Institute of History, Čigoja štampa.
- Živković, Tibor (2011). "The Origin of the Royal Frankish Annalist's Information about the Serbs in Dalmatia". Homage to Academician Sima Ćirković. Belgrade: The Institute for History. pp. 381–398.
- Živković, Tibor (2012). De conversione Croatorum et Serborum: A Lost Source. Belgrade: The Institute of History.
- Živković, Tibor (2013a). "On the Baptism of the Serbs and Croats in the Time of Basil I (867–886)" (PDF). Studia Slavica et Balcanica Petropolitana (1): 33–53.
- Živković, Tibor (2013b). "The Urban Landcape [sic] of Early Medieval Slavic Principalities in the Territories of the Former Praefectura Illyricum and in the Province of Dalmatia (ca. 610-950)". The World of the Slavs: Studies of the East, West and South Slavs: Civitas, Oppidas, Villas and Archeological Evidence (7th to 11th Centuries AD). Belgrade: The Institute for History. pp. 15–36.
