= Petar of Serbia =

Serbian ruler from 892 to 917

Petar
- archon (ἄρχων)
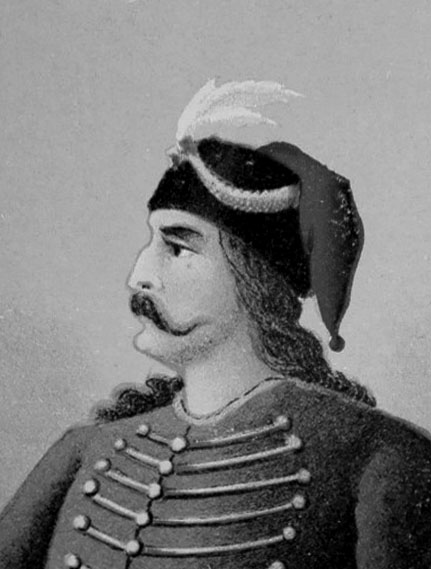
- 1902 artistic illustration of Petar

Prince of Serbia
- Reign: 892–917
- Predecessor: Prvoslav
- Successor: Pavle
- Born: 850s–860s Serbia
- Died: after 917; First Bulgarian Empire
Names
- Petar Gojniković
- Dynasty: Vlastimirović
- Father: Gojnik
- Religion: Christian

Petar (Serbian: Петар; fl. 892–917) was the ruler of Serbia from 892 to 917. Petar belonged to a younger line of the Serbian dynasty, as the son of prince Gojnik. His father and uncle were expelled by their brother Mutimir after a conflict. Petar ousted his cousin Prvoslav in 892, was legitimized by Byzantine emperor Leo VI the Wise, and managed to defend his throne several times against other Serbian princes backed by Bulgaria. He was finally ousted after 25 years of rule, by the son of another cousin who he had earlier blinded.

== Background and early life ==
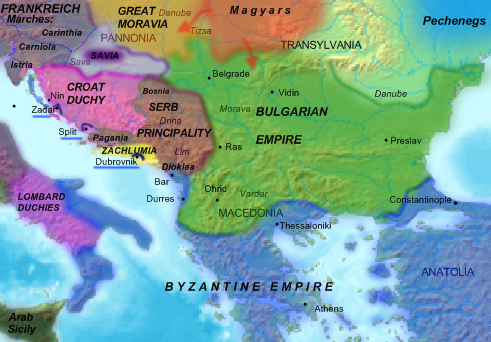
Map of Peter's Serbia

The history of the Serbian principalities and the Vlastimirović dynasty is known from the De Administrando Imperio (DAI) compiled by Byzantine emperor Constantine VII Porphyrogenitus (r. 913–959) between 948 and 952. Serbia and Bulgaria came into contact in the mid-9th century, and Bulgaria had up until then expanded their territory in the Balkan interior by taking Byzantine territory. Byzantium and Bulgaria also had a rivalry regarding influence on the peoples in the central Balkans. The DAI speaks of changing outcomes in 9th-century Bulgar–Serb conflicts, which themselves were a consequence and reflection of the Byzantine–Bulgarian wars. When Serbian ruler Vlastimir died, the rule of Serbia was divided among his sons Mutimir, Strojimir and Gojnik. The division of land shows patrimonialism in the ruling family, also found among some other early medieval peoples; while the territory of each brother is unknown, Mutimir, as the oldest, would have primacy among the three.

Some time after the Second Bulgar–Serb War in the 860s, the three sons of Vlastimir came into conflict and Mutimir captured his two brothers Strojimir and Gojnik, stripped them of their rule, and expelled them to Bulgaria. Mutimir had signed peace with Bulgar khan Boris and thereby directed Serbian foreign policy. It is possible that Mutimir expelled his brothers as they sought an anti-Bulgarian political course. Strojimir and Gojnik, as political hostages, were a guarantee of Serbian political relations with Bulgaria. Petar was the son of Gojnik (Πέτρος ό υιός του Γοϊνίκου), the youngest of the three brothers. Petar was younger than twelve at the time of his father's rebellion, which means he could not have inherited an appanage nor supported his uncle Mutimir against his father. Mutimir decided to keep Petar by his side, as a political hostage, to refrain Strojimir and Gojnik from attempting to take the Serbian throne. A collective family responsibility in the case of rebellion is known even from the 14th century (in the case of Stefan Milutin's sending off Stefan Dečanski and his minor son Stefan Dušan), which means that in the early Middle ages, when penalties would be harsher, Petar wouldn't have been freed from responsibility for his father's rebellion.

Either when he had grown up, or shortly after the expulsion of his father, Petar escaped to Croatia. His flight suggests he had restricted movement, as a punishment for the rebellion against Mutimir. It is unclear why he went to Croatia and not Bulgaria where his father was; he might have been held in the western Serbian lands, far from the Serbian–Bulgarian border. The Serbian foreign policy changed by the time Basil I (r. 867–886) succeeded as Byzantine emperor. Under Basil, Byzantium reestablished supreme authority also over Croatia. Mutimir was succeeded, as per primogeniture, by his oldest son Prvoslav upon his death in 891. Prvoslav's younger brothers Bran and Stefan likely held specific functions in the state, as Mutimir's brothers had before. By this time, Serbia was an organized state, evident by the resistance to the powerful Bulgars, which required military organization, fortification system and command hierarchy.

== Reign ==
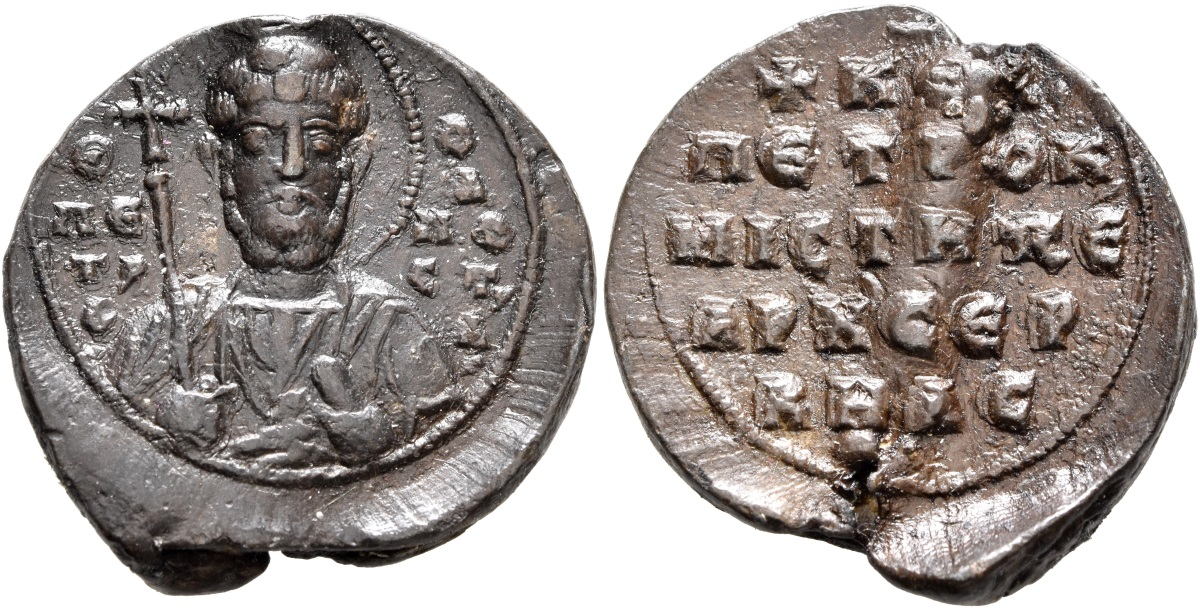
Seal of arhont Petar Gojniković in 9th century or seal of strategios of Serbia in 9th century

Prvoslav ruled only shortly, in 891–892, until his cousin (ἐξάδελφος) Petar returned and took the throne in 892, forcing Prvoslav, Bran and Stefan to flee to Croatia. It is evident that Petar awaited the moment Mutimir died to return and take the throne. T. Živković theorized that Petar perhaps was aided by Croatian ruler Branimir (who died in 892). The DAI speaks of Petar subjecting himself to Leo VI the Wise (r. 886–912), the father of Constantine VII who compiled the DAI. Firmer Byzantine relations in the Serbian lands is also evident from archaeological material. Legitimizing his reign through Byzantium, Petar secured his position as the strongest and most important among all Serb (and Dalmatian) rulers.

Three years after Petar took the throne, in 895, Bran arrived and entered war with Petar, but he was defeated, captured, and blinded by Petar. Bran's attempt suggests that Prvoslav, the oldest in his line, perhaps died, or retired in Byzantine capital Constantinople. Next, in 897, Strojimir's son Klonimir tried to take the Serbian throne, entered war, took the city of Dostinik (Destinikon) but was defeated and killed in battle. It is unclear if, and how much, support Klonimir would have from Bulgaria in his coup attempt. In 894–896 the Bulgarian ruler Simeon I (r. 893–927) waged war against Byzantium, after which there was a firm peace from 896 to 913. There are views in historiography that the strategos of Dyrrachion held talks with Petar regarding an anti-Bulgarian military alliance already during that war. It is possible that Klonimir was sent in order for Simeon to avoid Petar joining the war on Byzantium's side and thwarting Bulgarian breakthrough to Dyrrachion.

Petar ruled without interference for the next twenty years. He was a loyal subject of emperor Leo VI. The DAI mentions how Petar "made a godfather" (ὥστε καὶ σύντεκνον αὐτὸν ἐποίησεν) of Simeon, but it is unclear how exactly, if Simeon was the godfather of Petar's child, or if Petar was the godfather of Simeon's son Peter (notably, his namesake) born in c. 900. It is possible that Petar sent the blinded Bran as a political hostage to Simeon after their peace agreement (the godfatherhood) some time after 897. The blinding of Bran shows an adoption of the Byzantine tradition of political mutilation, but the killing of Klonimir speaks of there not being a regulated punishment for coup attempts by pretenders in Serbia during the Vlastimirović. The foreign policy of Petar towards Byzantium and Bulgaria, as a loyal subject of Leo VI and godfatherhood with Simeon, is a reflection of the peaceful relations in the Balkans between 896 and 913.

According to the DAI, after the death of emperor Leo (912), the Byzantine strategos of Dyrrachion (who is identified in the DAI as Leo Rhabdouchos, although this is challenged in historiography), met and held talks with Petar in "Pagania" (Narentine land), which at the time was under Petar's rule. This is the earliest account on the governor of Dyrrachion acting as implementer of imperial politics in Serb lands (which is known to have been well-established in the 11th century). The Byzantine–Bulgarian war had started in 913, and the strategos most likely had the mission of gaining Petar's support in the war. At the time, Zahumlje, a principality in southern Dalmatia, was ruled by Michael, who according to the DAI "became jealous" and contacted Simeon and told him that the Byzantine emperor bribed Petar with gifts to bring with him the "Turks" (Hungarians) and attack Bulgaria. Thus, Petar was in the Byzantine camp and Michael was a Bulgarian ally. There is a view that Petar's holding of Narentine lands included also parts of Zahumlje west of the Neretva, which was yet another reason for Michael. Michael wished to rise to the top of the hierarchy in the southern Dalmatian lands and thus replace Petar. The mention of Petar and the Hungarians (who had recently settled in Pannonia) are the earliest known event of Serb–Hungarian relations. Simeon trusted Michael's accusation and decided for a military campaign, most likely closely following his decisive victory at Achelous (20 August 917).

In late 917 or 917/918 the Bulgarian emperor Simeon I sent an army led by Theodore Sigritsa and Marmais, accompanied by Pavle (the son of blinded Bran), that had Petar ousted and imprisoned in Bulgaria, where Petar died, and Pavle succeeded the Serbian throne. The Bulgars had tricked Petar, became godfathers with each other, and swore oath that nothing bad would come from the Bulgar side, but as soon as they met him they chained him and took him to Bulgaria. The legitimacy of Pavle was not challenged among the župani, which shows that primogeniture or secundogeniture was less important in the 10th century and that belonging to the Serbian dynasty sufficed. It is unknown whether Petar had any heir, as DAI makes no explicit mention of such (if Simeon was the godfather, perhaps Petar's son died in infancy).

== Aftermath ==
Pavle began his rule as a loyal subject of Simeon, which meant that the Bulgarian threat to Serbia was gone. Bulgaria was winning in the Byzantine–Bulgarian struggle following their victory at Achelous, and their precedence is also seen in their influence in Serbia and Pavle. In December 920, the admiral Romanos Lekapenos who had been part of the regency for the minor Constantine VII, rose to become the Byzantine emperor. Romanos understood that Byzantium needed Serbia to open a front in the west of Bulgaria to counter Simeon.

In the beginning of 921, Romanos Lekapenos sent Zaharija (the son of Prvoslav, the legitimate Serbian ruler) from Constantinople to take the Serbian throne. Pavle defeated Zaharija in battle, captured him, and handed him over to the Bulgars. Pavle however switched sides and became hostile to Bulgaria, and this was a result of Byzantine politics in the wider area of the Serb (Dalmatian) principalities, as well as internal discord and external pressure. That same year Zaharija was now sent by the Bulgars and he succeeded in ousting Pavle.

== Legacy ==
Vladan Đorđević (1844–1930) wrote the drama Petar Gojniković while studying at the Belgrade gymnasium. Stevan Sremac (1855–1906) authored the historic novel series Iz knjiga starostavnih, which includes the Vlastimirović dynasty (and Petar Gojniković) as characters. Vlastimir Stanisavljević wrote a fantasy which included the members of the Vlastimirović, including Petar. In 2020, the historic novel Veliki knez (Велики кнез) with Petar as the main character was authored by Biljana Gojković.

There are streets named after him in Borča (Belgrade) and Mramorski Potok (Niš).

== Family tree ==
Family tree

Vlastimir
Mutimir	Strojimir	Gojnik	daughter
Prvoslav	Bran	Stefan	Klonimir	Petar	Hvalimir
Zaharija	Pavle	Časlav	Čučimir

== See also ==
- List of Serbian monarchs

== Annotations ==
1. The name Petar (Петар) is biblical. It is rendered Πέτρος (transliterated as Petros) in DAI. He is also known in historiography with his patronymic, as Petar Gojniković (Петар Гојниковић).
2. T. Živković (2006) believed Strojimir and Gojnik were expelled in 855/856, and that Petar, who was described as a "child" (paidion), was born between 843 and 846 and was younger than his cousins Prvoslav, Bran and Stefan. P. Komatina dated the Bulgar–Serb war to the 860s.
3. In historiography, the account on them finding refuge in Croatia is deemed illogical as it was the location of departure of the usurper Petar Gojniković. T. Živković too, believed that it was a transcription error and should say Bulgaria instead of Croatia. P. Komatina deemed it unlikely that it was a transcription error.
4. In the Gesta Hungarorum, there is a story that the Hungarians subjugated the land of Raška (Serbia) at the time of Árpád (r. c.895–c.907), and for long held the Serbian ruler imprisoned in chains (Latin: ...et ducem eius captum diu ferro ligatum tenuerunt...); while this points to the Serbian ruler Petar (r. 892–917/918), the author's tendency to attribute Pannonian operations to Árpád's time and the fact that Petar had friendly relations with the Magyars, it is more likely that the ruler in question is Časlav, who is also similarly described in LPD (Latin: ...et captus est rex Ciaslavus et omnes parentes illius... ligatis manibus et pedibus...). This shows there was a tradition of a Magyar-Serbian conflict, which received literary expression following two centuries.

== Sources ==
- Đekić, Đorđe (2009). "Zašto je Knez Mutimir zadržao Petra Gojnikovića?" [Why did prince Mutimir keep Petar Gojniković?]. Teme (2). Универзитет у Нишу: 683–688. ISSN 0353-7919 – via CEEOL.
- Komatina, Ivana (2023). "Културна кретања у српско-угарским односима у XIII веку" [Cultural tendencies in the Serbian-Hungarian relations in the 13th century: The Legend of St. Ladislaus and The Life of St. Sava.]. Зборник радова Византолошког института. 60 (2). Византолошки институт, Београд: 979–996. ISSN 2406-0917.
- Komatina, Predrag (2021). Константин Порфирогенит и рана историја Јужних Словена [Constantine Porphyrogenitus and the Early History of South Slavs]. Византолошки институт, Београд. ISBN 978-86-83883-28-8.
- Komatina, Predrag (2015). "О српско-бугарској граници у IX и X веку". Зборник радова Византолошког института. 52: 31–42. ISSN 2406-0917.
- Pavlović, Bojana (2025). "The Balkans between Byzantium and Bulgaria". In Krsmanović, Bojana (ed.). Barbarians, Rhomaioi and those in between: integrating the Christians of the Central Balkans into the Byzantine Empire (late 10th–mid-13th Century). Vol. 1. Institute for Byzantine Studies. doi:10.46793/barb.rhom.i.007p. ISBN 978-86-83883-29-5.
- Uzelac, Aleksandar (2018). "Prince Michael of Zahumlje – a Serbian ally of tsar Symeon". In Nikolov, Angel; Kanev, Nikolay (eds.). Emperor Symeon's Bulgaria in the History of Europe's South-East: 1100 years from the Battle of Achelous. St Kliment Ohridski University Press, Sofia. pp. 236–245 – via Academia.edu.
- Živković, Tibor (2006). Портрети српских владара: IX-XII век [Portraits of Serbian Rulers: IX-XII century]. Завод за уџбенике и наставна средства, Београд. ISBN 9788617137548.
- Živković, Vojislav (2020). "Улога ослепљења у политичком животу средњовековне Србије" [The role of blinding in the political life of Medieval Serbia] (PDF). Пешчаник - часопис Нишког архива. 19.

Petar Vlastimirović dynasty Died: after 917
Regnal titles
Preceded by Pribislav	Prince of Serbia; 892–917	Succeeded by Pavle
