= Bran Mutimirović =

Serbian prince

- Knez of Serbia
- Predecessor: Mutimir
- Issue: Pavle Branović
- House: House of Vlastimirović
- Father: Mutimir
- Religion: Chalcedonian Christian

Bran Mutimirović (Latin: Branus) was a Serbian prince, son of Serbian ruler Mutimir.

He and Stefan escorted Khan Boris I of Bulgaria to the Serbian-Bulgarian border at Ras after the Serbs successfully fought off the Khan's army in an attempted revenge to the defeat of Presian years earlier by their grandfather Vlastimir. Bran and Stefan were given presents for the escort, and in turn gifted 2 slaves, 2 falcons, 2 dogs, and 80 furs as a symbol of friendship, the Bulgars were pleased with the tribute.

After the death of his father Mutimir, his elder brother Pribislav took the Serbian crown, but was deposed after a year by their cousin Petar Gojniković and fled with Bran and Stefan to Croatia. Three years after the accession of Petar, Bran rebelled against him but was captured and blinded.

He was married and had a son, Pavle Branović.

Titles in pretence
Preceded by Pribislav	Pretender to the Serbian throne (Župan); 892	Succeeded by Pribislav deposed by Petar I
