= Pribislav of Serbia =

Pribislav
- Prince / Archont / Knez of Serbs / Serbia

Prince of Serbia
- Reign: 891–892
- Predecessor: Mutimir
- Successor: Petar
- Born: 845/850
- Died: After 892
- Issue: Zaharija
- House: Vlastimirović dynasty
- Father: Mutimir
- Religion: Chalcedonian Christian

Pribislav (Serbian: Прибислав, Greek: Πριβέσθλαβος) was Prince of the Serbs for a year, in 891–892, before being deposed by his cousin Petar. He was the eldest son of Mutimir (r. 851–891) of the Vlastimirović dynasty, who ruled during the expanding and Christianization of Serbia.

== Life ==
His father had with his brothers Strojimir and Gojnik, defeated the Bulgar Army sent by Tsar Boris I of Bulgaria and led by his son Vladimir. Vladimir was captured together with 12 boyars. Boris I and Mutimir agreed on peace (and perhaps an alliance), and Mutimir sent his sons Bran and Stefan beyond the border to escort the prisoners, where they exchanged items as a sign of peace: Boris himself gave them "rich gifts", while he was given "two slaves, two falcons, two dogs, and eighty furs".

In the 880s, Mutimir seized the throne, exiling his younger brothers and Klonimir, Strojimir's son, to the court of Boris I in the Bulgar Khanate. This was most likely due to treachery. Petar, the son of Gojnik, was kept at the Serbian court of Mutimir for political reasons, but he soon fled to Branimir of Croatia.

Mutimir died in 890 or 891, leaving the throne to his eldest son, Pribislav. Pribislav had only ruled for a year when Petar returned in 892, defeating him in battle and seizing the throne. Pribislav fled to Croatia with his brothers Bran and Stefan. Bran later returned and led an unsuccessful rebellion against Petar in 894. Bran was defeated, captured and blinded (a Byzantine tradition meant to disqualify a person from taking the throne)

His only son, Zaharija, remained in Constantinople for a long period before successfully seizing the throne with Byzantine aid, ruling from 922–924.

Vlastimir
Mutimir
Pribislav	Bran	Stefan
Zaharija I

== Legacy ==
The Pribislav mentioned in the Gospel of Cividale (codex aquileiensis), is most likely referring to Pribislav.

== Notes ==
1. Name: The first attestation of his name is the Greek Pribeslavos (Πριβέσθλαβος), in Latin Pribesthlabus or Preuuisclao, in Serbian Pribislav or Prvoslav (Прибислав/Првослав, meaning "First-glorified"; from the words prvo - first, and slava - glory). He was a descendant of Vlastimirović, his father was Mutimir, hence, according to the contemporary naming culture, his name was Pribislav Mutimirović Vlastimirović.

== Sources ==
- Moravcsik, Gyula, ed. (1967) [1949]. Constantine Porphyrogenitus: De Administrando Imperio (2nd revised ed.). Washington D.C.: Dumbarton Oaks Center for Byzantine Studies. ISBN 9780884020219.
- Bury, John B. (1912). A History of the Eastern Empire from the Fall of Irene to the Accession of Basil I. (A.D. 802-867). London: Macmillan. ISBN 9781275594623.
- Ćirković, Sima (2004). The Serbs. Malden: Blackwell Publishing. ISBN 9781405142915.
- Ćorović, Vladimir, Istorija srpskog naroda, Book I, (In Serbian) Electric Book, Rastko Electronic Book, Antikvarneknjige (Cyrillic)
  - Drugi Period, IV: Pokrštavanje Južnih Slovena
- Curta, Florin (2006). Southeastern Europe in the Middle Ages, 500–1250. Cambridge: Cambridge University Press.
- Ferjančić, B. 1997, "Basile I et la restauration du pouvoir byzantin au IXème siècle", Zbornik radova Vizantološkog instituta, no. 36, pp. 9–30.
- Fine, John Van Antwerp Jr. (1991) [1983]. The Early Medieval Balkans: A Critical Survey from the Sixth to the Late Twelfth Century. Ann Arbor, Michigan: University of Michigan Press. ISBN 0472081497.
- Живковић, Тибор (2002). Јужни Словени под византијском влашћу 600-1025 (South Slavs under the Byzantine Rule 600-1025). Београд: Историјски институт САНУ, Службени гласник. ISBN 9788677430276.
- Tibor Živković, Portreti srpskih vladara (IX—XII), Beograd, 2006 (ISBN 86-17-13754-1), p. 11
- Živković, Tibor (2008). Forging unity: The South Slavs between East and West 550-1150. Belgrade: The Institute of History, Čigoja štampa. ISBN 9788675585732.
- Vizantološki institut SANU (Božidar Ferjančić), „Vizantijski izvori za istoriju naroda Jugoslavije (II tom)“ (fototipsko izdanje originala iz 1957), Beograd 2007 ISBN 978-86-83883-08-0
- Eggers, Martin (1996). Das Erzbistum des Method: Lage, Wirkung und Nachleben der kyrillomethodianischen Mission. Verlag Otto Sagner. ISBN 9783876906492.

Pribislav Vlastimirović dynasty
Regnal titles
Preceded by Mutimir	Prince of Serbia; 891–892	Succeeded by Petar
