= Mutimir of Serbia =

Prince of Serbia (ca. 830s–891)

Mutimir

Prince of Serbia
- Reign: c. 850 – 891
- Predecessor: Vlastimir
- Successor: Pribislav
- Born: ca. 830s
- Died: 891
- Issue: Pribislav; Stefan; Bran
- House: Vlastimirović
- Father: Vlastimir
- Religion: Chalcedonian Christianity (c. 870) prev. Slavic Paganism

Mutimir (Serbian: Мутимир, Greek: Μουντιμῆρος) was prince of the first Serbian Principality from ca. 850 until 891. He defeated the Bulgar army, and allied himself with the Byzantine emperor, and the Church in Serbia with the Ecumenical Patriarchate of Constantinople.

He was the eldest son of Knez Vlastimir, great-great-grandson of the unnamed 7th-century Serbian ruler, who managed to unite the Serb tribes into a state. He initially ruled together with his two younger brothers, but they revolted against him and he exiled them to Bulgaria, as guarantors of peace.

== Background ==
It is thought that the rapid extension of Bulgars over Slavs to the south prompted the Serbs to unite into a state. It is known that the Serbs and Bulgars lived in peace until the invasion in 839 (the last years of Theophilos). Vlastimir united several Serbian tribes, Emperor Theophilos (r. 829–842) probably granted the Serbs independence, and they acknowledged nominal overlordship of the Emperor. The annexation of western Macedonia by the Bulgars changed the political situation, Malamir or Presian may have seen a threat in the Serb consolidation, and opted to include them in their conquest of Slav lands.

Khan Presian I of Bulgaria (r. 836–852) invades Serbian territory between 839 and 842. The Bulgars may have been threatened by the Serbs, or, perhaps, the Byzantines wanted to divert Bulgarian attention so that they could cope with the Slavic uprising in the Peloponnese. The invasion led to a 3-year war, from which Vlastimir emerged victorious; the heavily defeated Khan Presian made no territorial gains, lost many of his men, and was driven out by Vlastimir's army.

The war ended with the death of Theophilos in 842, which released Vlastimir from his obligations to the Byzantine Empire, but also gave the Bulgarians the opportunity to annex the areas of Ohrid, Bitola and Devol in 842–843.

Vlastimir continued expanding to the west, taking southeast Bosnia and northeast Herzegovina (Hum). In the meantime, Braničevo, Morava, Timok, Vardar and Podrimlje were occupied by the Bulgars.

== Life ==
Vlastimir died sometime between 845 and 850 and his rule was divided among his three sons: Mutimir, Strojimir and Gojnik. Although they ruled in an oligarchy, Mutimir had the supreme rule, and the two brothers acted as vassals to him.

In 853 or 854, the Bulgar Army, led by Vladimir, the son of Boris I of Bulgaria, invaded Serbia in an attempt to exact vengeance for the previous defeat. The Serbian Army was led by Mutimir and his brothers, which defeated the Bulgars, capturing Vladimir and 12 boyars. Boris I and Mutimir agreed to cease hostilities (and perhaps an alliance, and Mutimir sent his sons Bran and Stefan to the border to escort the prisoners, where they exchanged items as a sign of peace. Boris gave them "rich gifts", while he was given "two slaves, two falcons, two dogs, and 80 furs".

An internal conflict among the brothers resulted in Mutimir banishing the two younger brothers to the Bulgarian court. He, however, kept the son of Gojnik, Petar, in his court for political reasons. Petar soon fled to Croatia. The reason for the feud is not known, although it is hypothesized that it was the result of treachery.

The Saracens attacked Ragusa in 866. The Ragusians asked Basil I for help, which he answered, sending a large fleet with his admiral Niketas Ooryphas. The pagan Narentines sacked a ship with emissaries returning from Constantinople, which enraged Basil I, resulting in him sending a fleet and subsequently subduing them. By 878, all of Dalmatia was under Byzantine rule (Theme of Dalmatia), and most of the land was under the religious jurisdiction of the Ecumenical Patriarchate of Constantinople.

Mutimir died in 891 and was succeeded by his eldest son, Pribislav. Mutimir and his son Pribislav (as "Preuuisclavo") were apparently entered in the Cividale Gospels, which could indicate Serbian contacts with Aquileia. Serbia's transition to Christianity would, therefore, coincide with similar initiatives by Rome in Moravia and Bosnia-Slavonia (as, incidentally, also in Bulgaria) and suggest a coordinated action in south-eastern Europe originating in Rome.

=== Christianization ===
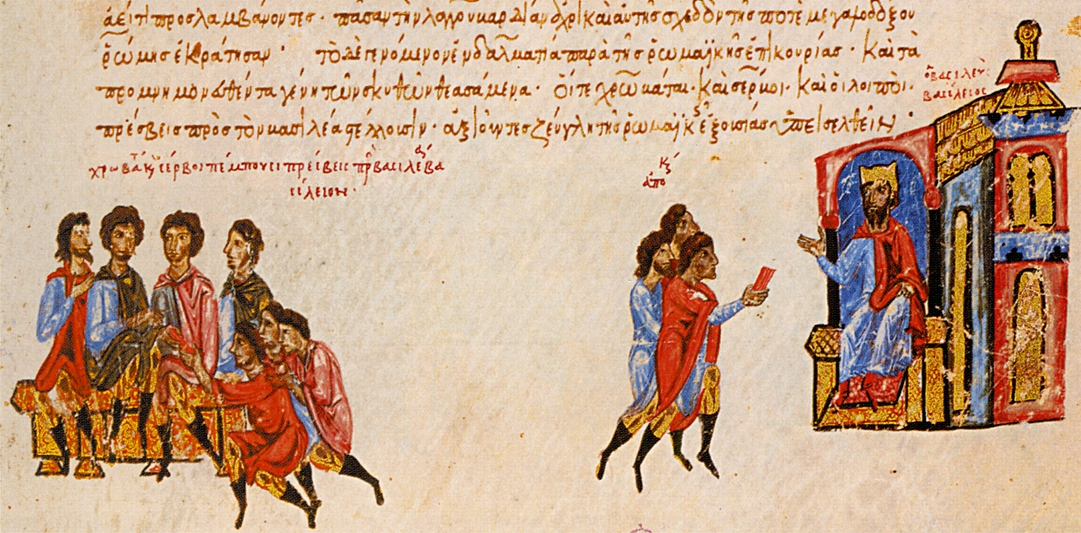
The Serbs and Croats delegation to Byzantine Emperor Basil I

Early medieval Serbs are accounted as Christian by 870s, with the Christianization of Southwestern Slavs beginning in the 7th century under influence of the Roman Church.

According to 29th chapter of De Administrando Imperio and 54th chapter of Vita Basilii by Constantine VII, the Serbs and other Slavs became (re-)baptized by Constantinopolitan missionaries sent by Basil I. The account is probably an invented narrative by Constantine VII to give credit to Basil I for Christianization which started in the 7th century amid ecclesiastical turmoil between Constantinople and Rome in the region, or a misinterpretation based on the account in his father's Tactica about Basil I baptizing and graecizing the Slavs in Greece. In the DAI chapters specifically about the Serbs and others, Basil I is not mentioned in any political or religious context of the Serbs and others. The Christianization was only partly due to Byzantine and subsequent Bulgarian influence, because Basil I's activity had in plan expansion on the already present Christian organization of the Roman Church in the region of former Praetorian prefecture of Illyricum (including Bulgaria) and getting control over the Serbs and others. In the same century the region was also politically contested between Carolingian Empire and Byzantine Empire. Basil I probably sent at least one embassy to Mutimir.

"The priests there loose and wandering, coming from all sides, occupy some church services against canons, certainly commit many wicked acts against God's rules, for being acephali. That is why I warn you that you, following the customs of your ancestors, as much as you can try to get back to the Pannonian Diocese. And since there has just been ordained a bishop, thanks to God, by the See of the Blessed Apostle Peter, place yourself back under his pastoral care"

— Pope John VIII letter to Mutimir, May 873.

Mutimir seemingly decided to maintain the communion of Church in Serbia with the Eastern Orthodox Patriarchate of Constantinople when Pope John VIII of Roman Church invited him to get back to the jurisdiction of the bishopric of Sirmium (see also Archbishopric of Moravia) in a letter dated to May 873. Komatina considered that the pope wanted to strengthen the influence of Roman Church on the eastern part of Illyricum considering the borders from a distant past and not recent including Mutimir's actual ancestors. The Serbs and Bulgarians subsequently adopted the Old Slavonic liturgy instead of the Greek. During the rule of Kotsel of Pannonia (861–874), communications between Serbia and Great Moravia must have been possible. There is a possibility that some Cyrillomethodian pupils reached Serbia in the 870s or 880s. The lasting Christian identity is evident in the tradition of theophoric names in the next generation of Serb royalty: Petar Gojniković, Stefan Mutimirović and Pavle Branović. Petros and Stephanos are both characteristically Byzantine.

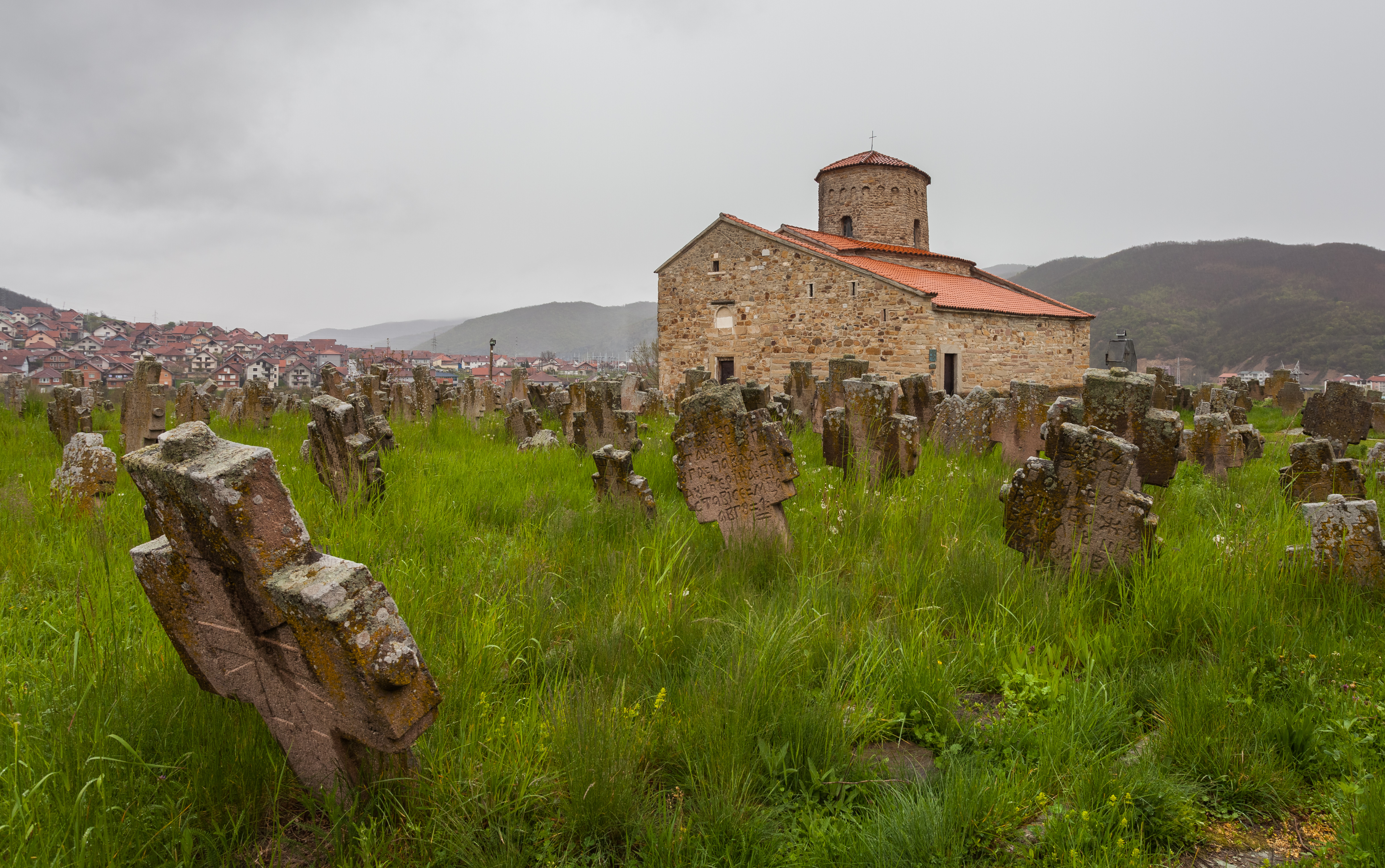
Church of Saint Apostles Peter and Paul in Ras dated to the 9-10th century.

Alexis P. Vlasto argued that the Eparchy of Ras was founded during Mutimir's rule, as a bishopric of Serbia, at Ras with the church of Saint Apostles Peter and Paul, as part of the general plan of establishing bishoprics in the Slav lands of the Empire, confirmed by the Council of Constantinople in 879–880, most significantly related to the creation of the autonomous Archbishopric for Bulgaria of which Roman Church lost jurisdiction. However, according to Predrag Komatina, there is no mention of any bishopric in Serbia. In early medieval Europe, the existence of a Christian church without a bishop in a specific land was not uncommon, and being placed under the Pannonian Bishop implies that there was no local Serbian bishop at the time. Tibor Živković concluded, based on primary sources of the Church of Constantinople, that there was no information regarding the establishment of any new ecclesiastical center and organization in Serbia, that the Serbian ecclesiastical center and capital was at Destinikon, while Ras in the mid-9th century was only a border fort which became the ecclesiastical center of the bishopric by 1019-1020. The imperial charter of Basil II from 1020 to the Archbishopric of Ohrid, in which the rights and jurisdictions were established, has the earliest mention of the Bishopric/Episcopy of Ras, stating it belonged to the Bulgarian autocephal church during the time of Peter I (927–969) and Samuel of Bulgaria (977–1014). Sima Ćirković considered that it was founded by the Bulgarian emperor, but it most likely represented the latest date in which it could have been integrated into the Bulgarian Church. The episcopy probably was part of the Bulgarian metropolis of Morava, but certainly not of Durrës. If it was on the Serbian territory, it seems that the Church in Serbia or part of the territory of Serbia became linked and influenced by the Bulgarian Church between 870 and 924.

== Legacy ==
In the 1985 film "Boris I" (Борис Първи), about the life of Boris I of Bulgaria, the peace treaty between Mutimir and Boris I is featured.

== Notes ==
1. Name: The first attestation of his name is the Greek Muntimiros (Μουντιμῆρος), in Latin Montemero in Serbian Mutimir. He was a descendant of Višeslavić, his father was Vlastimir, hence, according to the contemporary naming culture, his name was Mutimir Vlastimirović Višeslavić.

== Sources ==
- Moravcsik, Gyula, ed. (1967) [1949]. Constantine Porphyrogenitus: De Administrando Imperio (2nd revised ed.). Washington D.C.: Dumbarton Oaks Center for Byzantine Studies. ISBN 9780884020219.
- Bury, John B. (1912). A History of the Eastern Empire from the Fall of Irene to the Accession of Basil I. (A.D. 802-867). London: Macmillan. ISBN 9781275594623.
- Ćirković, Sima (2004). The Serbs. Malden: Blackwell Publishing. ISBN 9781405142915.
- Fine, John Van Antwerp Jr. (1991) [1983]. The Early Medieval Balkans: A Critical Survey from the Sixth to the Late Twelfth Century. Ann Arbor, Michigan: University of Michigan Press. ISBN 0-472-08149-7.
- Ćorović, Vladimir, Istorija srpskog naroda, Book I, (In Serbian) Electric Book, Rastko Electronic Book, Antikvarneknjige (Cyrillic)
  - Drugi Period, IV: Pokrštavanje Južnih Slovena
- Curta, Florin (2006). Southeastern Europe in the Middle Ages, 500–1250. Cambridge: Cambridge University Press.
- Ferjančić, B. 1997, "Basile I et la restauration du pouvoir byzantin au IXème siècle", Zbornik radova Vizantološkog instituta, no. 36, pp. 9–30.
- Vizantološki institut SANU (Božidar Ferjančić), „Vizantijski izvori za istoriju naroda Jugoslavije (II tom)“ (fototipsko izdanje originala iz 1957), Beograd 2007 ISBN 978-86-83883-08-0
- Komatina, Ivana (2016). Црква и држава у српским земљама од XI до XIII века [Church and State in the Serbian Lands from the XIth to the XIIIth Century]. Београд: Institute of History. ISBN 9788677431136.
- Komatina, Predrag (2015). "The Church in Serbia at the Time of Cyrilo-Methodian Mission in Moravia". Cyril and Methodius: Byzantium and the World of the Slavs. Thessaloniki: Dimos. pp. 711–718.
- Ostrogorsky, George (1956). History of the Byzantine State. Oxford: Basil Blackwell.
- Runciman, Steven (1930). A History of the First Bulgarian Empire. London: G. Bell & Sons. ISBN 9780598749222.
- Špehar, Perica N. (2010). "By Their Fruit you will recognize them - Christianization of Serbia in Middle Ages". Tak więc po owocach poznacie ich. Poznań: Stowarzyszenie naukowe archeologów Polskich. pp. 203–220.
- Vlasto, Alexis P. (1970). The Entry of the Slavs into Christendom: An Introduction to the Medieval History of the Slavs. Cambridge: Cambridge University Press. ISBN 9780521074599.
- Живковић, Тибор (2000). Словени и Ромеји: Славизација на простору Србије од VII до XI века (The Slavs and the Romans). Београд: Историјски институт САНУ, Службени гласник. ISBN 9788677430221.
- Живковић, Тибор (2002). Јужни Словени под византијском влашћу 600-1025 (South Slavs under the Byzantine Rule 600-1025). Београд: Историјски институт САНУ, Службени гласник. ISBN 9788677430276.
- Живковић, Тибор (2004). Црквена организација у српским земљама: Рани средњи век (Organization of the Church in Serbian Lands: Early Middle Ages). Београд: Историјски институт САНУ, Службени гласник. ISBN 9788677430443.
- Живковић, Тибор (2006). Портрети српских владара: IX-XII век (Portraits of Serbian Rulers: IX-XII Century). Београд: Завод за уџбенике и наставна средства. ISBN 9788617137548.
- Živković, Tibor (2008). Forging unity: The South Slavs between East and West 550-1150. Belgrade: The Institute of History, Čigoja štampa. ISBN 9788675585732.
- Živković, Tibor (2013a). "On the Baptism of the Serbs and Croats in the Time of Basil I (867–886)" (PDF). Studia Slavica et Balcanica Petropolitana (1): 33–53.
- Živković, Tibor (2013b). "The Urban Landcape [sic] of Early Medieval Slavic Principalities in the Territories of the Former Praefectura Illyricum and in the Province of Dalmatia (ca. 610-950)". The World of the Slavs: Studies of the East, West and South Slavs: Civitas, Oppidas, Villas and Archeological Evidence (7th to 11th Centuries AD). Belgrade: The Institute for History. pp. 15–36. ISBN 9788677431044.
- Eggers, Martin (1996). Das Erzbistum des Method: Lage, Wirkung und Nachleben der kyrillomethodianischen Mission. Verlag Otto Sagner. ISBN 9783876906492.

Mutimir Vlastimirović dynasty
Regnal titles
Preceded by Vlastimir	Prince of Serbia c. 850 – 891	Succeeded by Pribislav
