= Vlastimir =

- archon (ἄρχων)
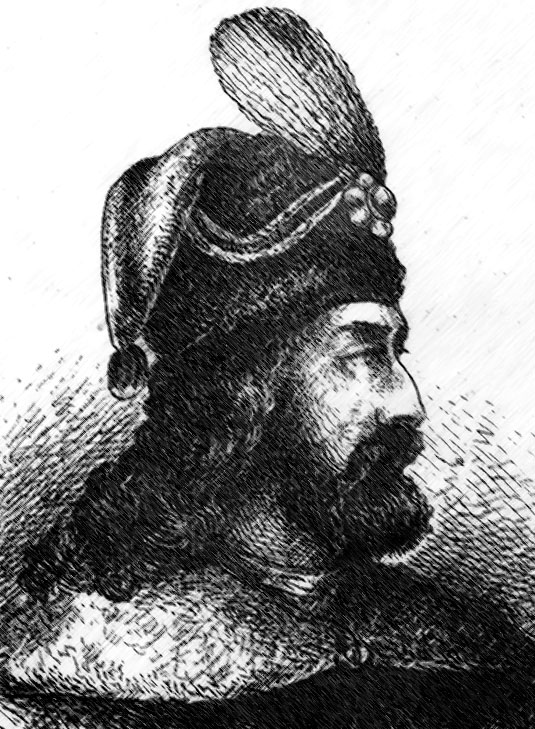
- Romanticized depiction by Kosta Mandrović (1885)

Prince of Serbia
- Reign: c. 830 – 850
- Predecessor: Prosigoj
- Successor: Mutimir
- Born: before 805
- Died: c. 851
- Issue: Mutimir, Strojimir, and Gojnik
- Dynasty: Vlastimirović
- Father: Prosigoj
- Religion: Slavic pagan

Vlastimir (Serbian Cyrillic: Властимир, Greek: Βλαστίμηρος; c. 805 – 851) was the prince of Serbia from c. 830 until c. 851. Little is known of his reign. He held Serbia during the growing threat posed by the neighbouring, hitherto peaceful, First Bulgarian Empire, which had expanded significantly toward Serbia.

At the time, the Bulgarian Empire and the Byzantine Empire were at peace by treaty, and although the Byzantine Emperor was overlord of the Serb lands, he was unable to aid the Serbs in a potential war. Presian I of Bulgaria eventually invaded Serbia, resulting in a three-year-war, in which the Bulgarian army was devastated and driven out. Vlastimir then turned to the west, expanding well into the hinterland of Dalmatia. He is the eponymous founder of the Vlastimirović dynasty, the first Serbian dynasty.

== Background ==
=== Serbian realm and family history ===
The unnamed 7th-century Serbian ruler (prince, archon) who led the Serbs to the Balkans and received the protection of Heraclius (r. 610–641) was an ancestor of Vlastimir. The Serbs at that time were organized into župe, a confederation of village communities (roughly the equivalent of a county), headed by a local župan (a magistrate or governor). According to Fine, the governorship was hereditary, and the župan reported to the Serbian prince, whom they were obliged to aid in war. Emperor Constantine VII Porphyrogenitus (r. 913–959) mentions that the Serbian throne is inherited by the son, i.e., the first-born, though on one occasion there is a triumvirate in his enumeration of monarchs. The DAI's account about the Serbian ethnic settlement and establishment of several future principalities by the 10th century is considered as highly disputable: Serbia (roughly the later province of Rascia, including Bosnia; part of Zagorje - "hinterlands"); and Pagania, Zachlumia, Travunia (including Kanalitai) and Dioclea (part of Pomorje - "maritime").

Višeslav, the great-grandfather of Vlastimir and first Serbian monarch known by name, was a contemporary with Charlemagne (fl. 768–814). He directly held the hereditary lands of Tara, Piva and Lim. Constantine VI conquered the Sclaviniae (slavdom - "slav area") of Macedonia, situated to the south, in 785. Radoslav, then Prosigoj, succeeded Višeslav, and they ruled during the revolt of Ljudevit Posavski against the Franks (819–822). According to the Royal Frankish Annals, written in 822, Ljudevit went from his seat at Sisak to the Serbs, who controlled a great part of Dalmatia.

=== Rise of Bulgarian power ===
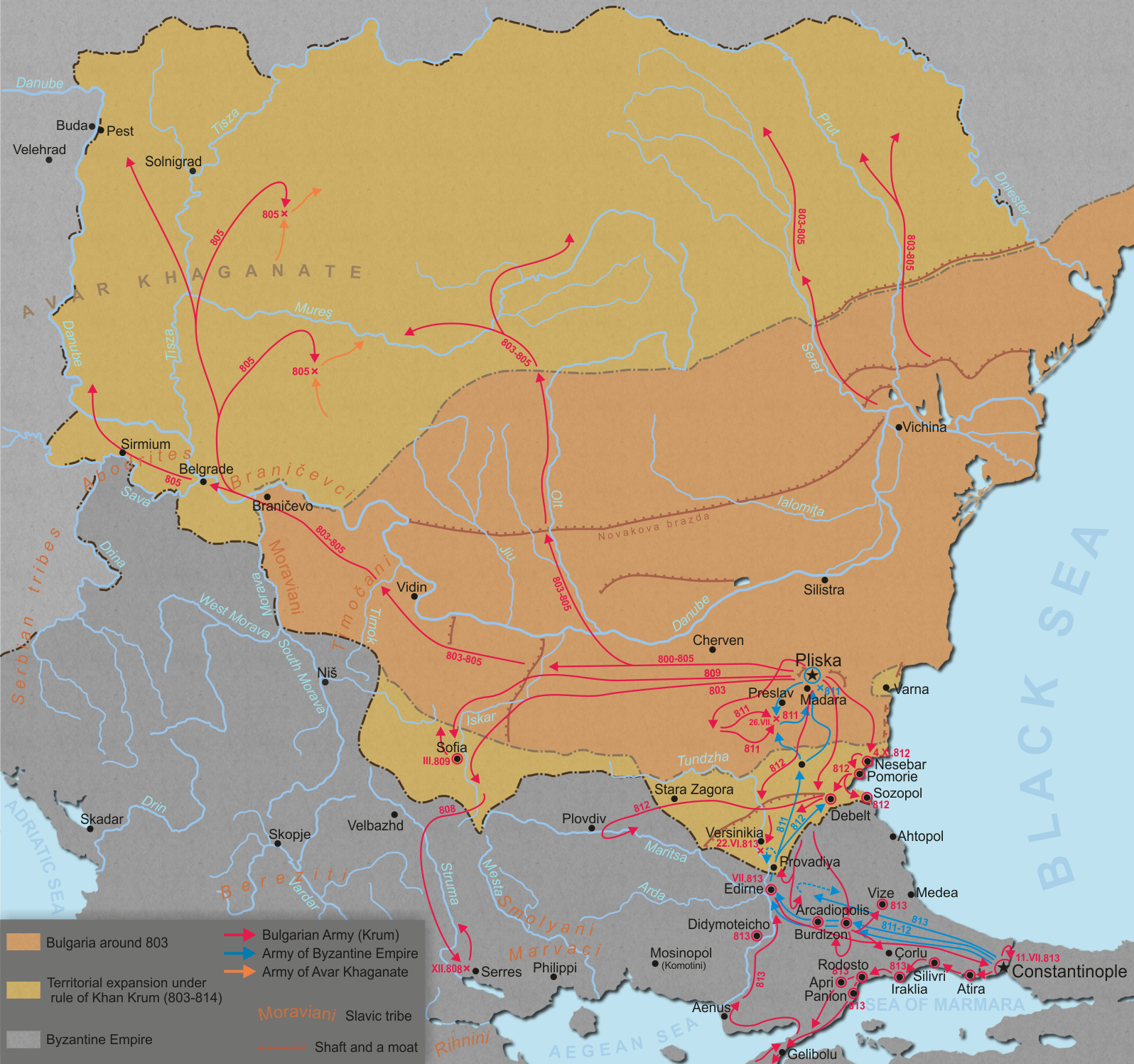
Bulgarian expansion by 814.

In the east, the Bulgarian Empire grew strong. In 805, khan Krum conquered the Braničevci, Timočani and Obotrites, to the east of Serbia, banished their tribal chiefs, and replaced them with administrators appointed by the central government. In 815, the Bulgarians and Byzantines signed a 30-year peace treaty. In 818 during the rule of Omurtag (814–831), the Braničevci and Timočani together with other tribes of the frontiers, revolted and seceded from Bulgaria because of an administrative reform that had deprived them much of their local authority. The Timočani left the societas (association, alliance) of the Bulgarian Empire, and sought, together with the Danubian Obotrites and Guduscani, protection from Holy Roman Emperor Louis the Pious (r. 813–840), and met him at his court at Herstal. The Timočani migrated into Frankish territory, somewhere in Lower Pannonia, and were last mentioned in 819, when they were persuaded by Ljudevit to join him in fighting the Franks. The Danubian Obotrites stayed in Banat, and resisted the Bulgarians until 824, when nothing more is heard of them. The khan sent envoys to the Franks and requested that the precise boundary be demarcated between them, and negotiations lasted until 826, when the Franks neglected him. The Bulgarians answered by attacking the Slavs that lived in Pannonia, and subjugated them, then sent ships up the Drava river, and, in 828, devastated Upper Pannonia, north of the Drava. There was more fighting in 829 as well, and by this time, the Bulgarians had conquered all of their former Slavic allies.

The Bulgarian state had a general policy of expansion in which they would first impose the payment of tribute on a neighboring people and the obligation of supplying military assistance in the form of an alliance (societas), leaving them internal self-government and local rulers, and when the need for this kind of relationship expired, they would terminate the self-government arrangement and impose direct and absolute power, integrating their neighbor fully into the Bulgarian political and cultural system.

== Life and reign ==
Vlastimir succeeded his father, Prosigoj, as the archon of Serbia. According to Živković, the date of Vlastimir's accession was around 830. He united the Serbian tribes in the vicinity. The Serbs most likely consolidated due to alarm at the advance of Bulgaria towards their borders—a rapid conquest of neighbouring Slavs—in self-defence, and possibly sought to cut off the Bulgarian expansion to the south (Macedonia). Emperor Theophilos (r. 829–842) was recognized as the nominal suzerain (overlord) of the Serbs, and most likely encouraged them to thwart the Bulgarians. The thirty-year-peace treaty between the Byzantines and Bulgarians, signed in 815, was still in effect.

=== War with the Bulgarian Empire ===
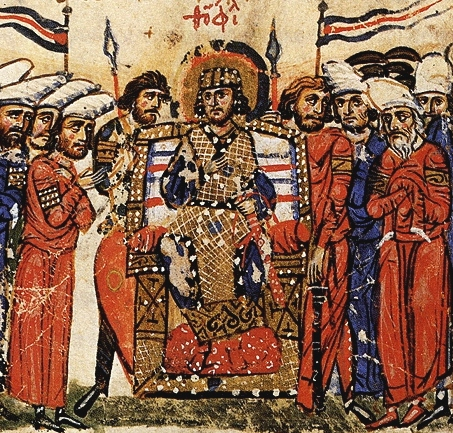
Emperor Theophilos, who was the overlord of the Serbs, was prohibited to aid Vlastimir in a potential war with the Bulgarians as a peace treaty was in effect. Some historians maintain that he had an important part in the Bulgar-Serb war.

According to Constantine VII, the Serbs and Bulgaria had lived peacefully as neighbours until the invasion in 839 (in the last years of Theophilos). It is not known what exactly prompted the war, as Porphyrogenitus gives no clear answer; whether it was a result of Serbian-Bulgarian relations, i.e., the Bulgar conquest to the southeast, or a result of the Byzantine-Bulgarian rivalry, in which Serbia was an Imperial ally. It was not unlikely that the Emperor had a part in it; as he was at war with the Arabs, he may have pushed the Serbs to drive the Bulgaria from western Macedonia, which would benefit them both. According to J. Bury, this alliance would explain Malamir's action. Zlatarski supposes that the Emperor offered the Serbs complete independence in return.

According to Porphyrogenitus, the Bulgarians wanted to continue their conquest to the west and force the Serbs into subjugation. Presian I (r. 836–852) launched an invasion into Serbian territory in 839, which led to a war that lasted for three years, in which the Serbs were victorious; the defeated Presian lost a large number of his men, made no territorial gains, and was driven out by Vlastimir's army. The Serbs held out in their easily defensible forests and gorges, and knew how to fight in the hills. The war ended with the death of Theophilos in 842, which released Vlastimir from his obligations to the Empire.

According to Živković, it is possible that the Bulgarian attack came after the failed invasion of Struma and Nestos in 846 (see next section): Presian may have collected his army and headed for Serbia, and Vlastimir may have participated in the Byzantine–Bulgarian Wars, which would mean that Presian responded to a direct Serbian involvement.

The defeat of the Bulgarians, who had become one of the greater powers in the 9th century, shows that Serbia was an organized entity, fully capable of defending its borders, and possessing military and administrative organization. It is not known whether Serbia at the time of Vlastimir had a fortification system or developed military structures in which the župan had clearly defined roles.

=== Expansion ===
Slavic principalities in ca. 814 AD.

After the victory Vlastimir's status rose. He went on to expand to the west, taking Bosnia, and Herzegovina (Hum). Vlastimir married off his daughter to Krajina, the son of a local župan of Trebinje, Beloje, in ca. 847/848. With this marriage, Vlastimir elevated Krajina's title to archon. The Belojević family was entitled to the rule of Travunia. Krajina had a son with Vlastimir's daughter, named Hvalimir, who would later on succeed as župan of Travunia.

Vlastimir's intent to connect to the ruling house of Travunia shows, in context, that his reputation among the neighbouring Serbian archontes and župani was on the rise, as well as the political importance and military strength of Serbia. It is possible that, prior to Vlastimir's reign, the Travunian župan sought to free himself from Serbia's influence, but that Vlastimir found the solution in the political marriage of his daughter to Krajina. The elevation of Krajina's title (which meant the practical independence of Travunia) strongly suggests that Vlastimir was a Christian ruler who understood very well the monarchal ideology that developed in the early Middle Ages. There is a possibility that the marriage took place before the conflict with Bulgaria, which makes another theory likely: that Bulgaria reacted to Vlastimir's rising political position, particularly given that he had the right to confirm rulers in the neighbouring Serbian principalities with Byzantine sanction. Although Vlastimir's elevations of titles were merely symbolic, rather than a reflection of administrative-political relations, it does show that he had the right to act this way, which undoubtedly puts him at the head of all Serbian archontes—viz., the leading ruler among the Serbian principalities.

Soon after 846, with the end of the thirty-year-truce, Malamir (or Presian) invaded the regions of the Struma and the Nestos, and Empress-Regent Theodora (r. 842–855, the wife of Theophilos) answered by attacking Northern Thrace. A brief peace was concluded, then Malamir proceeded to invade Macedonia. Bulgaria also imposed rule on the Morava region, a frontier region with the Serbians; in 844, an anonymous Bavarian geographer mentions the Merehani as the people that bordered the Franks furthest away. They lived in the valleys of the present-day Morava river basin, and were still unconquered by the Bulgarians. However, after 845, Bulgaria added these Slavs to their societas; they are last mentioned in 853.

The Byzantines were also active in the hinterland of Dalmatia, to the west of Serbia; the strategos of the cities of Dalmatia came into conflict with a Frankish vassal, Duke Trpimir I of Croatia, in 846/848, who defeated the strategos.

Vlastimir was succeeded by his three sons about 851.

== Family ==
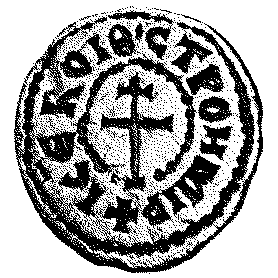
Seal of prince Strojimir of Serbia, from the late 9th century

Vlastimir had three sons and one daughter:

- Mutimir, Prince, 851–891
- Strojimir, Prince (co-ruler), 851–880s
- Gojnik, Prince (co-ruler), 851–880s
- Unnamed daughter, married Krajina Belojević

== Aftermath ==
Vlastimir's three sons successfully fought off an onslaught by Boris I of Bulgaria in 853 or 854 (shortly after the death of Vlastimir), when they captured 12 great boyars and the commander himself, Vladimir, the son of Boris. The Bulgarians had sought to avenge the previous defeat of Presian in 842. The two sides made peace, and possibly an alliance. The two younger brothers later revolted against Mutimir for undisclosed reasons. Mutimir sent them as prisoners, a guarantee of peace, to the court of Boris I at Pliska. After Mutimir requested that Emperor Basil I (867–886) baptize his lands, Constantinopolitan priests were sent and a Serbian bishopric was founded. The Christianization is evident in the tradition of theophoric names found in the next generation of Serbian monarchs (e.g., Petar Gojniković, Pavle Branović). The three branches of Vlastimir's sons continued a succession war over the decades.

The Bulgars under Boris I were persuaded by Moravian Prince Rastislav to attack Louis the German of East Francia. The Bulgar-Slav campaign ended in disaster, and a peace was signed in 855. The following year, the Byzantine army, led by Michael III and caesar Bardas, recaptured Philippopolis (Plovdiv), the region of Zagora and the ports around the Gulf of Burgas on the Black Sea. In 863, the Byzantines invaded the Khanate once again, during a period of famine and natural disasters. Boris I was forced to sign a peace and to convert to Christianity, in return for which he was gifted Zagora. The cradle of the Bulgarian Orthodox Church was founded about 870 in Pliska.

On July 11, 2006, A golden seal of Strojimir, dated to 855–896, was acquired by the Republic of Serbia at auction in Munich, Germany, for €20,000, beating a Bulgarian bid of €15,000 . The seller was an unknown Russian. The seal is of Byzantine handcraft (from Athens, Thessaloniki or Constantinople), weighs 15.64 g, and has a patriarchal cross and a Greek inscription that reads: "Strojimir" and "God, Help Serbia".

A street in Novi Sad is named after Vlastimir (Ulica Kneza Vlastimira).

== See also ==
- List of Serbian monarchs
- Serbia in the Middle Ages
- De Administrando Imperio

== Annotations ==
1. Name: The first attestation of his name is the Greek Vlastimiros (Βλαστίμηρος). In Latin, his name is spelled Blastemirus, in Serbian Vlastimir, although some identify his name as a misprint of the name Vladimir. His grandfather, and most distant ancestor known by name, was Višeslav, his father was Prosigoj, hence, according to naming culture, his name was Vlastimir Prosigojev(ić) Višeslavić. The root of his name, vlastiti, means "to rule".
2. Reign: According to Živković, he began his rule in ca. 830, and as his sons succeeded him during the rule of Presian, he ended his rule in 851, at latest. Živković puts the year of his death at 851, a year before the death of Presian, with whom he failed to reach peace. According to Runciman, his reign ended between 845-850.
3. Title: Constantine VII refers to the monarchal title as archon (ἄρχων), of Serbia (Σερβία /Σερβλίας) in De Administrando Imperio, and mentions "archon of the Serbs" (ἄρχων Σερβλίας) in his protocol of De Ceremoniis, and the title is used interchangeably, as if to denote a ruler of a nation. Archon was usually used when describing a Prince. Vlastimir's title in Serbian is knez, which is used for early monarchs, though later referring to dukes. In some secondary sources, his title has been given as Grand Župan (or Grand Prince), signifying leadership over other, lesser, župans. In minor cases he has been called King.
4. Religion: Although Porphyrogenitus says that Heraclius sent "priests of Rome" (during the Byzantine Papacy) to baptize the Serbs, he later says Basil I sent Constantinopolitan priests, and possibly a bishop, on the request of Mutimir, after the war with the Saracens in 869. At this time, the Eparchy of Ras and Braničevo were founded, alongside other Slavic bishoprics, confirmed by the Eighth Ecumenical Council (879-880). The Slavic names of Vlastimir and his sons does not necessarily mean that Serbia was pagan, though the tradition of theophoric names in the next generation point to this. Most historians account Serbia as Christian as of 870. According to Živković, he was most likely Christian.

== Sources ==
Primary sources

- Dvornik, F.; Jenkins, R. J. H.; Lewis, B.; Moravcsik, Gy.; Obolensky, D.; Runciman, S. (1962). P. J. H. Jenkins (ed.). De Administrando Imperio: Volume II. Commentary. University of London: The Athlone Press.
- Moravcsik, Gyula, ed. (1967) [1949]. Constantine Porphyrogenitus: De Administrando Imperio (2nd revised ed.). Washington D.C.: Dumbarton Oaks Center for Byzantine Studies. ISBN 9780884020219.
- Pertz, Georg Heinrich, ed. (1845). Einhardi Annales. Hanover.
- Scholz, Bernhard Walter, ed. (1970). Carolingian Chronicles: Royal Frankish Annals and Nithard's Histories. University of Michigan Press. ISBN 0472061860.

Secondary sources

- Bulgarian Academy of Sciences (1966). Études historiques. Vol. 3. Éditions de l'Académie bulgare des sciences.
- Bury, John B. (1912). A History of the Eastern Empire from the Fall of Irene to the Accession of Basil I. (A.D. 802-867). London: MacMillan. ISBN 9781275594623. Runc
- Carter, Francis W. (1977). An historical geography of the Balkans.
- Ćorović, Vladimir (2001). Istorija srpskog naroda (Internet ed.). Belgrade: Ars Libri.
- Ćirković, Sima (2004). The Serbs. Malden: Blackwell Publishing. ISBN 9781405142915.
- Cuddon, John Anthony (1986). The companion guide to Jugoslavia. Collins. ISBN 0-00-217045-0.
- Evans, Arthur (2007). Through Bosnia and the Herzegovina on Foot During the Insurrection, August and September 1875. Cosimo, Inc. ISBN 978-1-60206-270-2.
- Curta, Florin (2006). Southeastern Europe in the Middle Ages, 500–1250. Cambridge: Cambridge University Press.
- Ferjančić, Božidar (1997). "Basile I et la restauration du pouvoir byzantin au IXème siècle" [Vasilije I i obnova vizantijske vlasti u IX veku]. Zbornik radova Vizantološkog instituta (in French) (36). Belgrade: 9–30.
- Ferjančić, Božidar (2007). Vizantijski izvori za istoriju naroda Jugoslavije II (fototipsko izdanje originala iz 1959 ed.). Belgrade. pp. 46–65. ISBN 978-86-83883-08-0.
- Forbes, Nevill (2004). The Balkans: A History of Bulgaria, Serbia, Greece, Rumania, Turkey. Digital Antiquaria. ISBN 978-1-58057-314-6.
- Fine, John Van Antwerp Jr. (1991) [1983]. The Early Medieval Balkans: A Critical Survey from the Sixth to the Late Twelfth Century. Ann Arbor, Michigan: University of Michigan Press. ISBN 0472081497.
- Houtsma, M. Th. (1993). E.J. Brill's first encyclopaedia of Islam 1913–1936. BRILL. ISBN 90-04-08265-4.
- Komatina, Predrag (2010). "The Slavs of the mid-Danube basin and the Bulgarian expansion in the first half of the 9th century" (PDF). Зборник радова Византолошког института. 47: 55–82.
- Komatina, Predrag (2015). "The Church in Serbia at the Time of Cyrilo-Methodian Mission in Moravia". Cyril and Methodius: Byzantium and the World of the Slavs. Thessaloniki: Dimos. pp. 711–718.
- Mijatovic, Cedomilj (2007) [1908]. Servia and the Servians. Cosimo, Inc. ISBN 978-1-60520-005-7.
- Runciman, Steven (1930). A History of the First Bulgarian Empire. London: G. Bell & Sons. ISBN 9780598749222.
- Slijepčević, Đoko M. (1958). The Macedonian question:the struggle for southern Serbia. American Institute for Balkan Affairs.
- Stephenson, Paul (2000). Byzantium's Balkan Frontier: A Political Study of the Northern Balkans, 900-1204. Cambridge: Cambridge University Press. ISBN 0-521-77017-3.
- Vlasto, Alexis P. (1970). The Entry of the Slavs into Christendom: An Introduction to the Medieval History of the Slavs. Cambridge: Cambridge University Press. ISBN 9780521074599.
- Živković, Tibor (2006). Portreti srpskih vladara (IX—XII vek). Belgrade. pp. 11–20. ISBN 86-17-13754-1.
- Živković, Tibor (2007). "The Golden Seal of Stroimir" (PDF). Historical Review. 55. Belgrade: The Institute for History: 23–29.
- Živković, Tibor (2008). Forging unity: The South Slavs between East and West 550-1150. Belgrade: The Institute of History, Čigoja štampa. ISBN 9788675585732.
- Živković, Tibor (2013). "The Urban Landcape [sic] of Early Medieval Slavic Principalities in the Territories of the Former Praefectura Illyricum and in the Province of Dalmatia (ca. 610-950)". The World of the Slavs: Studies of the East, West and South Slavs: Civitas, Oppidas, Villas and Archeological Evidence (7th to 11th Centuries AD). Belgrade: The Institute for History. pp. 15–36. ISBN 9788677431044.
- Zlatarski, Vasil (1918). История на Първото българско Царство. I. Епоха на хуно-българското надмощие (679—852) (in Bulgarian) (Internet ed.). Sofia.
- Коматина, Предраг (2014). "Идентитет Дукљана према De administrando imperio". Зборник радова Византолошког института. 51: 33–46.

Vlastimir (of the Vlastimirović dynasty) Born: ca. 805 Died: ca. 851
Regnal titles
Preceded by Prosigoj	Prince of Serbia ca. 830 – 851	Succeeded by Mutimir
