= Stefan Mutimirović =

Stefan
- Born: Stari Ras
- Parent(s): Mutimir (House of Vlastimirović)

Stefan Mutimirović (Serbian: Стефан Мутимировић, Greek: Στέφανος) was a 9th-century Serbian royal member of the ruling dynasty, the Vlastimirović.

He was the younger son of Mutimir of the ruling Serbian dynasty, the Vlastimirovići. His father had with his brothers Strojimir and Gojnik, defeated the Bulgar Army sent by Tsar Boris, led by his son Vladimir. They were captured with 12 boyars, but were soon freed in exchange for good relations between the peoples. Peace was agreed upon and Stefan and his older brother, Pribislav, escorted the prisoners towards the border at Ras. There, Boris gave them rich gifts and received 2 slaves, 2 falcons, two dogs, and 80 furs from Mutimir.

== Sources ==
- Moravcsik, Gyula, ed. (1967) [1949]. Constantine Porphyrogenitus: De Administrando Imperio (2nd revised ed.). Washington D.C.: Dumbarton Oaks Center for Byzantine Studies. ISBN 9780884020219.
- Ćirković, Sima (2004). The Serbs. Malden: Blackwell Publishing. ISBN 9781405142915.
- Fine, John Van Antwerp Jr. (1991) [1983]. The Early Medieval Balkans: A Critical Survey from the Sixth to the Late Twelfth Century. Ann Arbor, Michigan: University of Michigan Press. ISBN 0472081497.
- Ferjančić, B. 1997, "Basile I et la restauration du pouvoir byzantin au IXème siècle", Zbornik Radova Vizantološkog Instituta, no. 36, pp. 9–30.
- Vlasto, Alexis P. (1970). The Entry of the Slavs into Christendom: An Introduction to the Medieval History of the Slavs. Cambridge: Cambridge University Press. ISBN 9780521074599.
