= List of Serbian monarchs =

Monarchs of Serbia (Note: Viceroy, Duke, Prince, Grand Prince, Lord, Despot, King, Tsar of Serbia)
- Српски монарси (Note: Бана, Кнеза, Жупана, Велика Жупана, Бана, Господина, Деспота, Краља, Цара Срба); Srpski monarsi (Note: Bana, Kneza, Župana, Velika Župana, Gospodina, Despota, Kralja, Cara Srba)
- Standard of the King of Serbia (1882-1918) Royal Coat of arms

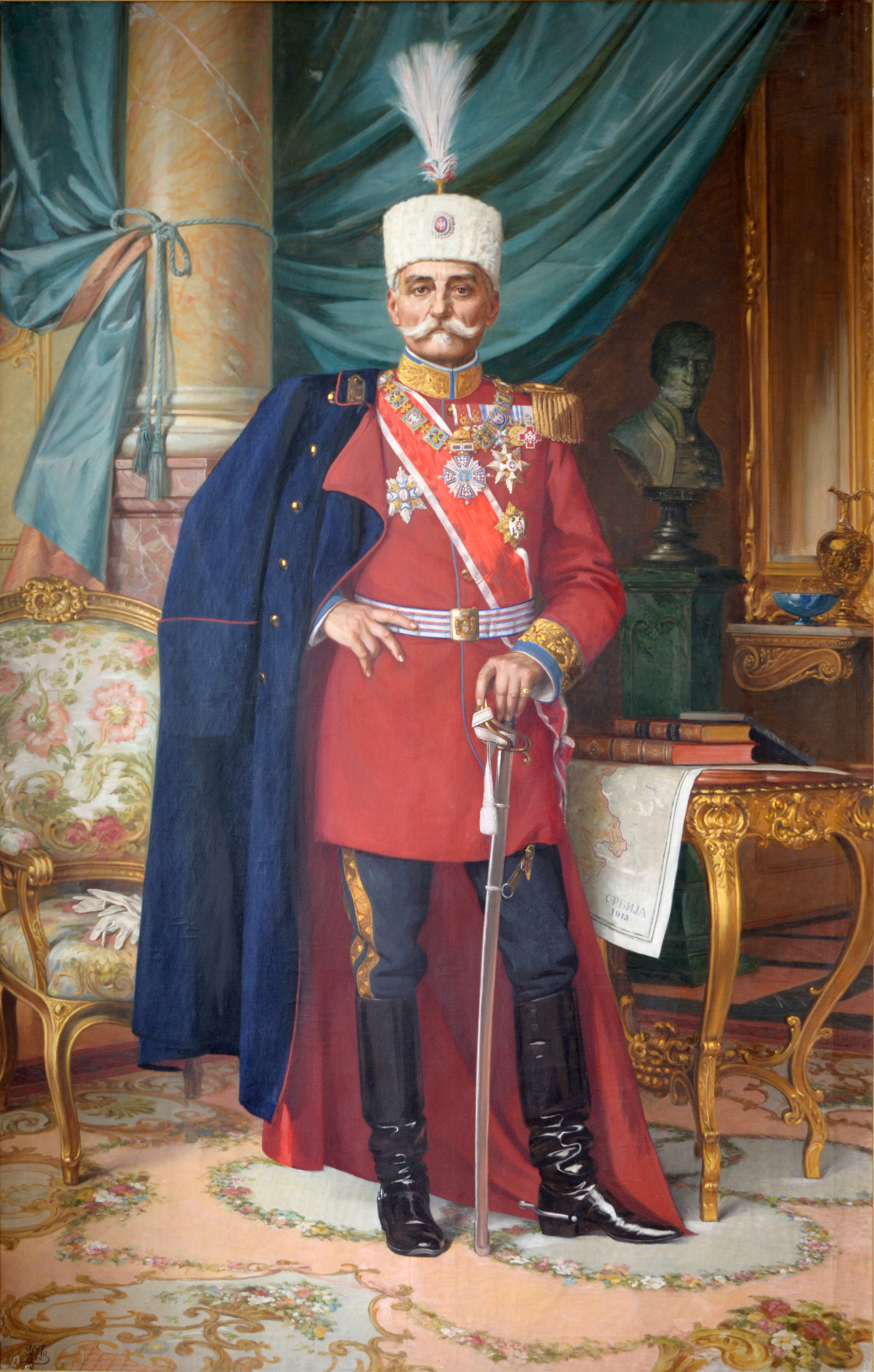
- Last monarch King of Serbia; Petar I Karađorđević; 11 July [O.S. 29 June] 1844 – 16 August 1921

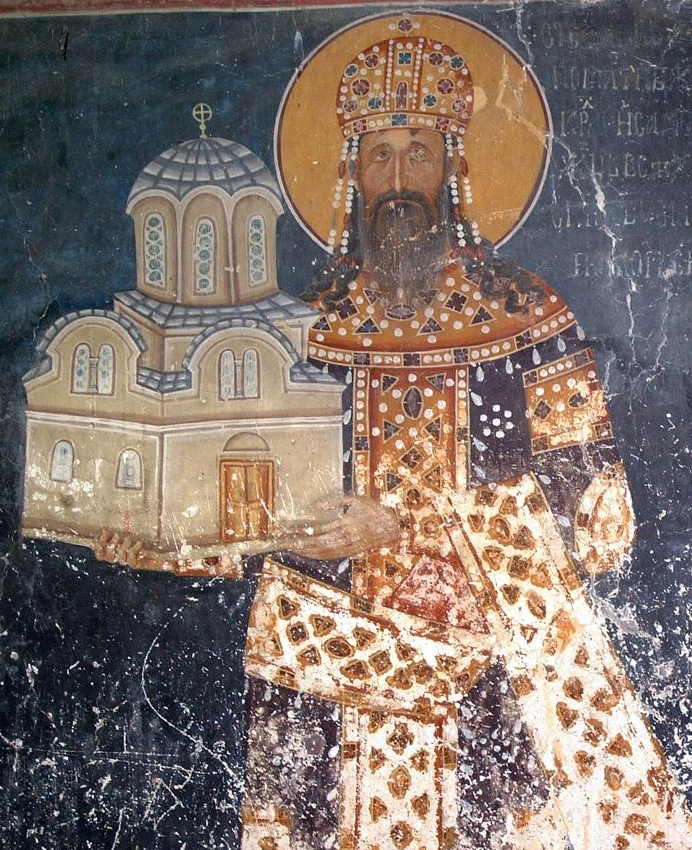
- Longest reign King of Serbia; Stefan Uroš II Milutin Nemanjić; 1282 – 1321

Details
- Style: His Majesty
- First monarch: Serbian archon (as Prince); Višeslav (as first Prince known by name)
- Last monarch: Peter I (as King of Serbia) Peter II (as King of Yugoslavia)
- Formed: 626; 1400 years ago
- Abolished: 1 December 1918; 108 years ago (unification of Serbs, Croats, and Slovenes into a kingdom) 29 November 1945 (proclamation of the socialist one-party dictatorship)
- Residences: Stari Dvor, Belgrade, Serbia
- Appointer: Hereditary
- Pretender: Crown Prince Alexander

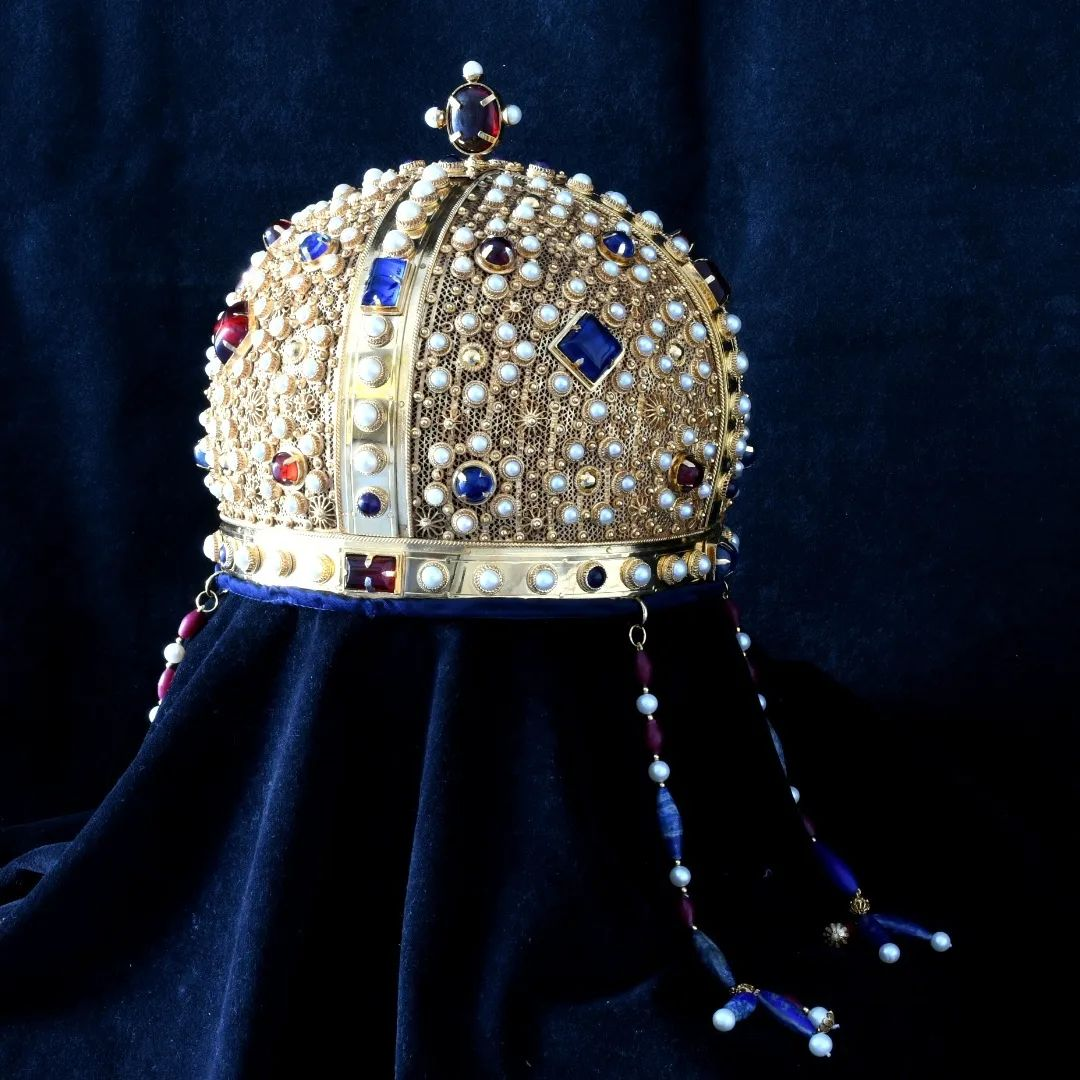
Holy Crown of Serbia

This is an archontological list of Serbian monarchs, containing monarchs of the medieval principalities, to heads of state of modern Serbia. The Serbian monarchy dates back to the Early Middle Ages.

The Serbian royal titles used include Knyaz (Prince), Grand Župan (Grand Prince), King, Tsar (Emperor), and Despot.

== Early medieval Serbian states (7th century–1166) ==
=== Vlastimirović dynasty (7th century–960) ===
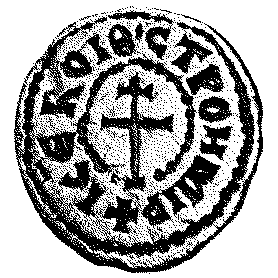
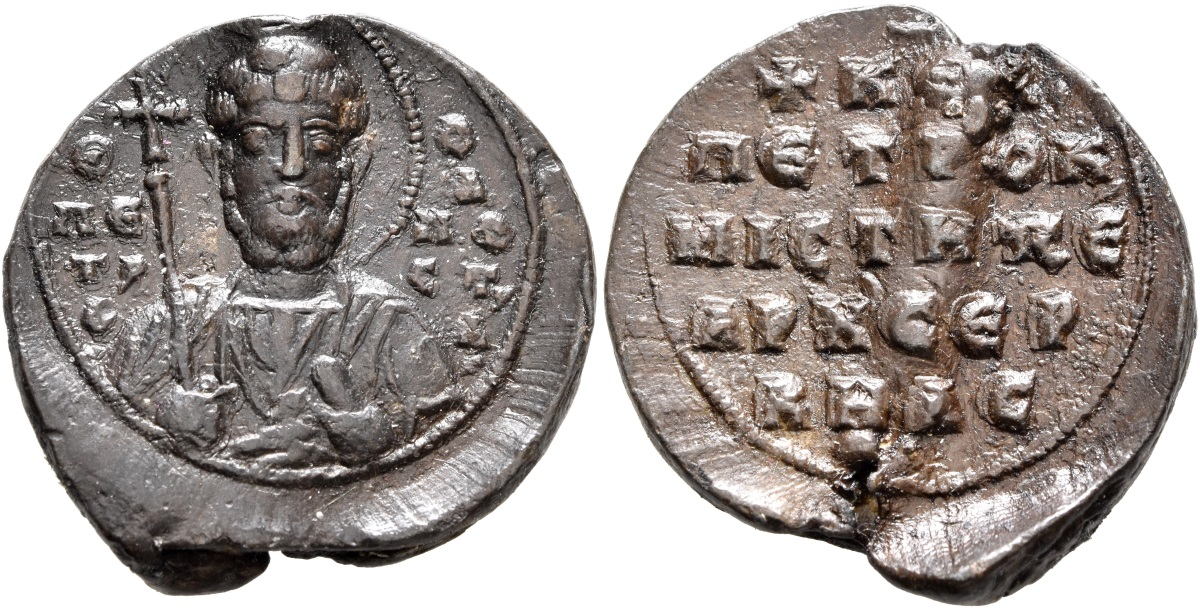
Vlastimirović

The Vlastimirović dynasty was the first royal dynasty of the Serb people. Byzantine emperor Constantine VII Porphyrogenitus (r. 913–959) mentions that the Serbian throne is inherited by the son, i.e. the first-born, though in his enumeration of Serbian monarchs, on one occasion there was a triumvirate. The Serbs established several polities by the 10th century: Serbia or Zagorje (hinterlands) which consisted of Serbia and small land of Bosnia; and Pomorje (maritime) which consisted of Dioclea, Zachlumia, Pagania, Travunia (including Kanalitai). The Serbian ruler was titled knyaz or archon by the Byzantines, "prince".

The history of the dynasty starts with the eponymous founder Vlastimir. This era is marked by the Christianization of Serbs, the many internal and external wars (Bulgars, Magyars), and the power struggle between the First Bulgarian Empire and the Byzantine Empire in which Serbia found itself in the middle. The history of this dynasty ends with the annexation of Serbia in 969.

Ruler	Reign	Notes
Unknown Archon	fl. 626–650	One of the two sons of an unnamed "king" of White Serbia (assumed to be Dervan), he led "half of his folk" to the Balkans and was given land by Byzantine emperor Heraclius (r. 610–641), upon receiving his protection (most likely before 626). He is said to have died long before the Bulgar invasion (681).
For two or three generations, no information was recorded or preserved.
Višeslav	c. 780	A descendant of the Unknown Archon, he lived during the rule of Frankish King Charlemagne, and ruled the hereditary lands, župe ("counties, districts") around Tara, Piva, and Lim. He united some Slavic tribes, forming the first Serbian principality.
Radoslav	<830	Son of Višeslav, he or his son Prosigoj are believed to have ruled during the time in which the Royal Frankish Annals speak of Ljudevit Posavski revolting against the Franks (ca. 819–822), during which time is said that the Serbs held a great part of Dalmatia. At this time, there was peace with the Bulgaria.
Prosigoj	<830	Son of Višeslav, he or his son Prosigoj are believed to have ruled during the time in which the Royal Frankish Annals speak of Ljudevit Posavski revolting against the Franks (ca. 819–822), during which time is said that the Serbs held a great part of Dalmatia. At this time, there was peace with the Bulgaria.
Vlastimir	c. 830–850	Son of Prosigoj. He is the eponymous founder of the Vlastimirović dynasty. He defeated the Bulgars in a three-year war against Khan Presian. Vlastimir had three sons (Mutimir, Strojimir and Gojnik) and one daughter. His daughter married Krajina, who received the fief of Travunia.
Mutimir	850–891	Eldest son of Vlastimir. Mutimir was the supreme ruler, with his two younger brothers (Gojnik and Strojimir) being subordinate to him. They successfully fought off an attack by Bulgarian Prince Vladimir-Rasate sent by Vladimir's father knyaz Boris I of Bulgaria (r. 852–889) during the Bulgar-Serb war of 853. Gojnik and Strojimir later revolted against Mutimir, who exiled them to Boris in Bulgaria in 855–856, securing brief peace between the two nations. Byzantine emperor Basil I the Macedonian sent missionaries to Serbia by 869. The Eparchy of Ras was established by 871, as the bishopric of Serbs.
Pribislav	891–892	He was the eldest son of Mutimir. Pribislav ruled briefly until 892 when Petar Gojniković, his cousin, returned and defeated him in battle. Pribislav fled with his two brothers (Bran and Stefan) and son, Zaharije, to Croatia.
Petar	892–917	Son of Gojnik, born in ca. 870. His name (Peter) symbolizes Christianization of the Serbs. He returned from exile and deposed Pribislav in 892. He later caught Bran in 895 under an attempted coup and blinded him, and then in 897 he killed Klonimir, the son of Strojimir, in yet another attempted coup. Petar re-gained Bosnia and annexed Pagania. He was in conflict with Mihailo Višević, the ruler of Zahumlje (917–935), who would warn Simeon I of Bulgaria of a possible alliance between Serbia and the Byzantines. Petar defeated Pavle, the son of Bran, who was sent by Simeon I of Bulgaria. In 917, Simeon's generals tricked and captured Peter, sending him to prison in First Bulgarian Empire, where he died within a year.
Pavle	917–921	Son of Bran Mutimirović, born in ca. 870–874. He was sent with an army to Serbia in 917, but was defeated by Petar. After Petar was deposed, Pavle took the throne. He defeats Zaharija, the son of Pribislav, sent by the Byzantines in 920. He was initially vassal to Simeon I of Bulgaria, later he switched to the Byzantine Empire. Zaharija, now sent by the Bulgarians, defeats him in 921.
Zaharija	921–925/926	Son of Pribislav. Zaharije was sent in 920 by the Byzantines to retake the throne, but was captured by Pavle and handed over to Simeon I of Bulgaria who held him hostage for future tactics. In the meantime, Pavle switched sides to the Byzantines; Simeon dispatched Zaharija who managed to defeat Pavle and then betrayed Simeon by supporting the Byzantines. Zaharija defeated the Bulgarian army in 923, when he sent two heads and weapons of Bulgarian generals as trophies to Constantinople. In 924, a much larger army was sent by the Bulgarians, led by Časlav Klonimirović, Zaharija's second cousin. Časlav won the battle and Zaharija fled to Croatia. Simeon gathered all Serbian counts, and instead of instating Časlav, he arrested them and sent them as captives to Bulgaria, annexing Serbia.
Serbia was annexed by the First Bulgarian Empire (925/926–927/928)
Časlav	927/928 – before 945	Born to Klonimir. Defeated Zaharija in 924, after which he was attacked by Simeon I of Bulgaria who annexed the Serbian tribes. He returned and liberated and united the tribes from Bulgaria. According to the semi-mythical account from the Chronicle of the Priest of Duklja, certain Ciaslavus defeated the Magyars, but was later captured and drowned by them. His son-in-law Tihomir, who had held the Drina county, succeeded him as ruler of Serbia (the relation with Ciaslavus and those events remains disputable). The state is believed to have disintegrated, and becoming annexed by the Byzantines and Bulgaria.
Serbia was annexed by the Byzantines (Catepanate of Ras fl. 969–976), and ruled by strategoi. The Serbian principality was succeeded by the principality of Duklja.

=== Vojislavljević dynasty (1018–1186/9) ===
With the partial annexation of Serbia, the county around the city of Doclea emerges into a Principality, where the leaders adopt the title archon of Serbs, signifying supreme leadership among Serbs, alongside their given offices under Byzantine overlordship. The first office-holder was Peter of Diokleia, of which we only have a seal found in the 19th century. The next known is Jovan Vladimir, who became a Bulgarian vassal. Stefan Vojislav succeeds in giving the realm independence, he is the eponymous founder of the Vojislavljevići that ruled Duklja from the early 11th century up to the 1180s.

Picture	^{Title}Name	Reign	Notes
	^{Archon} Peter	10th century	Peter was an archon of Duklja in the 10th or 11th century. The only information on him is from a seal found in the 19th century, which is decorated on the obverse with a bust of the Virgin Mary holding a medallion of Christ and flanked by two cruciform invocative monograms. The text is in Greek letters, saying "Petrou, Archontos Diokleias, Amin" (ΠΕΤΡ(Ο)Υ ΑΡΧΟΝΤΟΣ ΔΙΟΚΛ(Ε)ΙΑ(Σ) ΑΜΗΝ) - Peter, archon of Dioklea, Amen. The seal shows that although Duklja underwent turmoil in the 9th century, the region still continued under Byzantine rule, or if not authority, influence.
	^{Prince} Jovan Vladimir	c.1000–1016	Jovan fought to protect Duklja from Bulgarian expansion, making an alliance with Byzantium; Bulgaria however conquered Doclea in 997 and took Jovan Vladimir prisoner. Jovan ruled Duklja as a vassal of the Bulgarian empire until his murder in 1016.
	^{Ruler} Dragimir of Travunia and Zachlumia	c.1000–1018	Ruler of Travunia and Zachlumia, medieval Serbian principalities located in present-day regions of Herzegovina and south Dalmatia.
	^{Prince} Stefan Vojislav	1018–1043	Overthrew the Byzantine supremacy over Serbs in Duklja; founder of the Vojislavljević dynasty; in 1035 rebelled against the Byzantine Empire, but forced to sign an armistice; went to war again in 1040, which would be continued by his heir and son, Mihailo. Except Doclea, his realm included Travunia with Konavle and Zachumlia.
	^{Princess} Neda	1043–1046	As queen, she co-ruled with her sons, the princes.
	^{King ↑Prince} Mihailo Vojislavljević	1046–1081	Initially as a Byzantine vassal holding the title of protospatharios, then after 1077 as nominally serving Pope Gregory VII, addressed as "King of the Slavs". He had alienated himself from the Byzantines when he supported a Byzantine Slavic revolt in 1071–72, after which he then sought to gain support in the West. In 1077 he received a royal insignia by Gregory VII in the aftermath of the Church schism of 1054. note: Serbia is liberated from Byzantine rule and restored into the Serbian realm of Doclea, with Duklja being the seat.
	^{King (titular)} Constantine Bodin	1081–1101	Son of Michael. He was crowned 'Tsar of Bulgaria' as Peter III in 1072, after being chosen by Bulgarian nobles through his Cometopuli lineage, he was sent off with an army that would conquer parts of southern Serbia and Macedonia. He was captured and sent to Constantinople, where he spent several years. He was rescued in 1078 by Venetian sailors, and in 1081 he succeeds his father as King. He enlarged his influence, installing his nephews and other family in Bosnia and Serbia. He is captured by the Byzantines in the 1090s, and continues as a mere Byzantine vassal. note: Doclea is continued with a number of Byzantine and Serbian vassals (until 1146) - see List of rulers of Duklja.
	^{King (titular)} Dobroslav II	1101–1102	Overthrown by Vukan and Kočapar.
	Kočapar	1102–1103	Brought to power by Vukan of Serbia. Killed in battle against Zachlumia.
	Vladimir II	1103–1113	Married daughter of Vukan of Serbia. He was poisoned by his cousin Đorđe I.
	Đorđe I	1113–1118	Son of Constantine Bodin. Đorđe was overthrown by Uroš I in 1118.
	Grubeša	1118–1125	Overthrew Đorđe with the help of the Byzantines.
	Đorđe I	1125–1131	Second rule.
	^{Prince} Gradinja	1131–1146	Appointed to Doclean throne by Byzantines after Đorđe's defeat in the second war against Byzantines.
	^{Prince} Radoslav	1146–1148	Byzantine vassal. Only dynastic member to be mentioned as Prince of Doclea.
	^{Prince} Mihailo III	1180–1186	Byzantine vassal.
	^{Princess (disputed)} Desislava	1186–1189	According to Professor Božidar Šekularac, she was the last ruler of Duklja.

=== Vukanović dynasty (1091–1166) ===
In the mid-11th century, Mihailo I had liberated Serbia from Byzantine rule, and appointed his son Petrislav to rule as Prince, independently. In 1083, Constantine Bodin appoints brothers Vukan and Marko, sons of Petrislav, as rulers of Serbia. In 1089, the Byzantines capture Bodin, and Vukan retains independence, founding the Vukanović dynasty. The Vukanovići quickly claim the following Serbian domains in the following decades, and by 1148, the maritime possessions are united with the inland. The Byzantine Empire at times intervened in the political scene, and at times Serbia had Hungary as its main ally. The dynasty ruled until 1166, when a dynastic branch is instated by the Byzantines.

Ruler	Reign	Notes
^{Grand Prince} Vukan	1091–1112	Vukan was the son of Petrislav, the Prince of Serbia and son of Mihailo I, that held the office from ca 1060. In 1083, Constantine Bodin appoints Vukan to the supreme rule of Serbia, while Vukan's brother Marko administrated a part of the land, most likely the frontier region in the north. After the Byzantine campaign against Duklja in 1089, and the subsequent civil war, Vukan asserted independence, ruling as Grand Prince, becoming the most powerful Serb ruler as of ca 1091. He began raiding Byzantine territories in 1090, taking Kosovo, and defeated a Byzantine army in 1092. Vukan made peace with Alexios I Komnenos, after the Emperor had threatened with a larger army. However, Vukan immediately broke the treaty as the Byzantines marched onto the dangerous Cumans in Adrianople. Vukan conquers the cities along the Vardar. In 1095, the Emperor meets Vukan and renews the treaty. Vukan again raided Macedonia, as the First Crusade began. In 1106 he nominally recognized Alexios I. Note: Serbia is elevated to an independent Grand Principality.
^{Grand Prince} Uroš I	1112–1145	Uroš I was the son of either Vukan or Marko. In the treaty concluded between Vukan and Alexios I in 1095, Uroš I and Vukan became "guarantors of peace", as hostages to the Byzantines. Uroš succeeds the throne when Vukan dies. In ca 1130, he married his daughter, Jelena, to King Béla II of Hungary. Béla II, being blind, relied entirely on Jelena who acted as a co-ruler. In 1137, Ladislaus II, the son of Béla II and Jelena (the grandson of Uroš), becomes the Ban of Bosnia.
^{Grand Prince} Uroš II	1145–1162	Eldest son of Uroš I. note: Duklja and Travunia is re-incorporated into the realm.
^{Grand Prince} Beloš	1162	Instated by Manuel I Komnenos.
^{Grand Prince} Desa	c. 1155; 1162–1166	Desa took Zeta (Duklja) and Travunia from Radoslav of Duklja and unified the coastal Serbian Principalities under his firm grip.
^{Grand Prince} Tihomir	1166	First son of Zavida.

After Desa's revolt, in 1165 the Byzantium divided the Serb lands between the four sons of Zavida: Tihomir in Raška, Stracimir in Duklja, Miroslav in Zahumlje and Travunia, and Stefan Nemanja in Toplica (in today's central Serbia). Stefan Nemanja rebelled against his eldest brother Tihomir in 1166, who fled with his brothers Stracimir and Miroslav to Byzantium to seek help. But later on, Stefan Nemanja defeated his Greek army of mercenaries in the same year near the town of Pantino on Kosovo in which poor Tihomir drowned in the River of Sitnica. Nemanja captured his other brothers and made peace with them by giving them rule in their former parts of the land to recognise him as the only ruler of Rashka or Serbia. The Nemanjić dynasty was named after Stefan Nemanja and ruled over Serbia until 1371.

== Medieval Serbian state (1166–1371) ==
=== Nemanjić dynasty (1166–1373) ===
Nemanjić

The Nemanjić dynasty ruled the Serb lands between ca. 1166 up to 1371.

Picture	^{Title}Name	Reign	Notes
	^{Grand Prince} Stefan Nemanja; Saint Symeon the Myrrh-streaming	1166–1196	Nemanja is the eponymous founder of the Nemanjić dynasty. He re-established control over the neighbouring territories, including Duklja, Hum and Travunia. In his last years, he joined his son Sava and took monastic vows, later recognized as Saint Symeon after numerous alleged miracles following his death. Note: Duklja, Zahumlje and Travunija is reconquered, Nemanja is proclaimed "Grand Prince of All Serbia"
	^{Grand Prince} Vukan Nemanjić	1202–1204	Eldest son of Stefan Nemanja. He held the appanage of "Duklja, Dalmatia (Zahumlje), Travunija, Toplica and Hvosno" as Grand Prince, by 1190. He was the initial heir presumptive, but his father chose Stefan instead upon the abdication in 1196. With the death of Nemanja, Vukan started plotting against his brother. He found help in Hungary, and together they forced Stefan to flee to Bulgaria. He ruled as a Hungarian vassal, evident in Emeric I's title "King of Serbia". He left the throne in 1204, and continued to rule his appanage, he was later pardoned by the third brother Saint Sava.
	^{King ↑Grand Prince} Stefan Prvovenčani; Stefan the First-Crowned	1196–1202; 1204–1228	Second son of Stefan Nemanja. He inherited the title of Grand Prince in 1196 when his father retired as a monk. His reign began with a struggle against his brother Vukan, who expelled Stefan to Bulgaria. Kaloyan gave him an army of Cumans in exchange for eastern territories. The crisis ended when Sava negotiated a peace between the brothers and Stefan's power was cemented. He was crowned King in 1217, and then Sava gains autocephaly, becoming the first Archbishop of Serbs in 1219, thus Serbia retained full independence.
	^{King} Stefan Radoslav Stephanos Doukas; Jovan	1228–1233	Son of Stefan the First-crowned. He ruled Zahumlje during the reign of his father, and also held a governor status of Zeta. He was the co-founder of the Žiča monastery with his father, who would abdicate in 1227 due to illness, taking monastic vows. Radoslav was crowned by his uncle Sava, the Archbishop of Serbia. His marriage to Anna Angelina Komnene Doukaina would prove unpopular as she undermined his authority, he lost the loyalty of the people and in 1233 a revolt against them prompted the couple to flee to Dubrovnik.
	^{King} Stefan Vladislav	1234–1243	Son of Stefan the First-crowned. He succeeded his brother Radoslav in 1234 and ruled for 10 years, before being overthrown by his younger brother Uroš. He continued to rule Zeta. The first known flag design of Serbia was found in his treasury.
	^{King} Stefan Uroš I Uroš the Great; Symeon	1243–1276	Son of Stefan the First-crowned. He succeeded his brother Vladislav. He boosted trade with Dubrovnik and Kotor, marking a beginning of economic prosperity. In 1253 a war was fought against Dubrovnik, peace was signed in 1254, and in the 1260s a second war begun that ended in 1268. Uroš immediately turned towards Hungary, successfully taking Mačva, he was however captured and peace was ensured between the two Kings through marriage of Dragutin and Catherine, the daughter of Stephen V of Hungary. His oldest son Dragutin would have succeeded his rule, but Uroš favored Stefan Milutin, the younger son, as successor. He was overthrown by Stefan Dragutin in 1276.
	^{King} Stefan Dragutin; Teoctist	1276–1282; 1282–1316	Son of Stefan Uroš I. He overthrew his father with help from the Hungarian royalty (through his marriage to Catherine of Hungary) after the Battle of Gacko. He was injured in 1282, and gave the supreme rule to his younger brother Milutin, but continued to rule what would later become the Kingdom of Srem with the capital at Belgrade. Milutin boosted relations with the Byzantine Emperor, and refused to give the rule to Vladislav II (Dragutin's son), causing a split of the Kingdom. Dragutin continued to rule the northern frontier in Hungarian alliance, but in the last years re-connected with Serbia, acting as a vassal.
	^{King} Stefan Uroš II Milutin	1282–1321	Son of Stefan Uroš I. He succeeded his brother Dragutin. Upon his accession, he immediately turned towards Macedonia, conquering the northern part with Skoplje, which became his capital. He continued deep into Byzantine lands, taking northern Albania and as far as Kavala. He also took Vidin, and later Durrës. He was in a succession war with Dragutin after peace was signed with the Byzantines in 1299. Milutin aids the Byzantines against the Turks at the Battle of Gallipoli, which ended in a victory. When Dragutin died he put most of his lands with Belgrade under his rule, in the same year his son Stefan Uroš III tried to overthrow him, resulting in him being exiled to Constantinople. In 1319 the Hungarians took all of Dragutin's lands but Braničevo.
	^{King of Srem (King of the Serbs)} Stefan Vladislav II	1316–1325	Son of Dragutin.
	^{King} Stefan Konstantin	1321–1322	Younger son of Stefan Uroš II, defeated in 1322 by his older brother, Stefan Uroš III.
	^{King} Stefan Uroš III Dečanski; Stefan of Dečani	1322–1331	Older brother of Stefan Konstantin
	^{Emperor ↑King} Stefan Dušan; Dušan the Mighty	1331–1355	Son of Uroš III. He was a very skilled military leader, and defeated Bosnia and Bulgaria at the age of 20. As his father was not an able conqueror, Dušan removed him from the throne. Dušan doubled the size of the realm, taking Byzantine lands as far as the Peloponnese. He was crowned Emperor in 1346. The Serbian Empire flourished, becoming one of the most developed countries and cultures in Europe. He enacted the constitution - Dušan's Code in 1349.
	^{Emperor} Stefan Uroš V Uroš the Weak	1355–1371	Son of Stefan Uroš IV Dušan, crowned King of Serbia (1346–1355), succeeds as Emperor after the death of Dušan in 1355. His epithet was given due to his "weak rule".
	^{Emperor of Serbs and Greeks (pretender)} Simeon Uroš	1359–1370	Uncle of Uroš V. He was appointed governor in the southwestern conquered regions in 1348, and ruled until 1355, when his brother-in-law Nikephoros II Orsini returned and rallied support. Nikephoros was killed in 1359, and Simeon continued his rule until his death in 1371. He proclaimed himself "Emperor of Serbs and Greeks" in 1356, however against the wishes of nobility of Serbia proper and Macedonia. After an unsuccessful invasion of Zeta, he gave up the idea of ruling Serbia. Note: Epirus breaks away: ^{Despot of Epirus} Thomas Preljubović / 1367–1384 / Grandson of Stefan Dušan.; ^{Basilissa of Epirus} Maria Angelina Doukaina Palaiologina / 1384–1385 / Daughter of Simeon Uroš.
	^{Emperor of Serbs and Greeks} Jovan Uroš	1370–1373	Son of Simeon Uroš. Succeeded his father as titular "Emperor of Serbs and Greeks" and ruled an area of Epirus and Thessaly 1370–1373 before taking monastic vows. In 1384–1385 he helped his sister Empress Maria Angelina Doukaina Palaiologina govern Epirus (she was the widow of Thomas II Preljubović, the Despot of Epirus 1367–1384).

== Fall of the medieval Serbian Empire (1371–1496) ==
=== Magnate provinces ===
Lazarević	Mrnjavčević	Dejanović	Branković	Vojinović	Balšić	Crnojević

The crumbling Serbian Empire under Stefan Uroš V (called "the Weak") was to be of little resistance to the powerful Ottoman Empire. In light of conflicts and decentralization of the realm, the Ottomans defeated the Serbs at the Battle of Maritsa in 1371, making vassals of the southern governors, soon thereafter, the Emperor died. As Uroš was childless and the nobility could not agree on the rightful heir, the Empire was ruled by semi-independent provincial lords, who often were in feuds with each other. The most powerful of these, Tsar Lazar, a Duke of present-day central Serbia (which had not yet come under the Ottoman yoke), stood against the Ottomans at the Battle of Kosovo in 1389. The result was indecisive, but it resulted in the subsequent fall of Serbia.

The administration was divided in the following:

- Moravian Serbia: Lazar, a nobleman and close friend of the Nemanjić, would govern modern Central Serbia. He married Milica, a descendant of Stefan Nemanja's eldest son Vukan. He held the title of Lord during the Empire, and Prince after the death of Uroš V. He had a son, Stefan, who would succeed as Prince, and in 1402 he was given the title despot (hence "Serbian Despotate").
- District of Branković: Vuk Branković, the son of Ohrid deputy Branko, would govern Sjenica, Kosovo and Skopje under the suzerainty of Lazar. He had a son, Đurađ Branković, who would succeed Despot Stefan. Their province continues as part of the Serbian Despotate.
- District of Altomanović: Nikola Altomanović ruled the areas from Rudnik, over Polimlje, Podrinje, east Herzegovina with Trebinje, reaching as far as Konavle and Dračevica, neighboring the Republic of Dubrovnik. He was defeated and blinded in Užice (fortress Užice) in 1373 by a coalition of his Serbian and Bosnian royals neighbors supported by the king of Hungary.
- Lordship of Zeta: Balša, a nobleman and distant relative of the Nemanjić, held only one town during Dušan, and during Uroš V, he is recognized as "provincial lord" holding Zeta region. He is succeeded by Đurađ, who ruled independently and was in rivalry with Marko. Đurađ II recognizes the overlordship of Lazar in 1386. The Balšić continue ruling Lower Zeta, while in Upper Zeta, Radič Crnojević take the rule, and by 1421 Crnojević held all Zeta under the Serbian Despotate. (see List of rulers of Zeta)
- Lordship of Prilep: King Vukašin, a nobleman and close friend of Uroš V, would govern most of the Macedonia region. He held the title of Lord during Dušan, and under Uroš V, he was crowned King as [subordinate] co-ruler in 1365. Vukašin ruled as "Lord of the Serbian and Greek lands, and of the western provinces." He was succeeded by Prince Marko, who became an Ottoman vassal. Their province is annexed by 1395.
- Domain of the Dejanović family: Dejan, a sebastokrator and brother-in-law of Dušan, would govern eastern regions from Kumanovo to Kyustendil. His sons, despot Jovan Dragaš and lord Constantine Dragaš inherited his domain and become Ottoman vassals in 1371. Their domain was annexed in 1395.
- Lordship of Voden: Radoslav Hlapen was a Serbian noble who ruled the Lordship of Voden, a late 14th-century feudal domain centered on Edessa (Voden) in western Aegean Macedonia, formed during the disintegration of the Serbian Empire. He governed the region until about 1375, when he was succeeded by his son-in-law Nikola Bagaš, who continued to rule as a semi-independent lord and later an Ottoman vassal until the Ottoman conquest of the area in 1385.

Picture	^{Title}Name	Reign	Overlordship	Notes
Moravian Serbia / Serbian Despotate (Lazarević)
	^{Lord, Prince} Lazar Hrebeljanović; Tsar Lazar	1371–1389	None	After Uroš V died, the last of the Nemanjić emperors, through a combination of diplomacy, military action, and family alliances, Lazar emerged from the resulting power vacuum as the most powerful Serbian noble not in the Ottomans' service. He acquired dynastic legitimacy by marrying Milica Nemanjić, and despite retaining only the minor title of knez ("prince"), he nevertheless used the imperial name of 'Stefan' as well as the designation "autocrator". Lazar spent his time strengthening the Serbian state, knowing fully well that he would eventually have to face the Ottoman threat. He unified most of Serbia under his rule and managed to gain the loyalty of a majority of the Serbs. He also ceded the title "King of Serbs" to King Tvrtko I of Bosnia (great-grandson of Uroš the Great). His first major military action was at the Battle of Dubravnica where his two subjects, Crep and Vladimir managed to decisively defeat an Ottoman army in southern Serbia. No further recorded hostilities took place until the Battle of Pločnik where Knez Lazar managed to crush an Ottoman force and drive them back to Niš. Serbian troops also took part in the Battle of Bileća where again he defeated the Turks. Lazar was killed during the 1389 Battle of Kosovo along with most of Serbia's political elite.
	^{Despote ↑Prince} Stefan Lazarević; Stefan the Tall	1389–1427	Ottoman 1391–1404----Hungarian 1404–1427	Son of Lazar. In 1391, Serbia became an Ottoman vassal, so Stefan was obliged to aid the Ottoman sultan in battles when asked. He did so in the Battle of Rovine in May 1395 against the Wallachian prince Mircea I and the Battle of Nicopolis in 1396 against the Hungarian king Sigismund. After that, Sultan Bayezid awarded Stefan with the Vuk Branković's land on Kosovo, as Branković sided with the Hungarian king at Nicopolis. When Mongols entered the Ottoman realm, Stefan Lazarević participated in the Battle of Angora in 1402 when Ottomans were defeated and sultan Bayezid was captured. Returning to Serbia, Stefan visited Constantinople where the Byzantine Emperor Manuel II Palaiologos granted him the title of despot. In previous years, title would mean that the despot would rule some vassal state, but as the Byzantine Empire was too weak to assert such a rule and Serbia was not its vassal state, Stefan Lazarević took this title as the personal style of the Serbian monarchs, thus the Principality of Serbia became the Serbian Despotate.
Picture	^{Title}Name	Reign	Overlordship	Notes
Lordship of Prilep (Mrnjavčević)
	^{King} Marko Mrnjavčević; Prince Marko	1371–1395	Ottoman	Son of Vukašin. Killed in the Battle of Rovine.
Picture	^{Title}Name	Reign	Overlordship	Notes
Lordship of Voden (Bagaš)
	^{Despot} Radoslav Hlapen	1371–1375		
	^{Lord} Nikola Bagaš	1375–1385	Ottoman	
Picture	^{Title}Name	Reign	Overlordship	Notes
Lordship of the Dejanović family (Dejanović)
	^{Despot} Jovan Dragaš Dejanović	1371–1378	Ottoman	
	^{Lord} Konstantin Dragaš Dejanović	1378–1395	Ottoman	Killed in the Battle of Rovine.
Picture	^{Title}Name	Reign	Overlordship	Notes
District of Altomanović (Vojinović)
	^{Grand Župan} Nikola Altomanović	1371–1373		Defeated and blinded in Užice in 1373 by a coalition of his Serbian and Bosnian royals neighbors.
Picture	^{Title}Name	Reign	Overlordship	Notes
Lordship of Zeta under the Balšić family (Balšić)
	^{Lord} Đurađ I	1371–1378		
	^{Lord} Balša II	1378–1385		Note: Lords of Valona and Kanina broke away from Zeta as independent rulers: ^{Lord} Mrkša Žarković / 1396–1414 / Son-in-law of Balša II.; ^{Lady} Ruđina Balšić / 1414–1417 / Daughter of Balša II.
	^{Lord} Đurađ II	1385–1403		
	^{Lord} Balša III	1403–1421		
Picture	^{Title}Name	Reign	Overlordship	Notes
Lordship of Zeta under the Crnojević family (Crnojević)
	^{Lord} Stefan; Stefanica	1451–1465		
	^{Lord} Ivan; Ivan the Black	1465–1490		
	^{Lord} Đurađ	1490–1496		
Note: Zeta under the Crnojevići is conquered by the Ottoman Empire. The Zetan nobility enters the service of the Ottoman Empire (titular lord of Zeta).
	Stefan II	1496–1499	nominal ruler under Ottoman suzerainty	Younger brother of Đurađ. Imprisoned by the Ottomans in 1499.

=== District of Branković / Serbian Despotate ===
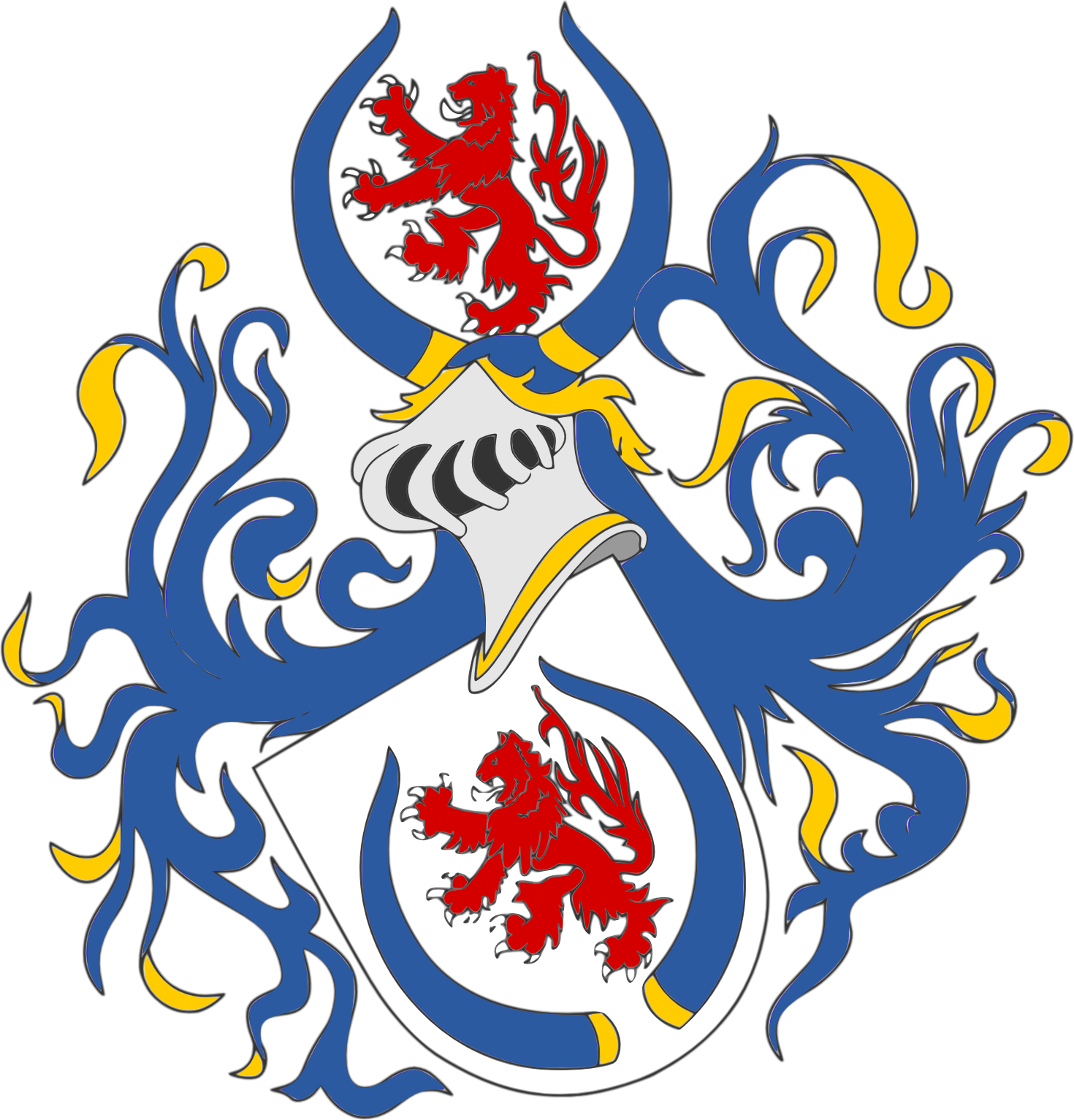
Branković

The Branković family descends from the Nemanjići and the Lazarevići via female line. The family rises to prominence during the time of disintegration of the Serbian Empire under the last Nemanjić. The original family domains were centred around Kosovo region, one of the heartlands of medieval Serbian state. Later members of the house extended their rule over all remaining independent regions of Serbia making them the last suzerain rulers of medieval Serbia. The dynasty ruled the Serbian Despotate from 1427 to 1459.

Picture	^{Title}Name	Reign	Notes
	^{Lord} Vuk Branković	1371 – 1396	Imprisoned and died in an Ottoman prison.
	^{Despot ↑Lord} Đurađ I Branković	1396 – 1412; 1427 – 26 December 1456	Grandson of Lazar I
	^{Despot} Lazar Branković	December 1456 – 20 January 1458	Son of Đurađ I
	^{Despot} Stefan Branković; Stefan the Blind	1458 – April 8, 1459	Son of Đurađ I, regent for niece. Serbia proper was annexed by the Ottoman Empire in 1459.
	^{Despot} Stephen Tomašević	1 April 1459 – 20 June 1459	He married Helena Branković, the eldest daughter of Lazar Branković and Helena Palaiologina.
Note: Serbian Despotate is conquered by the Ottoman Empire. The Serbian nobility enters the service of Hungary. The regnal title of despot is given by the Hungarians and Habsburgs (titular despot of Serbia).
	Vuk Grgurević Branković; Vuk the Fiery Dragon	1471–1485	Grandson of Đurađ I. In 1471 a dependent Serbian state was established by the Hungarians mostly on the territory of Vojvodina and Syrmia.
	Đorđe Branković	1486–1497	Son of Stefan Branković, abdicated
	Jovan Branković	1493–1502	Son of Stefan Branković
	Ivaniš Berislavić	1504–1514	Married widow of Jovan Branković.
	Stjepan Berislavić	1520–1535	Son of Ivaniš and Jelena. Deposed
	Radič Božić	1527–1528	Vassal of John Zapolya.
	Pavle Bakić	1537	Vassal of Ferdinand I. The last titular Despot of Serbia.

=== Second Serbian Empire and Duchy of Syrmia (1526–1532) ===
Picture	^{Title}Name	Reign	Territory	Notes
	^{Emperor of the Serbs (self-proclaimed)} Jovan Nenad; Jovan the Black	1526 – July 26, 1527	southern Pannonian Plain	Many Serbian historians consider him the founder of contemporary Vojvodina
	^{Duke} Radoslav Čelnik	1527 – 1532	Syrmia	He was general commander of Emperor Jovan Nenad's army.

== Habsburg-occupied Serbia ==
Picture	^{Title}Name Born - Died	Reign	Territory	Notes
	^{Vice Duke of Serbian Vojvodina} Jovan Monasterlija; 1660s–1706	1691–1706	Habsburg-occupied Serbia	"Chief of the Serbian Nation" under Leopold I
	^{King of Serbia} Charles III; October 1, 1685 – October 20, 1740	1718–1739	Habsburg Kingdom of Serbia	The Kingdom of Serbia was a crown land of the Habsburg monarchy
	^{Duke of Serbian Vojvodina} Stevan Šupljikac; 1786 – December 15, 1848	May 1, 1848 – December 15, 1848	Serbian Vojvodina	The Serbian Vojvodina was a short-lived self-proclaimed Serb autonomous province during the revolutions of 1848 in the Austrian Empire
	^{Grand Voivode of the Voivodeship of Serbia} Franz Joseph I August 18, 1830 – November 21, 1916	November 18, 1849 – December 27, 1860	Voivodeship of Serbia and Banat of Temeschwar	The Voivodeship of Serbia and Banat of Temeschwar was a crown land of the Austrian Empire

== Modern Serbia (1804–1918) ==
Karađorđević	Obrenović

=== Revolutionary Serbia (1804–1813) ===
Picture	^{Title}Name (Birth–Death)	Reign	Territory	Notes
	^{Grand Vožd of Serbia} Karađorđe Petrović; Black George (November 3, 1768 – July 24, 1817)	February 15, 1804 – September 21, 1813	Revolutionary Serbia	Leader of the First Serbian Uprising; Founder of Revolutionary Serbia and Karađorđević dynasty Deposed and exiled to Austria. Collapse of the First Serbian Uprising.

=== Principality of Serbia (1815–1882) ===
==== Obrenović dynasty (1815–1842) ====
Picture	^{Title}Name (Birth–Death)	Reign	Territory	Notes
	^{Grand Vožd of Serbia ↑Prince of Serbia} Miloš Obrenović I Miloš the Great (March 18, 1780 – September 26, 1860)	^{First reign} April 23, 1815 – June 25, 1839	Principality of Serbia	Leader of the Second Serbian Uprising; Founder of Principality of Serbia and Obrenović dynasty Elevated to the status of Prince on November 6, 1817. Abdicated.
	^{Prince of Serbia} Milan Obrenović II (October 21, 1819 – July 8, 1839)	June 25, 1839 – July 8, 1839	Principality of Serbia	Elder adult son of Miloš; ruled for only 13 days.
	^{Prince of Serbia} Mihailo Obrenović III (September 16, 1823 – June 10, 1868)	^{First reign} July 8, 1839 – September 14, 1842	Principality of Serbia	Younger adult son of Miloš; deposed by the Defenders of the Constitution.

==== Karađorđević dynasty (1842–1858) ====
Picture	^{Title}Name (Birth–Death)	Reign	Territory	Notes
	^{Prince of Serbia} Aleksandar Karađorđević (October 11, 1806 – May 3, 1885)	September 14, 1842 – December 23, 1858	Principality of Serbia	Abdicated. Return of Obrenović dynasty to power.

==== Obrenović dynasty (1858–1882) ====
Picture	^{Title}Name (Birth–Death)	Reign	Territory	Notes
	^{Prince of Serbia} Miloš Obrenović I Miloš the Great (March 18, 1780 – September 26, 1860)	^{Second reign} December 23, 1858 – September 26, 1860	Principality of Serbia	Died due to old age.
	^{Prince of Serbia} Mihailo Obrenović III (September 16, 1823 – June 10, 1868)	^{Second reign} September 26, 1860 – June 10, 1868	Principality of Serbia	Younger adult son of Miloš; assassinated in Košutnjak.
	^{King of Serbia ↑Prince of Serbia} Milan Obrenović IV (August 22, 1854 – February 11, 1901)	June 10, 1868 – March 6, 1882	Principality of Serbia	Grandnephew of Miloš; In 1878, Serbia gained full international recognition at the Congress of Berlin. In 1882, the country was elevated to the status of kingdom.

=== Kingdom of Serbia (1882–1918) ===
==== Obrenović dynasty (1882–1903) ====
Picture	^{Title}Name (Birth–Death)	Reign	Territory	Notes
	^{King of Serbia} Milan Obrenović IV (August 22, 1854 – February 11, 1901)	March 6, 1882 – March 6, 1889	Kingdom of Serbia	Abdicated.
	^{King of Serbia} Alexander I Obrenović (August 14, 1876 – June 11, 1903)	March 6, 1889 – June 11, 1903	Kingdom of Serbia	Assassinated together with Queen Draga in the May Coup. The end of Obrenović dynasty.

==== Karađorđević dynasty (1903–1918) ====
Picture	^{Title}Name (Birth–Death)	Reign	Territory	Notes
	^{King of Serbs, Croats, and Slovenes ↑King of Serbia} Peter I Karađorđević; King Peter the Liberator; Old King (June 29, 1844 – August 16, 1921)	June 15, 1903 – December 1, 1918	Kingdom of Serbia	Elder adult son of Aleksandar; in exile from November 1915 due to the Serbian campaign. Proclaimed King of Serbs, Croats, and Slovenes on December 1, 1918.
→				

== Kingdom of Yugoslavia (1918–1941) ==
Monarchs of Yugoslavia
- Royal Standard

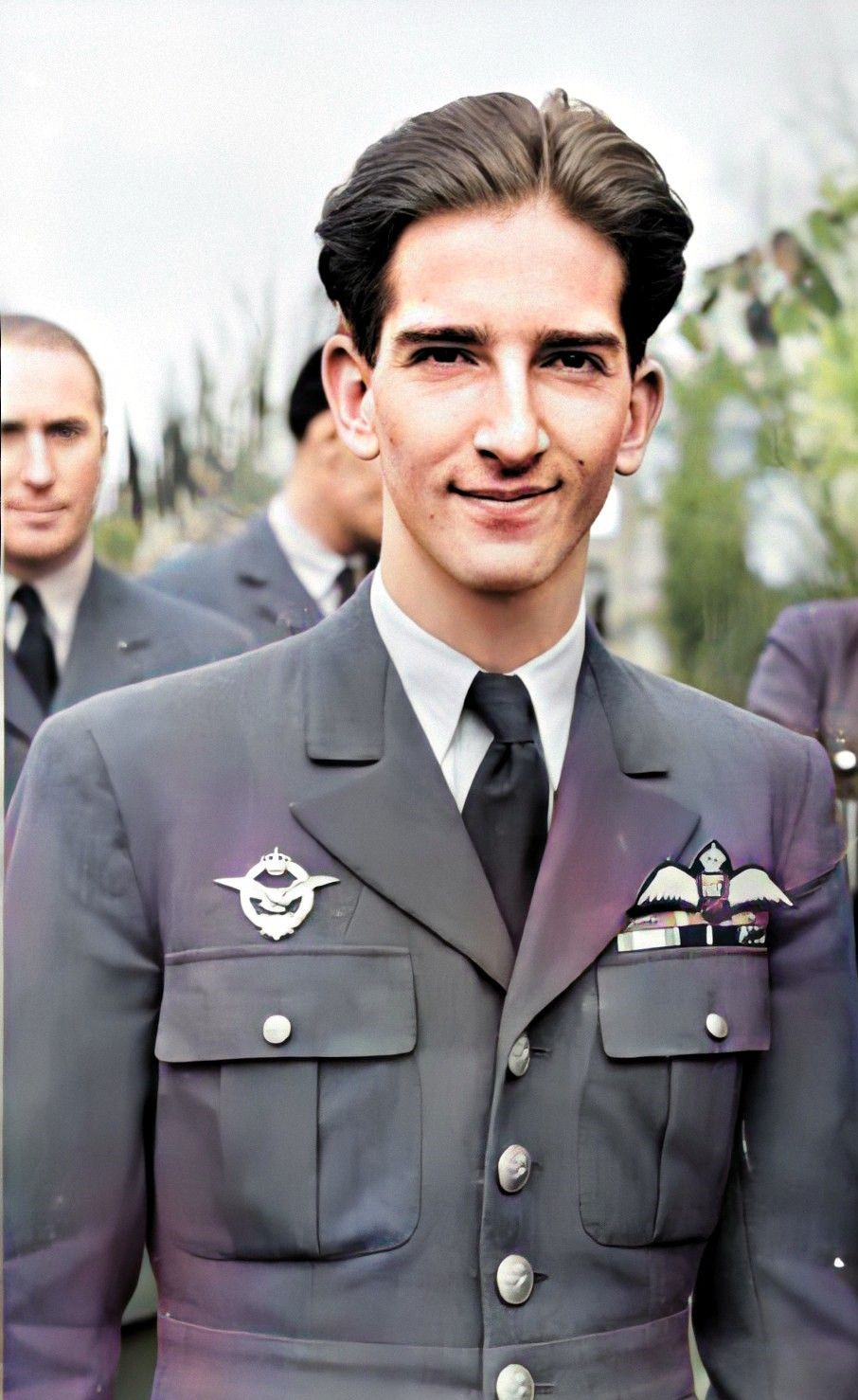
- Last monarch of Yugoslavia; Peter II; 6 September 1923 – 3 November 1970

Details
- Style: His Majesty
- First monarch: Peter I
- Last monarch: Peter II
- Formed: 1 December 1918
- Abolished: 29 November 1945 (proclamation of the socialist one-party dictatorship)
- Residences: Dedinje Royal Compound, Belgrade
- Appointer: Hereditary
- Pretender: Crown Prince Alexander of Yugoslavia

=== Karađorđević dynasty (1918–1945) ===
In 1918, Serbia became part of the newly formed Kingdom of Serbs, Croats, and Slovenes. Later that state changed name to the Kingdom of Yugoslavia (i.e. Kingdom of South Slavs) in 1929. During that interwar period the country was a parliamentary monarchy (except during the period of royal dictatorship 1929–1931), ruled by the house of Karađorđević.

Portrait	Name (Birth–Death)	Rule start	Rule end	Marriages	Succession right	Notes
Peter I of Serbs, Croats and Slovenes	Peter I Karađorđević; King Peter the Liberator (1844–1921)	1 December 1918	16 August 1921	Princess Zorka of Montenegro in 1883 (5 children)	Previously King of Serbia, proclaimed King by representatives of South Slav states	Held the title "King of Serbs, Croats and Slovenes". Prince Alexander served as regent in his final years.
Alexander I of Yugoslavia	Alexander I Karađorđević; Alexander the Unifier (1888–1934)	16 August 1921	9 October 1934	Maria of Yugoslavia on 8 June 1922 (3 children)	Son of the preceding	Changed title to "King of Yugoslavia" in 1929. Assassinated in Marseille.
Prince Paul of Yugoslavia	Paul Karađorđević (1893–1976)	9 October 1934	27 March 1941	Olga of Greece and Denmark on 22 October 1923 (3 children)	Cousin of the preceding	Prince Paul with Radenko Stanković, Ivo Perović as the regent for King Peter II.
Peter II of Yugoslavia	Peter II Karađorđević (1923–1970)	9 October 1934	29 November 1945	Alexandra of Greece and Denmark on 20 March 1944 (1 child)	Son of the preceding	Prince Paul acted as regent until ousted on 27 March 1941; exiled on 17 April 1941 and deposed on 29 November 1945.

After World War II and the civil war Yugoslavia became a communist state known as the Socialist Federal Republic of Yugoslavia, ruled by Josip Broz Tito and the League of Communists of Yugoslavia. After Tito's death in 1980, the federation started a process of dissolution which finished in a series of civil wars in the early 1990s. Through the 1990s, constituent republics Serbia and Montenegro comprised the Federal Republic of Yugoslavia, which was restructured in 2003 into a confederation called Serbia and Montenegro. The state union ended with Montenegro's independence following the 2006 independence referendum. Currently Serbia is a parliamentary republic. There was no referendum of restoration of parliamentary monarchy, although political organizations and a certain public in favor of it do exist.

== See also ==
- List of heads of state of Serbia, for a comprehensive list of Serbian heads of state since 1804
- List of heads of state of Yugoslavia
- List of presidents of Serbia
- President of Serbia
- President of Serbia and Montenegro
- Regalia of Serbia
- Burial sites of Serbian monarchs

== Sources ==
- Moravcsik, Gyula, ed. (1967) [1949]. Constantine Porphyrogenitus: De Administrando Imperio (2nd revised ed.). Washington D.C.: Dumbarton Oaks Center for Byzantine Studies. ISBN 9780884020219.
- Ćirković, Sima (2004). The Serbs. Malden: Blackwell Publishing. ISBN 9781405142915.
- Fine, John V. A. Jr. (1991) [1983]. The Early Medieval Balkans: A Critical Survey from the Sixth to the Late Twelfth Century. Ann Arbor: University of Michigan Press. ISBN 0-472-08149-7.
- Fine, John V. A. (1994) [1987]. The Late Medieval Balkans: A Critical Survey from the Late Twelfth Century to the Ottoman Conquest. Ann Arbor, Michigan: University of Michigan Press. ISBN 978-0-472-10079-8.
- Živković, Tibor (2006). Portreti srpskih vladara (IX—XII vek). Belgrade. ISBN 86-17-13754-1.
- Živković, Tibor (2007). "The Golden Seal of Stroimir" (PDF). Historical Review. 55. Belgrade: The Institute for History: 23–29. Archived from the original (PDF) on 2018-03-24.
