= Second Bulgar–Serb War =

War between the First Bulgarian Empire and the Serbian Principality

Bulgar–Serb War (853)
- Part of the Bulgarian–Serbian wars (medieval)
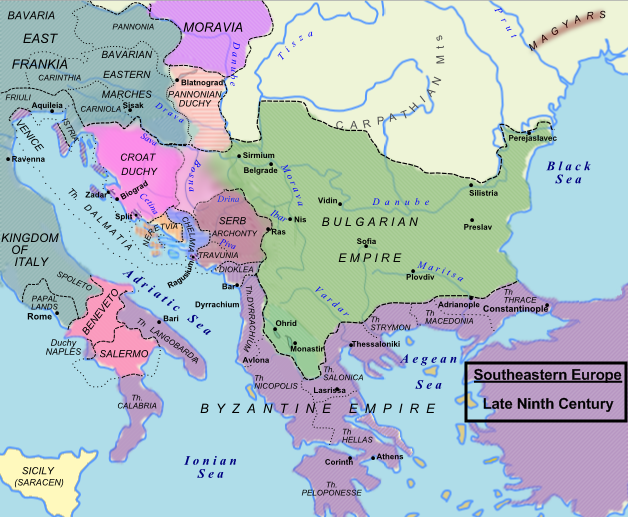
- Serb lands in the 9th century
Date	853 or 854
Location	Central Balkans
Result	Serbian victory

Belligerents
First Bulgarian Empire	Principality of Serbian

Commanders and leaders
Boris I Vladimir-Rasate (POW)	Mutimir; Strojimir; Gojnik

Casualties and losses
Vladimir and 12 boyars captured	

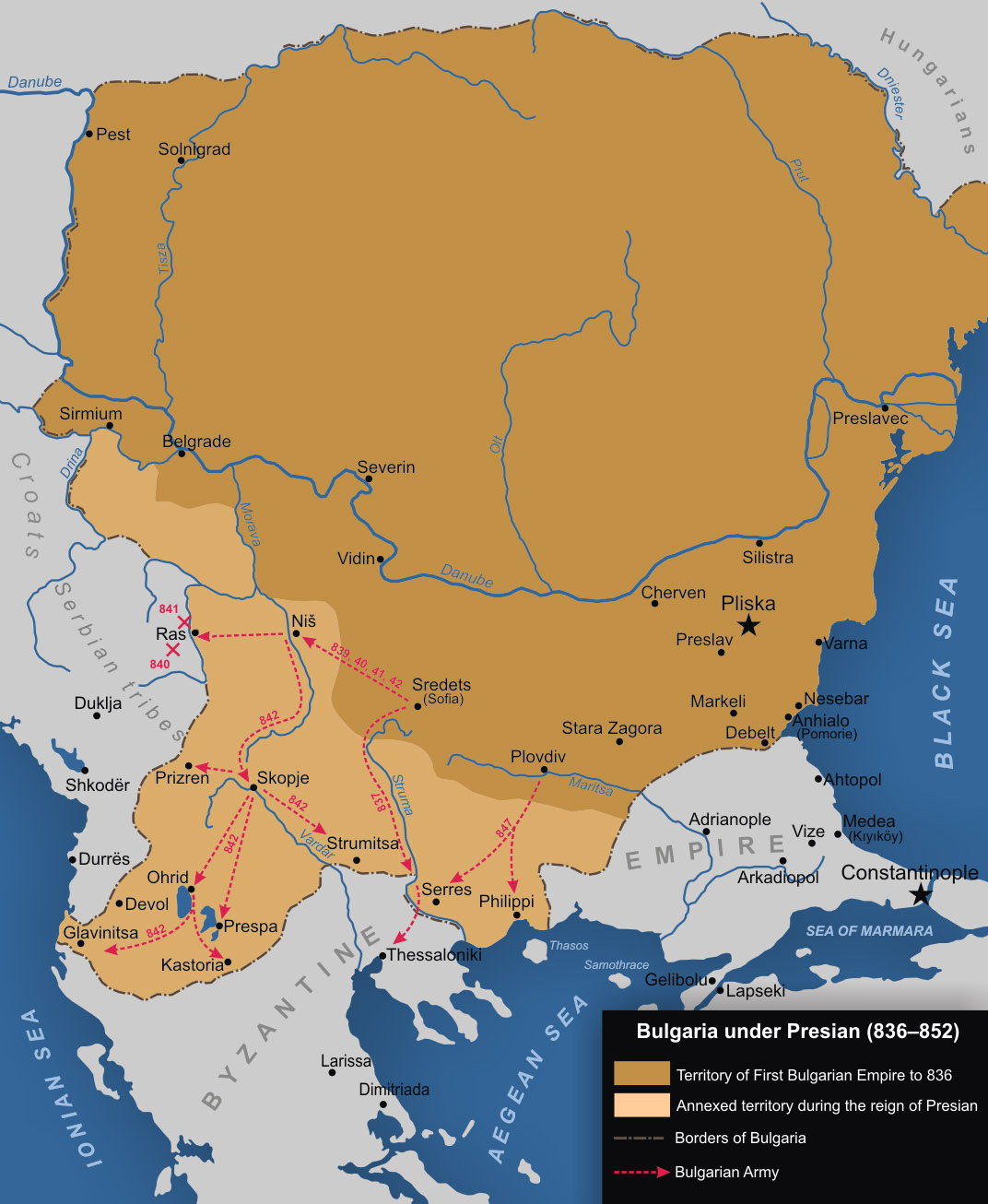
Bulgarian Kingdom in the 9th century and its territorial expansion under Krum, Omurtag and Presian

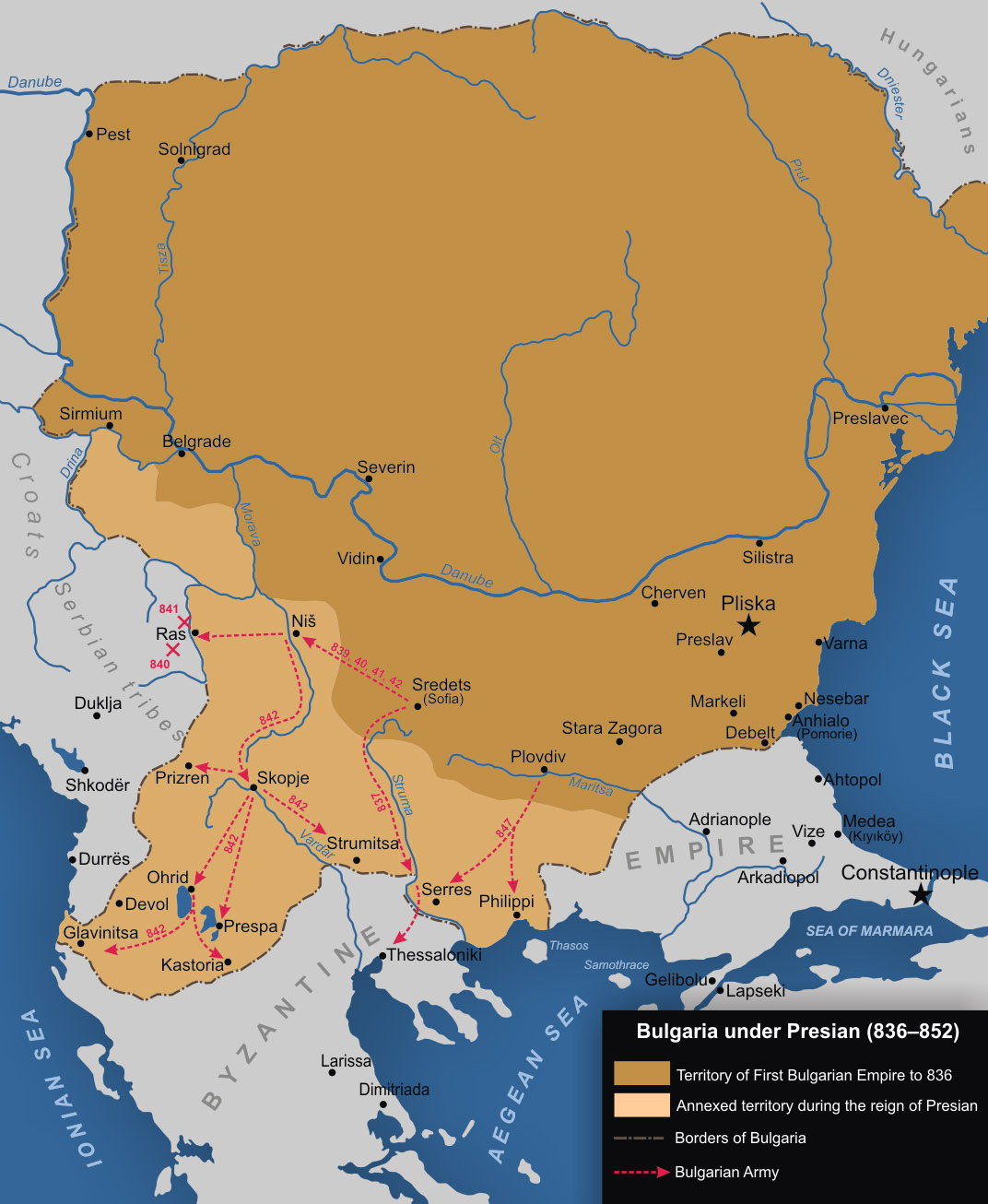
Bulgarian Kingdom in the 9th century and its territorial expansion under Krum, Omurtag and Presian

The Bulgarian–Serbian War of 853 was a conflict between the First Bulgarian Empire and the Serbian Principality. It was one of the early conflicts in the medieval Bulgarian–Serbian wars.

The conflict took place during the reign of Boris I of Bulgaria and the Serbian ruler Mutimir. Bulgarian forces were defeated by the Serbs, and Vladimir-Rasate and twelve Bulgarian boyars were captured during the fighting. The prisoners were subsequently released after negotiations between the two sides.

== Prelude and the War ==
After the death of Prince Vlastimir of Serbia in c. 850, his state was divided between his sons. Vlastimir and Presian, Boris' father, had fought each other in the Bulgar-Serb War (839–42), which resulted in a Serbian victory. Boris sought to avenge that defeat, an in 853 or 854, the Bulgar army led by Vladimir-Rasate, the son of Boris I, invaded Serbia, with the aim to replace the Byzantine overlordship on the Serbs. The Serbian army was led by Mutimir and his two brothers, who defeated the Bulgars, capturing Vladimir and 12 boyars. Boris I and Mutimir agreed on peace (and perhaps an alliance), and Mutimir sent his sons Pribislav and Stefan to the border to escort the prisoners, where they exchanged items as a sign of peace. Boris himself gave them "rich gifts", while he was given "two slaves, two falcons, two dogs, and 80 furs".

== Aftermath ==
An internal conflict among the Serbian brothers resulted in Mutimir banishing the two younger brothers to the Bulgarian court. Mutimir, however, kept a nephew, Petar, in his court for political reasons. The reason of the feud is not known, though it is postulated that it was a result of treachery. Petar would later defeat Pribislav, Mutimir's son, and take the Serbian throne.

== See also ==
- Bulgarian–Serbian medieval wars
- Bulgar-Serb War (839–42)
- Medieval Bulgarian Army
- Medieval Serbian Army

== Sources ==
Primary sources

- Moravcsik, Gyula, ed. (1967) [1949]. Constantine Porphyrogenitus: De Administrando Imperio (2nd revised ed.). Washington D.C.: Dumbarton Oaks Center for Byzantine Studies. ISBN 978-0-88402-021-9.

Secondary sources

- Bury, John B. (2008) [1912]. History of the Eastern Empire from the Fall of Irene to the Accession of Basil: A.D. 802-867. New York: Cosimo. ISBN 978-1-60520-421-5.
- Ćirković, Sima (2004). The Serbs. Malden: Blackwell Publishing. ISBN 978-1-4051-4291-5.
- Curta, Florin (2006). Southeastern Europe in the Middle Ages, 500–1250. Cambridge: Cambridge University Press.
- Fine, John Van Antwerp Jr. (1991) [1983]. The Early Medieval Balkans: A Critical Survey from the Sixth to the Late Twelfth Century. Ann Arbor, Michigan: University of Michigan Press. ISBN 0-472-08149-7.
