= Klonimir =

9th-century Serbian prince

Klonimir Клонимир

Pretender to the Serbian throne
- Reign: c. 896
- Predecessor: Petar
- Successor: Petar
- Born: Serbian Principality
- Died: c. 896; Serbian Principality
- Spouse: Bulgarian noblewoman
- Issue: Časlav
- Dynasty: Vlastimirović
- Father: Strojimir
- Religion: Chalcedonian Christianity

Klonimir (Serbian Cyrillic: Клонимир; Greek: Κλονίμηρος; fl. 896) was a Serbian prince of the Vlastimirović dynasty, and pretender to the throne of the Serbian Principality. His father and uncle, co-princes Strojimir and Gojnik, had been exiled to Bulgaria with their families after their eldest brother Mutimir had ousted them and taken the Serbian throne. Klonimir married a Bulgarian noblewoman chosen by Khan Boris I himself. She later gave birth to a son named Časlav. The descendants of the three Vlastimirović branches continued the feud over the Serbian throne which spanned over the century, and Klonimir returned to Serbia in ca. 896 and attempted to take the country from his cousin Petar, who had ruled since 891. He managed to take over the Serbian city of Destinikon, but the much more powerful Petar defeated him, and it is presumed that Klonimir died in battle. His son Časlav later became the most powerful of the Vlastimirović dynasty, as Prince of Serbia from 927 to 960, unifying several tribes in the region.

== Life ==
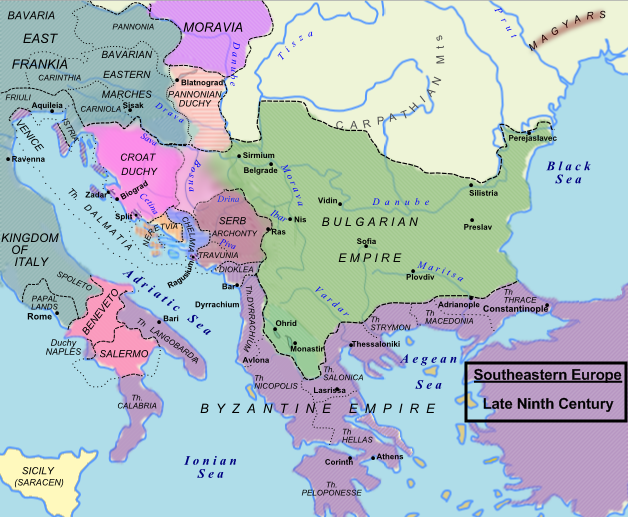
Serb lands in the late 9th century.

The history of the early medieval Serbian Principality and the Vlastimirović dynasty (ruled ca. 610–960) is recorded in the work De Administrando Imperio (On the Governance of the Empire), compiled by the Byzantine Emperor Constantine VII Porphyrogenitus (r. 913–959). Vlastimir, the eponymous founder of the Vlastimirović dynasty and the ruling Serbian Prince (archon) in the period of ca. 830–851, was a Byzantine ally who had managed to devastate the Bulgars in a three-year war (839–842), and greatly expand the Serbian realm to the west. Upon his death, the rule was inherited by his three sons, Mutimir, Strojimir and Gojnik, though supreme rule was held by the eldest, Mutimir. The three brothers successfully fought off a Bulgarian attack in 853 or 854 (shortly after the death of Vlastimir), when they had managed to capture 12 great boyars and the commander himself, Vladimir, the son of Khan Boris I of Bulgaria (r. 852–889). The Bulgars sought to avenge the defeat of their previous Khan, Presian. The Serbs and Bulgars then made peace, and possibly formed an alliance.

A quarrel eventually broke out between Vlastimir's three sons. Mutimir, the eldest, sought supreme leadership of the Serbian throne; as the co-ruling younger brothers, Strojimir and Gojnik, resisted, he had them captured and exiled to Bulgaria, where they were most likely held as hostages at the Bulgarian court at Pliska, after 855/856. According to V. Ćorović, Boris wanted to gain influence on these events in Serbia and sought to help those who could stand on the Bulgarian side instead of the Byzantine, and thus he graciously received the two younger brothers, holding them as weapons for his needs. Evidence of this is the fact that Boris himself chose a Bulgarian noblewoman to marry Strojimir's son, Klonimir. It seems that the exiled families were treated well in Bulgaria, with respect to their status. Mutimir had not exiled all members of his brother's families, but had retained his nephew Petar, the son of Gojnik, at the Serbian court for political reasons, although Petar later feared his father's fate and eventually escaped across the western border to Croatia. The descendants of Vlastimir's sons continued to fight for the throne over the century. An important event was the Christianization of the Serbs which began in 870, accompanied by strong political and cultural influences from the Byzantine Empire.

After Mutimir's death in 890 or 891, the rule of Serbia was inherited by Mutimir's three sons Pribislav, Bran and Stefan (called the Mutimirović), headed by the eldest son, Pribislav. However, Pribislav's reign only lasted less than a year, ending when his cousin Petar returned to Serbia from Croatia and won a battle against Pribislav. Petar acquired the Serbian throne in ca. 892. Mutimir's three sons then left Serbia for Croatia where they sought refuge and help. In ca. 894, Bran tried to oust Petar with Croatian help but was unsuccessful; he was captured and blinded (according to political mutilation culture). In ca. 896, Klonimir left Bulgaria and marched an army into Serbia, entering the Serbian city of Destinikon (Greek: Δεστινίκον, also spelled Destinika and Serbian: Desnica), with the intent of seizing the throne. This city's exact location is undetermined, as De Administrando Imperio only lists it as one of eight fortified cities (καστρα) of baptized Serbia (not counting those of the maritime Serbian principalities). Klonimir was likely supported by the Bulgarians, which shows that Petar had bad relations with Bulgaria. However, Klonimir was unsuccessful, and the powerful Petar slew him. A little while afterwards, Petar was recognized as the ruler of Serbia by Bulgarian Tsar Symeon, resulting in a twenty-year peace and alliance.

== Aftermath ==
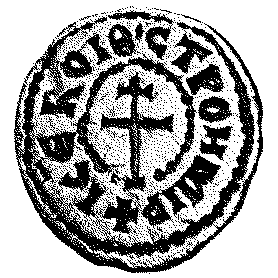
Seal of prince Strojimir of Serbia (late 9th century)

Petar ruled at peace with the Bulgars, though he was probably not happy with his subordinate position, and may have dreamed of reasserting his independence. His situation and the succession wars of the three branches of Vlastimir's sons was to play a key part in the coming Bulgarian–Byzantine War. However, according to De Administrando Imperio, Petar would have ruled under the suzerainty of Leo VI.

Klonimir's son, Časlav, was sent with Bulgarian aid to conquer Serbia in 924. The Bulgarians tricked him and annexed Serbia, until Časlav returned from exile in 927 after Symeon's death and asserted his rule over Serbia in a Byzantine alliance.

On July 11, 2006, the Serbian government bought a Byzantine-styled seal in solid gold weighing 15,64 g, most likely belonging to Strojimir (Klonimir's father), at an auction in Munich. It was presumably crafted outside Byzantium, and has a Greek inscription (KE BOIΘ CTPOHMIP, "God Help Strojimir") and a patriarchal cross in the centre. It most likely dates to the second half of the 9th century, between 855/56 and 896, when Klonimir tried to take the Serbian throne.

== Annotations ==
1. In De Administrando Imperio, his name is written as Greek: Κλονίμηρος (Klonimeros, Klonimiros), rendered as Klonimir in Serbian (Клонимир). His name has been transcribed into Latin as Clonimerus (J. Meursis, G. S. Assemani and J. G. Stritter) and Clonimer (G. Lucio and A. Banduri). His full name in historiography is written as Klonimir Strojimirović (Клонимир Стројимировић) and scarcely as Klonimir Vlastimirović (Клонимир Властимировић). The name Klonimir is derived from the Slavic imperative mood (verb) kloniti, and the common mir.
2. According to De Administrando Imperio, Klonimir's failed conquest came two years after Bran's attack.
  - T. Živković, J. v. A. Fine, V. Ćorović, K. Jireček, S. M. Ćirković, J. Lelewel, date it to 896.
  - Č. Popov, F. Šišić, J. Jireček, P. J. Šafárik, date it to 897.
  - F. Curta, B. Ferjančić, date it to 897 or 898.

== Sources ==
Primary sources

- Moravcsik, Gyula, ed. (1967) [1949]. Constantine Porphyrogenitus: De Administrando Imperio (2nd revised ed.). Washington D.C.: Dumbarton Oaks Center for Byzantine Studies. ISBN 9780884020219.

Secondary sources

- Ćirković, Sima (2004). The Serbs. Malden: Blackwell Publishing. ISBN 9781405142915.
- Ćorović, Vladimir (2001). Istorija Srpskog Naroda [History of the Serb People] (in Serbian) (Internet ed.). Belgrade: Ars Libri.
- Ferjančić, Božidar (1966). Vizantija i Južni Sloveni [Byzantium and the South Slavs] (in Serbo-Croatian). Belgrade: Zavod za izdavanje udžbenika Socijalističke Republike Srbije.
- Curta, Florin (2006). Southeastern Europe in the Middle Ages, 500–1250. Cambridge: Cambridge University Press. ISBN 9780521815390.
- Fine, John Van Antwerp Jr. (1991) [1983]. The Early Medieval Balkans: A Critical Survey from the Sixth to the Late Twelfth Century. Ann Arbor, Michigan: University of Michigan Press. ISBN 0472081497.
- Grčić, Mirko; Grčić, Ljiljana (2012). "The first populated cities of christened Serbia in X century by Constantine Porphyrogenitus, on the map of Guillaume Delisle" (PDF). Bulletin of the Serbian Geographical Society (in Serbian and English). XCII (2).
- Kovačević, Ljubomir; Jovanović, Ljubomir (2002). Istorija Srpskoga Naroda: Najstarija Istorija, Volume 1. Čigoja štampa.
- Korać, Vojislav (1995). "Architecture in medieval Serbia". In Ivić, Pavle (ed.). The History of Serbian Culture. Randall A. Major (transl.). Porthill Publishers. ISBN 1-870732-31-6.
- Novaković, Relja (1981). Gde se Nalazila Srbija od VII do X Veka [Where Serbia was situated from the 7th to 10th centuries]. Serbia, Belgrade: Narodna knjiga. pp. 61–63.
- Runciman, Steven (1930). "Excursion into the West". A History of the First Bulgarian Empire. London: G. Bell & Sons.
- Šafárik, Pavel Jozef (1837). Slowanské Starožitnosti, Volume 1. Tiskem I. Spurného.
- Stephenson, Paul (2000). Byzantium's Balkan Frontier: A Political Study of the Northern Balkans, 900-1204. Cambridge: Cambridge University Press. ISBN 0-521-77017-3.
- Živković, Tibor (2006). Portreti Srpskih Vladara (IX—XII Vek) (in Serbian). Belgrade. pp. 11–20. ISBN 86-17-13754-1.
- Živković, Tibor (2007). "The Golden Seal of Stroimir" (PDF). Historical Review. 55. Belgrade: The Institute for History: 23–29. Archived from the original (PDF) on 2018-03-24.

Klonimir Vlastimirović dynasty
Preceded by Petar	— TITULAR — Serbian Prince ca. 896; Reason for succession failure: Battle defeat	Succeeded by Petar
