= Strojimir =

- Prince (archon) of Serbs / Serbia
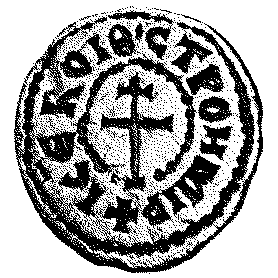
- Seal

Prince of Serbia (co-ruler)
- Reign: 851–880s
- Predecessor: Vlastimir
- Successor: Mutimir (sole)
- Died: between 880 and 896
- Issue: Klonimir
Names
- Strojimir Vlastimirović (Стројимир Властимировић)
- House: Vlastimirović
- Father: Vlastimir
- Religion: Chalcedonian Christianity (under the jurisdiction of the Church of Rome)

Strojimir (Serbian Cyrillic: Стројимир; Greek: Στροΐμηρος, romanized: Stroḯmēros) was the co-ruler of the Serbian Principality alongside his two brothers Mutimir and Gojnik, from ca 851 to his and Gojnik's deposition in the 880s after an unsuccessful coup against the eldest Prince Mutimir (r. 851–891).

He was a younger son of Vlastimir, who ruled in c. 836–851. Strojimir, together with his brothers Gojnik and Mutimir, defeated the Bulgarian Army sent by Boris I, led by his son Vladimir, who, together with 12 boyars was captured by the Serb Army. Peace was subsequently agreed and the two sons of Mutimir; Pribislav and Stefan Mutimirović escorted prisoners towards the border at Rasa. There Boris gave them rich gifts and was given 2 slaves, 2 falcons, two dogs, and 80 furs by Mutimir.

After power struggle between the younger brothers and Mutimir, he and Gojnik was captured and sent as prisoners to Bulgarian Khan Boris I in 855–856, as a token of peace-agreement, they both lost their titles as Princes of Serbia and were held at Pliska, the Bulgarian capital. Strojimir was treated well by the Bulgarians, Khan Boris himself chose the wife of Klonimir, the son of Strojimir.

== The Seal of Strojimir ==
On July 11, 2006, the Serbian government bought a Byzantine-styled seal in solid gold weighing 15,64 g, most likely belonging to Strojimir (Klonimir's father), at an auction in Munich. It was presumably crafted outside Byzantium, and has a Greek inscription (KE BOIΘ CTPOHMIP, "God Help Strojimir") and a patriarchal cross in the centre. It most likely dates to the second half of the 9th century, between 855/56 and 896, when Klonimir tried to take the Serbian throne.

== Sources ==
- Moravcsik, Gyula, ed. (1967) [1949]. Constantine Porphyrogenitus: De Administrando Imperio (2nd revised ed.). Washington D.C.: Dumbarton Oaks Center for Byzantine Studies. ISBN 9780884020219.
- Ćirković, Sima (2004). The Serbs. Malden: Blackwell Publishing. ISBN 9781405142915.
- Curta, Florin (2006). Southeastern Europe in the Middle Ages, 500–1250. Cambridge: Cambridge University Press.
- Ferjančić, B. (1997). "Василије I и обнова византијске власти у IX веку". Zbornik radova Vizantološkog instituta (36): 9–30.
- Fine, John Van Antwerp Jr. (1991) [1983]. The Early Medieval Balkans: A Critical Survey from the Sixth to the Late Twelfth Century. Ann Arbor, Michigan: University of Michigan Press. ISBN 0472081497.
- Ostrogorsky, George (1956). History of the Byzantine State. Oxford: Basil Blackwell.
- Petrović, R. (2007). "Zlatni pečatni privezak kneževića Strojimira". Naučni projekt Filozofskog fakulteta u K. Mitrovici. 1.
- Runciman, Steven (1930). A History of the First Bulgarian Empire. London: G. Bell & Sons. ISBN 9780598749222.
- Vlasto, Alexis P. (1970). The Entry of the Slavs into Christendom: An Introduction to the Medieval History of the Slavs. Cambridge: Cambridge University Press. ISBN 9780521074599.
- Живковић, Тибор (2006). Портрети српских владара: IX-XII век (Portraits of Serbian Rulers: IX-XII Century). Београд: Завод за уџбенике и наставна средства. ISBN 9788617137548.
- Živković, Tibor (2007). "The Golden Seal of Stroimir" (PDF). Historical Review. 55. Belgrade: The Institute for History: 23–29.

Strojimir Vlastimirović dynasty Born: 830s Died: 880-896
Regnal titles
Preceded by Vlastimir	Prince of Serbia; 851-880s Served alongside: Mutimir and Gojnik	Succeeded by Mutimir as sole ruler of Serbia
