= Gojnik =

- Župan (Prince)
- Reign: ca. 850-860
- Predecessor: Vlastimir
- Died: before 896
- Issue: Petar Gojniković
- House: House of Vlastimirović
- Father: Vlastimir
- Religion: Eastern Orthodox

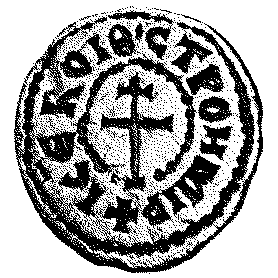
Seal of Gojnik's brother, prince Strojimir of Serbia, from the late 9th century

Gojnik Vlastimirović or Gojnik of Serbia (Serbian: Гојник, Latin: Goinicus) was a Serbian Župan who was subject to his elder brother Mutimir, the Grand Župan of the Serbian lands (Rascia) from ca. 850–860 with his brother Strojimir. He was the youngest son of Vlastimir of Serbia, the first independent ruler of Rascia.

Gojnik, together with his brothers Strojimir and Mutimir, defeated the Bulgar Army sent by Tsar Boris and led by his son Vladimir, who was together with 12 boyars captured by the Serbs. Peace was agreed and two sons of Mutimir (Pribislav and Stefan) escorted prisoners towards the border at Stari Ras. There Boris gave them rich gifts and was given 2 slaves, 2 falcons, two dogs, and 80 furs by Mutimir.

Soon after this in the 860s the younger brothers start a rebellion against Mutimir after he had given them less and less power. Mutimir crushes the rebellion and the two brothers are sent as prisoners, a guarantee of peace, to Tsar Boris I court at Pliska, the Bulgar capital. He was treated well by the Bulgarians, Khan Boris himself chose the wife of Klonimir Strojimirović, the only son of Strojimir.

In 2006, a golden seal of Gojnik's brother, prince Strojimir, dated to 855–896, was bought by the Serbian state from an auction in Munich, Germany, from an unknown Russian. It was sold for a total €20,000, topping the Bulgarian offer of €15,000 . It is of Byzantine handcraft (from Athens, Thessaloniki or Constantinople), weighs 15.64 g, has a cross and Greek inscription: "God, help Strojimir".

== Sources ==
- Moravcsik, Gyula, ed. (1967) [1949]. Constantine Porphyrogenitus: De Administrando Imperio (2nd revised ed.). Washington D.C.: Dumbarton Oaks Center for Byzantine Studies. ISBN 9780884020219.
- Ćirković, Sima (2004). The Serbs. Malden: Blackwell Publishing. ISBN 9781405142915.
- Curta, Florin (2006). Southeastern Europe in the Middle Ages, 500–1250. Cambridge: Cambridge University Press.
- Fine, John Van Antwerp Jr. (1991) [1983]. The Early Medieval Balkans: A Critical Survey from the Sixth to the Late Twelfth Century. Ann Arbor, Michigan: University of Michigan Press. ISBN 0472081497.
- Ferjančić, B. 1997, "Basile I et la restauration du pouvoir byzantin au IXème siècle", Zbornik Radova Vizantološkog Instituta, no. 36, pp. 9–30.
- Ostrogorsky, George (1956). History of the Byzantine State. Oxford: Basil Blackwell.
- Runciman, Steven (1930). A History of the First Bulgarian Empire. London: G. Bell & Sons. ISBN 9780598749222.
- Vlasto, Alexis P. (1970). The Entry of the Slavs into Christendom: An Introduction to the Medieval History of the Slavs. Cambridge: Cambridge University Press. ISBN 9780521074599.
- Živković, Tibor (2007). "The Golden Seal of Stroimir" (PDF). Historical Review. 55. Belgrade: The Institute for History: 23–29. Archived from the original (PDF) on 2018-03-24.

Regnal titles
Preceded by Vlastimir	Knez of Serbia; Co-ruler with Mutimir and Strojimir ca. 850-860s	Succeeded by (Deposed); Mutimir; Sole ruler
