= Principality of Serbia (early medieval) =

Early medieval state in Southeastern Europe (7th–10th century)

Principality of Serbia Кнежевина Србија Kneževina Srbija
- 780–960
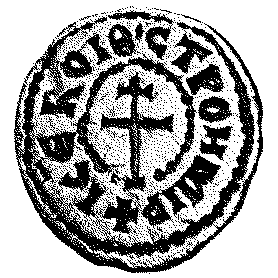
- Seal of Prince Strojimir

- Principality of Serbia in 814
- Capital: various Destinikon
- Common languages: Old Serbian
- Religion: Slavic paganism (before 860s); Christianity (after 870)
- Demonyms: Serbian, Serb
- Government: Tribal state
- Prince
  - 7th century: Unnamed archon
  - c. 780: Višeslav
  - <830: Radoslav
  - <830: Prosigoj
  - 850–891: Mutimir
  - 891–892: Pribislav
  - 892–917: Petar
  - 917–921: Pavle
  - 921–925/926: Zaharija
  - 933–943/960: Časlav
- Historical era: Early Middle Ages
  - Established: 780
  - Byzantine annexation: 960
Preceded by
Byzantine Empire
Succeeded by
Catepanate of Ras
Duklja
Grand Principality of Serbia

Principality of Serbia (Serbian: Кнежевина Србија/Kneževina Srbija) was one of the early medieval states of the Serbs, located in the western regions of Southeastern Europe. It existed from the 8th century up to c. 969–971 and was ruled by the Vlastimirović dynasty.

Its first ruler known by name was Višeslav, who started ruling around 780, while by that time (starting from the years 680–681), the Bulgarian state had taken the lands to the east. Vlastimir resisted and defeated the Bulgarian army in a three-year-war (839–842), and the two powers lived in peace for some decades. Vlastimir's three sons succeeded in ruling Serbia together, although for a limited time; Serbia became a key part in the power struggle between the Byzantines and Bulgarians, predominantly allied with the Byzantines, which also resulted in major dynastic wars for a period of three decades. The principality was annexed in 924 by Simeon I and subjected to Bulgarian rule until 933 when Serbian prince Časlav was established as ruler of the Serbian land, becoming the most powerful ruler of the Vlastimirović dynasty.

An important process during this period was the Christianization of the Serbs, completed by the establishment of Christianity as state-religion in the second half of the 9th century. The principality was annexed by the Byzantine Empire in c. 969–971 and ruled as the Catepanate of Ras. The main information of the history of the principality and Vlastimirović dynasty are recorded in the contemporary historical work De Administrando Imperio (written c. 948–949).

== Background ==
Slavs (Sklavenoi) settled throughout the Balkans during the 6th and the 7th centuries, thus marking the end of the early Byzantine rule in those regions. The history of the early medieval Serbian principality and the Vlastimirović dynasty is recorded in the work De Administrando Imperio (On the Governance of the Empire, abbr. "DAI"), compiled by the Byzantine Emperor Constantine VII Porphyrogenitus (r. 913–959). The work mentions the first Serbian ruler, without a name (known conventionally as "Unknown Archon"), that led the White Serbs to southeastern Europe and received the protection of Emperor Heraclius (r. 610–641), prior to the Bulgar invasion (680). The Serbian ruler was titled "Prince (archon) of the Serbia" (αρχων Σερβλίας). The DAI mentions that this ruler was succeeded by a son, followed by a grandson, and historians generally accept the accounts of DAI on succession of princes from the same family, but their names are unknown until the coming of Višeslav (c. 780-800).

== History ==
=== Višeslav, Radoslav and Prosigoj (780–830) ===
The time and circumstances of the first three Serbian rulers are almost unknown. The first of the dynasty known by name was Višeslav who began his rule around 780, being a contemporary of Charlemagne (fl. 768–814).

The Serbs at that time were organized into župe (sing. župa), a confederation of village communities (roughly the equivalent of a county), headed by a local župan (a magistrate or governor); the governorship was hereditary, and the župan reported to the Serbian prince, whom they were obliged to aid in war. According to DAI, "baptized Serbia" included the "inhabited cities" (kastra) of Destinikon (Δεστινίκον), Tzernabouskeï (Τζερναβουσκέη), Megyretous (Μεγυρέτους), Dresneïk (Δρεσνεήκ), Lesnik (Λεσνήκ), and Salines (Σαληνές), while the "small land" (χοριον/chorion) of Bosnia (Βοσωνα), part of Serbia, had the cities of Katera (Κατερα) and Desnik (Δέσνηκ). The other Serb-inhabited lands (or principalities) that were mentioned included the "countries" of Paganija, Zahumlje and Travunija, while the "land" of Duklja was held by the Byzantines (it was presumably settled with Serbs as well). Given the large territory, the Serbs most likely arrived as a small military elite which managed to organize and assimilate other already settled and more numerous Slavs. These polities bordered "Serbia" to the north. The exact borders of the early Serbian state are unclear.

Although Višeslav is only mentioned by name, the DAI mentions that the Serbs served the Byzantine Emperor and that they were at this time at peace with the Bulgars, whose neighbors they were and with whom they shared a common frontier. The First Bulgarian Empire, under Telerig, planned to colonize some of their lands with more Slavs from the neighbouring Berziti, as the earlier Bulgar expansion had caused massive Slav migrations and depopulation of Bulgaria — in 762, more than 200,000 people fled to Byzantine territory and were relocated to Asia Minor. The Bulgars were defeated in 774, after Constantine V learned of their planned raid. In 783, a large Slavic uprising took place in the Byzantine Empire, stretching from Macedonia to the Peloponnese, which was subsequently quelled by Byzantine patrikios Staurakios.

Višeslav was succeeded by his son Radoslav, then grandson Prosigoj, and one of these two most likely ruled during the revolt of Ljudevit Posavski against the Franks (819–822); according to Einhard's Royal Frankish Annals, written in 822, Ljudevit went from his seat at Sisak to the Serbs, with Einhard mentioning that for the Serbs "is said to be holding a great part of Dalmatia" (ad Sorabos, quae natio magnam Dalmatiae partem obtinere dicitur). According to Živković, the usage of the term Dalmatia in the Royal Frankish Annals to refer both to the land where Serbs ruled as well as to the lands under the rule of Croat duke, was likely a reflection of the Franks' territorial aspirations towards the entire area of the former Roman Province of Dalmatia.Though the described borders mark a large area, it is mostly a mountainous and inaccessible terrain, rugged with the high ranges of the Dinarides. Within this region, the Serbs settled only a small, isolated and mutually distant river valleys, karst fields and fertile basins. Those patches of the territory had fertile land, suitable for the agriculture, while the barely accessible, some mountain regions remained uninhabited. Višeslav's great-grandson Vlastimir began his rule during 830s, and he is the oldest Serbian ruler on which there is more substantial data.

=== Countering Bulgarian expansion (805–829) ===
In the east, the Bulgarian empire grew strong. In 805 Krum conquered the Braničevci, Timočani and Obotrites, to the east of Serbia, and banished their tribal chiefs and replaced them with administrators appointed by the central government. In 815, the Bulgarians and Byzantines signed a 30-year peace treaty, but in 818, during the rule of Omurtag (814–836), the Braničevci and Timočani together with other tribes of the frontiers, revolted and seceded from Bulgaria because of an administrative reform that had deprived them much of their local authority. The Timočani left the society (association, alliance) of the Bulgarian state, and sought, together with the Danubian Obotrites and Guduscani, protection from Holy Roman Emperor Louis the Pious (r. 813–840), and met him at his court at Herstal. The Timočani migrated into Frankish territory, somewhere in Lower Pannonia, and were last mentioned in 819, when they were persuaded by Ljudevit to join him in fighting the Franks. The Danubian Obotrites stayed in Banat, and resisted the Bulgars until 824 when nothing more is heard of them. Krum sent envoys to the Franks and requested that the precise boundary be demarcated between them, and negotiations lasted until 826, when the Franks neglected him. The Bulgars answered by subjugating the Slavs that lived in Pannonia. Then the Bulgars sent ships up the Drava river, and, in 828, devastated Upper Pannonia north of the Drava. There was more fighting in 829 as well, and, by this time, the Bulgars had conquered all of their former Slavic allies.

The Bulgarian state had a general policy of expansion in which they would first impose the payment of tribute on a neighboring people and the obligation of supplying military assistance in the form of an alliance (society), leaving them internal self-government and local rulers, and when the need for this kind of relationship expired, they would terminate the self-government of the said people and impose their direct and absolute power, integrating them fully into the Bulgarian political and cultural system.

=== Vlastimir, Mutimir and Prvoslav (830–892) ===
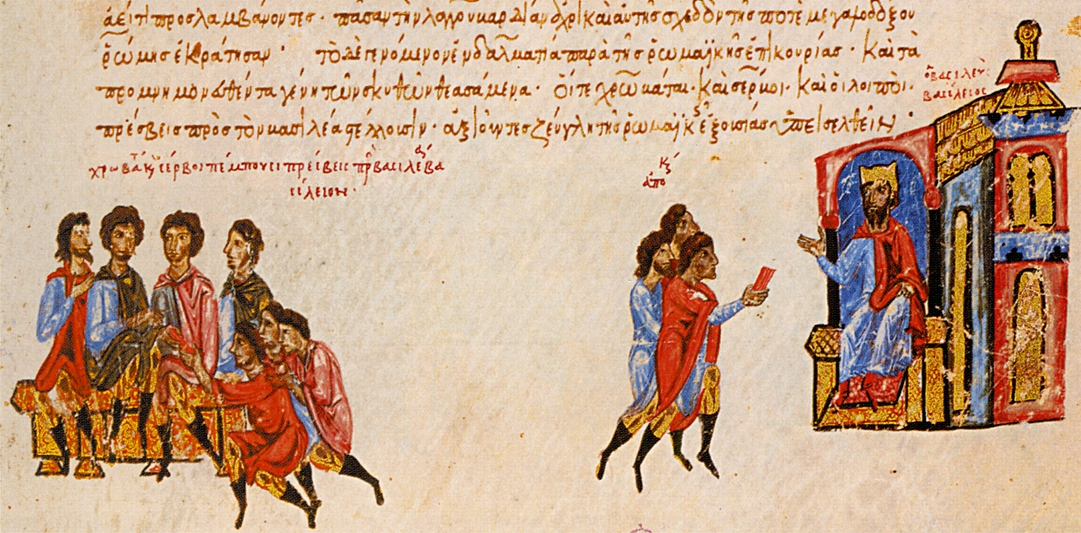
Emperor Basil I receiving delegations of Croats and Serbs

Vlastimir succeeded his father, Prosigoj, in c. 830. He united the Serbian tribes in the vicinity. The Serbs were alarmed, and most likely consolidated due to the spreading of the Bulgarian Empire towards their borders by the Bulgarian conquest of neighbouring Slavs, and possibly sought to cut off the Bulgar expansion to the south (Macedonia). Emperor Theophilos (r. 829–842) was recognized as the nominal suzerain (overlord) of the Serbs, and most likely encouraged them to thwart the Bulgars. The thirty-year-peace treaty between the Byzantines and Bulgars, signed in 815, was still in effect.

According to Constantine VII, the Serbs and Bulgars had lived peacefully as neighbours until the Bulgar invasion in 839 (in the last years of Theophilos). It is not known what exactly prompted the war, as Porphyrogenitus gives no clear answer; whether it was a result of Serbian-Bulgarian relations, i.e., the Bulgar conquest to the southeast, or a result of the Byzantine-Bulgarian rivalry, in which Serbia was allied with the Byzantines. According to Porphyrogenitus, the Bulgars wanted to continue their conquest of Slav lands and subjugate the Serbs. Presian I (r. 836–852) launched an invasion into Serbian territory in 839, which led to a war that lasted for three years, in which the victorious army of Vlastimir expelled Presian from Serbia; Presian lost a large number of his men, and made no territorial gains. The Serbs had an advantage in the forests and gorges. The defeat of the Bulgars, who had become one of the greater powers in the 9th century, shows that Serbia was an organized state, fully capable of defending its borders, and possessed a very high military and administrative organization. It is not known whether Serbia at the time of Vlastimir had a fortification system and developed military structures with clearly defined roles of the župan. After the victory over the Bulgars, Vlastimir's status rose, and according to Fine he went on to expand to the west, taking Bosnia, and Herzegovina (known as Hum). In the meantime; Braničevo, Morava, Timok, Vardar and Podrimlje were occupied by the Bulgars. Vlastimir married off his daughter to Krajina, the son of a local župan of Trebinje, Beloje, in ca. 847/848. With this marriage, Vlastimir elevated the title of Krajina to archon. The Belojević family was thus entitled to rule Travunia.

After Vlastimir's death, the rule was divided among his three sons: Mutimir, Strojimir and Gojnik. The brothers defeated the Bulgars once again c. 853-854, capturing Bulgarian prince Vladimir, son of Boris of Bulgaria. After that, Serbs and the Bulgarians concluded peace. During the following period, the Christianization of the Serbs was completed. Mutimir maintained the communion with the Eastern Church (Constantinople) when Pope John VIII invited him to recognize the jurisdiction of the bishopric of Sirmium.

The Serbs and Bulgarians adopted the Old Slavonic liturgy instead of the Greek. Sometime after defeating the Bulgarians, Mutimir ousted his brothers, who fled to Bulgaria. He kept Gopnik's son Petar Gojniković in his court, but he managed to escape to Croatia. Mutimir ruled until 890, being succeeded by his son Prvoslav. However, Prvoslav was overthrown by Petar who had returned from his exile in Croatia in c. 892.

=== Petar, Pavle and Zaharija (892–927) ===
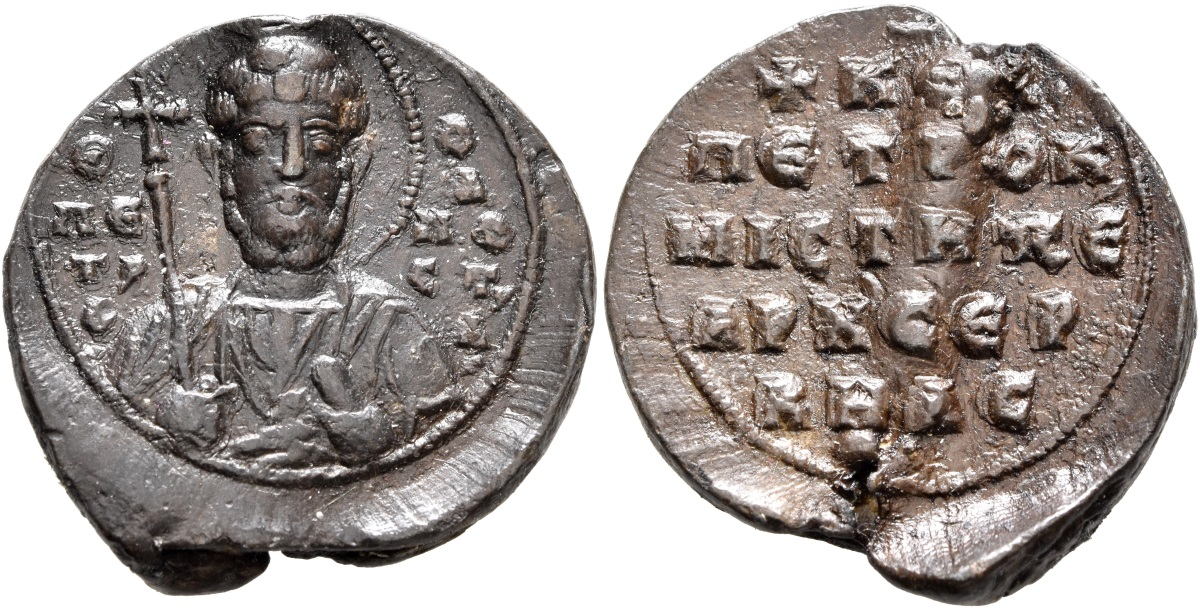
Seal of Petar with inscription +KÊ R, / ΠÊTPO K,/MICTH KÊ / ARX' CEPBHAC ('Lord, help Petros, caretaker and archon of Serbia'), 9th century

The name Peter suggests that Christianity had started to permeate into Serbia, undoubtedly through Serbia's contacts with the Bulgarians and Byzantines. Peter secured himself on the throne (after fending off a challenge from Klonimir, son of Stojmir) and was recognized by Tsar Symeon I of Bulgaria. An alliance was signed between the two states. Already having Travunia's loyalty, Peter began to expand his state north and west. He annexed the Bosna River valley, and then moved west securing allegiance from the Narentines, a fiercely independent, pirateering Slavic tribe. However, Peter's expansion into Dalmatia brought him into conflict with Prince Michael of Zahumlje, who has also grown powerful, ruling the coastal Principality of Zachlumia.

Although allied to Simeon I of Bulgaria, Peter became increasingly disgruntled by the fact that he was essentially subordinate to him. Peter's expansion toward the coast facilitated contacts with the Byzantines, by way of the strategies of Dyrrhachium. Searching for allies against Bulgaria, the Byzantines showered Peter with gold and promises of greater independence if he would join their alliance - a convincing strategy. Peter might have been planning an attack on Bulgaria with the Magyars, showing that his realm had stretched north to the Sava river. However, Michael of Zahumlje forewarned Symeon of this plan, since Michael was an enemy of Peter, and a loyal vassal of Symeon. What followed was multiple Bulgarian interventions and a succession of Serb rulers.

Symeon attacked Serbia (in 917) and deposed Peter, placing Pavle Branović (a grandson of Mutimir) as Prince of Serbia, subordinate to Symeon (although some scholars suggest that Symeon took control over Serbia directly at this time). Unhappy with this, the Byzantines then sent Zaharija Prvoslavljević in 920 to oust Pavle, but he failed and was sent to Bulgaria as prisoner. The Byzantines then succeeded in turning Prince Pavle to their side. In turn, Zaharija invaded Serbia with a Bulgarian force, and ousted his cousin Pavle in 922. However, he too turned to Byzantium. A punitive force sent by the Bulgarians was defeated. Thus we see a continuous cycle of dynastic strife amongst Vlastimir's successors, stirred on by the Byzantine and Bulgarians, who were effectively using the Serbs as pawns. Whilst Bulgarian help was more effective, Byzantine help seemed preferable. Simeon made peace with the Byzantines to settle affairs with Serbia once and for all. In 924, he sent a large army accompanied by Časlav, son of Klonimir. The army forced Zaharija to flee to Croatia. The Serbian župans were then summoned to recognize Časlav as the new Prince. When they came, however, they were all imprisoned and taken to Bulgaria, as too was Časlav. Much of Serbia was ravaged, and many people fled to Croatia, Bulgaria and Constantinople. Simeon made Serbia into a Bulgarian province so that Bulgaria now bordered Croatia and Zahumlje. He then resolved to attack Croatia, because it was a Byzantine ally and had sheltered the Serbian Prince.

=== Časlav (933–943/960) ===
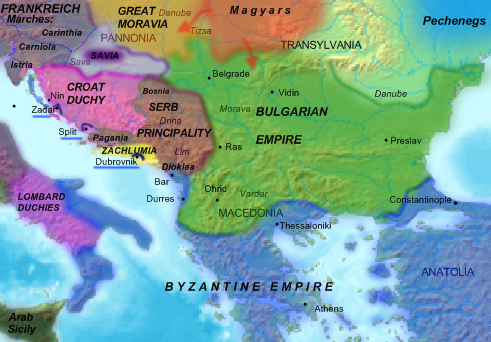
Serbia during the rule of Časlav

The Bulgarian rule over Serbia lasted only nine years. After Symeon died, Časlav Klonimirović (933- c. 943/960) led Serb refugees back to Serbia. He secured the allegiance of the Dalmatian duchies and ended Bulgarian rule in central Serbia. After Tomislav's death, Croatia was in near-anarchy as his sons vied for sole rule, so Časlav was able to extend his domain north to the Vrbas river (gaining the allegiance of the chiefs of the various Bosnian župas).

During this apogee of Serbian power, Christianity and culture penetrated Serbia, as the Serb prince lived in peaceful and cordial relations with the Byzantines. However, strong as it had grown to be, Serbia's power (as in other early Slavic states) was only as strong as its ruler. There was no centralized rule, but instead a confederacy of Slavic principalities. The existence of the unified Grand Principality was dependent on the allegiance of the lesser princes to Časlav. When he died defending Bosnia against Magyar incursions sometime between 950 and 960, the coalition disintegrated.

After this, there is a gap in the history of hinterland Serbia (in later western sources, since the second half of the 12th century, also known as: Rascia), as it was annexed by the Byzantine Empire (c. 970). The dynasty continued to rule the maritime regions, and in the 990s, Jovan Vladimir rose as the most powerful Serbian prince, ruling over present-day Montenegro, eastern Herzegovina, and northern Albania. This state became known as Duklja, after the ancient Roman town of Doclea. However, by 997, it was made subject to tsar Samuel of Bulgaria.

When the Byzantines finally defeated the Bulgarians, they regained control over most of the Balkans for the first time in four centuries. Serbian lands were governed by strategoi presiding over the thema of Serbia and Sirmium. However, local Slavic rulers maintained local autonomy over their lands, while only nominally being Byzantine subjects. Forts were maintained in Belgrade, Sirmium, Niš and Braničevo. These were, for the most part, in the hands of local nobility, which often revolted against Byzantine rule.

=== Aftermath ===
The principality was annexed by the Byzantine Empire in c. 969–971 and reorganized as the Catepanate of Ras. Serbia lost its centralized rule and the lands once again came under the Empire. Jovan Vladimir emerged later as a ruler of Duklja, a small territory centered in Bar on the Adriatic coast, as a Byzantine vassal. His realm was called Serbia, Dalmatia, Sklavonia, etc., and eventually included much of the maritime provinces, including Travunia and Zachlumia. His realm probably stretched into the hinterland to include some parts of Zagorje (inland Serbia and Bosnia) as well. Vladimir's pre-eminent position over other Slavic nobles in the area explains why Emperor Basil approached him for an anti-Bulgarian alliance. With his hands tied by war in Anatolia, Emperor Basil required allies for his war against Tsar Samuel, who ruled a Bulgarian empire stretching over Macedonia. In retaliation, Samuel invaded Duklja in 997, and pushed through Dalmatia up to the city of Zadar, incorporating Bosnia and Serbia into his realm. After defeating Vladimir, Samuel reinstated him as a vassal prince. We do not know what Vladimir's connection was to the previous princes of Serbia, or to the rulers of Croatia—much of what is written in the Chronicle of the Priest of Duklja about the genealogy of the Doclean rulers is mythological. Vladimir was murdered by Vladislav, Samuel's nephew and successor of his son, circa 1016 AD. The last prominent member of his family, his uncle Dragimir, was killed by some local citizens in Kotor in 1018. That same year, the Byzantines defeated the Bulgarians, and in one masterful stroke re-took virtually all of southeastern Europe.

== Geography ==
The DAI enumerates kastra oikoumena ("inhabited cities") of "baptized Serbia": Drstnik, Crnovrški, Međurečje, Drežnik, Lešnik, Sol, and in the area of Bosnia, Kotor and Desnik. The first city, Destinikon/Dostinika (Greek: Δεστινίκον/Δοστινίκα) in original Greek, is identified as Drsnik in Hvosno, later mentioned (Дрьстьникь) by Stefan Nemanjić, and which has remains of an early medieval fortification. The second, Tzernavouskei (Τζερναβουσκέη), is *Črьnov(r)ь(šь)skь in Slavic, that is Crni Vrh ("black peak") which is widespread in Serbia as a site with fortification, and perhaps is the župa of Crna Stena in the Prijepolje area. Megyretous (Μεγυρέτους) is Slavic međurečje ("between rivers") and signifies a city at the confluence of two rivers, perhaps Piva and Tara, where the later Soko fortress was founded, or somewhere else in the Drina zemlja. Dresneik (Δρεσνεήκ; Slavic *Drěžьnikъ) and Lesnik (Λεσνήκ; Slavic *Lěš(čь)nikъ) are common toponyms and their location is therefore hard to determine. S. Mišić (2014) connects Lesnik to Lešnica in Jadar or below Vidojevica, and Dresneik to Drežnik in the Užice area or Pljevlja area. Salines (Σαλινές) is medieval Sol, modern-day Tuzla. The DAI is the oldest mention of Bosnia (εἰς τὸ χωρίον Βόσονα), and the Bosnia region was part of Serbia also prior to its mention in DAI. There is no mention of an archon of Bosnia in De Ceremoniis. The claim by some Croatian and Bosnian historians that Bosnia was part of Croatia is not based on any historical source. The Bosnia mentioned at the time did not include all Serbian territory to the west of the Drina, because Sol, likely with the wider area of later Usora and Soli between Drina, Sava and Vrbas, did not belong to it. The Bosnia mentioned in DAI included the upper and middle course of the eponymous Bosna river. The Drina was certainly the border between Serbia and Bosnia by the late 13th century, but it was not the border prior to this, and LPD's division of Serbia into Raška and Bosnia dates from this period. Katera (τὸ Κάτερα; Slavic Kotorъ) could be identified as Kotorac overlooking the Sarajevo field, while Desnik (Δεσνήκ; Slavic *těsnikъ) could be the later Sutjeska.

Serbia proper bordered in the northwest with Croatia towards Cetina and Livno, and Imotski and Pliva are mentioned as župe part of Croatia, meaning Serbia included the Vrbas valley in the west. Towards the Adriatic sea, the Dalmatian principalities, from northwest-southeast direction, were Narentines (between Cetina and Neretva), Zahumlje (from Neretva to Dubrovnik), Travunija (from Dubrovnik to Kotor), and Duklja (from Kotor towards Dyrrachion), which all bordered Serbia proper in the mountains. In the north, based on the Magyar territory, Časlav's conflict, and Salines (Tuzla) explicitly included in Serbia, the territory stretched to the Sava and towards the Danube. In the east, Serbia bordered with Bulgaria and the Ras fortress was described as a frontier in DAI. The eastern frontier stretched over the Ibar valley, crossed West Morava and through the Kolubara valley approached the Sava river. The DAI mentions Travunija as "always under the rule of the archon of Serbia". Zahumlje and Travunija are both called horion, and not hora as Serbia and Croatia.

At the time of the DAI, the political organization was not determined on territory, but on people (gens or "tribe"). The DAI usually used the title "archon of Serbia" (ὁ ἄρχων Σερβλίας), while De Ceremoniis (946) used "archon of Serbs" (εἰς τὸν ἄρχοντα Σέρβλων); these were likely synonyms. The capital according to T. Živković was likely Destinikon, which was temporarily held by Časlav's father Klonimir during his attempt to oust Petar.

== Government ==
The Serbian rulers of the Vlastimirović dynasty were titled "archon of Serbia" (Greek: αρχων Σερβλίας) according to De Administrando Imperio (960). The title of archon (ἄρχων, plural ἄρχοντες, archontes) was used by the Byzantines as a generic title for "prince, ruler". It was used for the rulers of South Slavic polities as well as the Rus' and Bulgars. In Serbian historiography, the Slavic title of knez (кнез) is generally used instead of the Greek-derived arhont (архонт). The title of župan is known in sources from the 8th century and was used throughout Slavic territory. In the beginning, the župan was the representative of tribal leadership, and Byzantine sources speak of "elder župans". With the establishment of Serbian states in the Early Middle Ages, there was the ruler (knez or archon) as supreme leader, and several župan across the country, who held limited authority and territory (župa). The DAI mentions that the Serbian throne is inherited by the son, i.e. the first-born; his descendants succeeded him, though their names are unknown until the coming of Višeslav. The Serbs at that time were organized into župe (sing. župa), a confederation of village communities (roughly the equivalent of a county), headed by a local župan (a magistrate or governor); the governorship was hereditary, and the župan reported to the Serbian prince, whom they were obliged to aid in war.

Historian B. Radojković (1958) proposed that Serbia was a "divided principality". According to him, Višeslav could have been a chief military leader (veliki vojvoda) who with his company seized the entire power in his hands and turned himself into a hereditary ruler, as Veliki župan; in this way, the first Serbian state was thus established after 150 years of permanent living in the new homeland and existence of military democracy. However, B. Radojković's work was discredited by Sima Ćirković in 1960.

== Religion ==
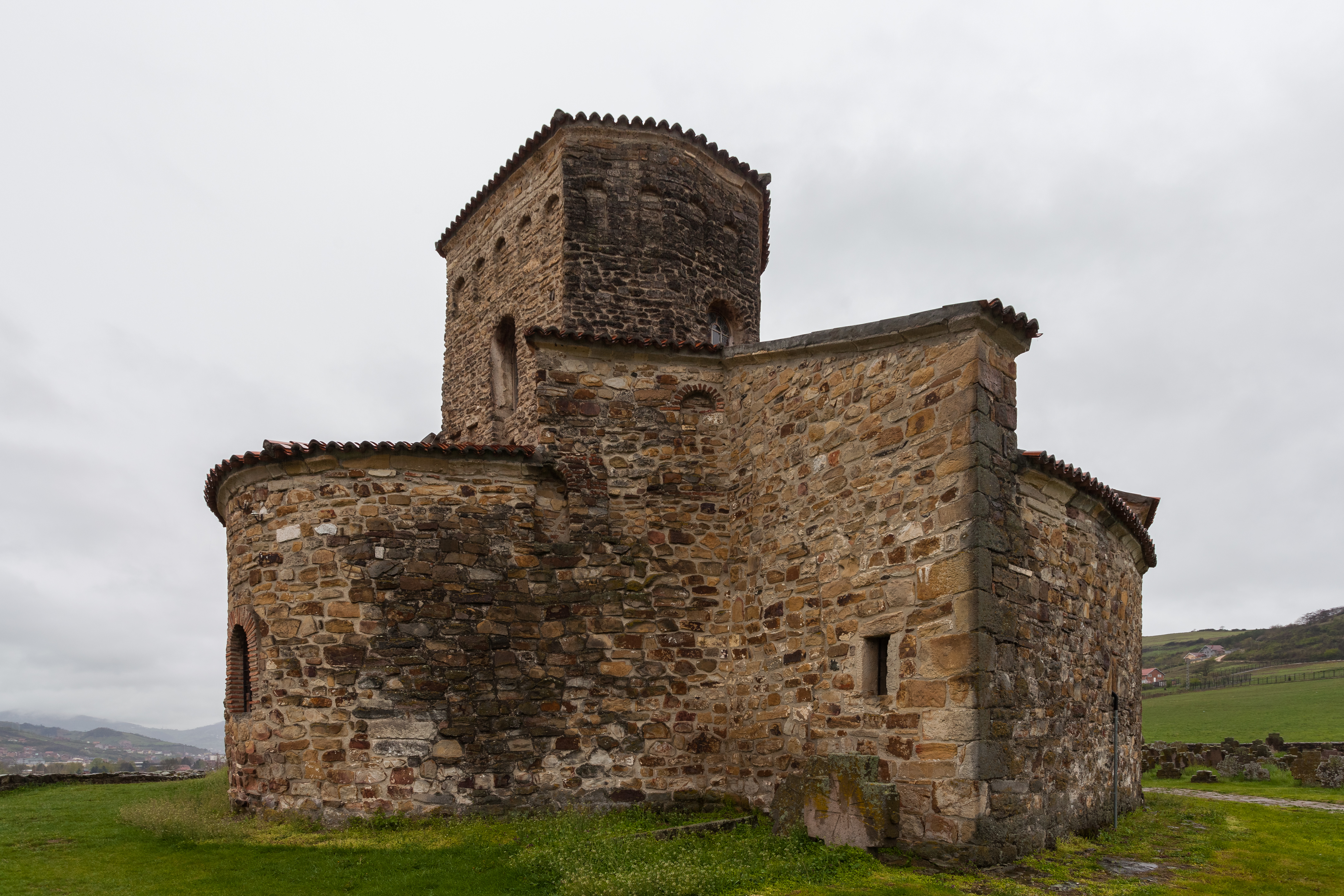
Church of the Holy Apostles Peter and Paul, 9th century

By the beginning of the 7th century, Byzantine provincial and ecclesiastical order in the region was destroyed by invading Sclaveni and Pannonian Avars. The church life was renewed in the same century in the province of Illyricum and Dalmatia after a more pronounced Christianization of the Serbs and other Slavs by the Roman Church. In the 7th and mid-8th century the area wasn't under jurisdiction of the Patriarchate of Constantinople.

Early medieval Serbs are accounted as Christians by 870s, but it was a process that ended in the late 9th century during the time of Basil I, and medieval necropolises until the 13th century in the territory of modern Serbia show an "incomplete process of Christianization" as local Christianity depended on the social structure (urban and rural). Basil I probably sent at least one embassy to Mutimir of Serbia, who decided to maintain the communion of Church in Serbia with the Patriarchate of Constantinople when Pope John VIII invited him to get back to the jurisdiction of the bishopric of Sirmium (see also Archbishopric of Moravia) in a letter dated to May 873. It is considered that Destinikon was an ecclesiastical centre and capital of early medieval Serbia.

The seal of Strojimir (d. between 880 and 896), the brother of Mutimir, was bought by the Serbian state in an auction in Germany. The seal has a Patriarchal cross in the center and Greek inscriptions that say: "God, help Strojimir (CTPOHMIP)".

Petar Gojniković (r. 892–917) was evidently a Christian prince (as his name shows), and Christianity presumably was spreading in his time. Also, since Serbia bordered Bulgaria, Christian influence—and perhaps missionaries—came from there. This would increase during the twenty-year peace. The previous generation (Mutimir, Strojimir and Gojnik) had Slav names, but the following (Petar, Stefan, Pavle, Zaharija) had Christian names, an indication of strong Byzantine missions to Serbia, as well as to the Slavs of the Adriatic coast, in the 870s.

The imperial charter of Basil II from 1020 to the Archbishopric of Ohrid, in which the rights and jurisdictions were established, mentions that the Episcopy of Ras belonged to the Bulgarian autocephal church during the time of Peter I (927–969) and Samuel of Bulgaria (977–1014). It is considered that it was possibly founded by the Bulgarian emperor, or it is the latest date when could have been integrated to the Bulgarian Church. If previously existed, it probably was part of the Bulgarian metropolis of Morava, but certainly not of Durrës. If it was on the Serbian territory, seems that the Church in Serbia or part of the territory of Serbia became linked and influenced by the Bulgarian Church between 870 and 924. Anyway, the church would have been protected by Bulgarian controlled forts. By then, at the latest, Serbia must have received the Cyrillic alphabet and Slavic religious text, already familiar but perhaps not yet preferred to Greek.

Notable early church buildings include the Monastery of Holy Archangel Michael on Prevlaka, built in the beginning of the 9th century, on the location of older churches of three-nave structure with three apses to the East, dating from the 3rd and 6th centuries, Bogorodica Hvostanska (6th century) and Church of Saints Peter and Paul.

== Archaeological sites ==
- Church of the Holy Apostles Peter and Paul, Stari Ras
- Gradina on Postenje, Stari Ras
- Sočanica Basilica near Leposavić
- Gradina, Sebečevska reka, Raška
- Gradina Martinića, near Podgorica
- Gradina on Brsenica, near Sjenica
- Gradina on Jelica, near Čačak

== See also ==
- Serbia in the Middle Ages
- Bulgarian–Serbian wars

== Sources ==
- Moravcsik, Gyula, ed. (1967) [1949]. Constantine Porphyrogenitus: De Administrando Imperio (2nd revised ed.). Washington D.C.: Dumbarton Oaks Center for Byzantine Studies. ISBN 9780884020219.
- Nesbitt, John; Oikonomides, Nicolas, eds. (1991). Catalogue of Byzantine Seals at Dumbarton Oaks and in the Fogg Museum of Art, Volume 1: Italy, North of the Balkans, North of the Black Sea. Vol. 1. Washington, DC: Dumbarton Oaks Research Library and Collection. ISBN 0-88402-194-7.
- Blagojević, Miloš (2001). Државна управа у српским средњовековним земљама [State administration in the Serb medieval lands] (Second ed.). Službeni list SRJ. ISBN 9788635504971.
- Bulić, Dejan (2013). "The Fortifications of the Late Antiquity and the Early Byzantine Period on the Later Territory of the South-Slavic Principalities, and their re-occupation". The World of the Slavs: Studies of the East, West and South Slavs: Civitas, Oppidas, Villas and Archeological Evidence (7th to 11th Centuries AD). Belgrade: The Institute for History. pp. 137–234. ISBN 9788677431044.
- Bury, John B. (1912). A History of the Eastern Empire from the Fall of Irene to the Accession of Basil I. (A.D. 802-867). London: Macmillan.
- Ćirković, Sima (2004). The Serbs. Malden: Blackwell Publishing. ISBN 9781405142915.
- Curta, Florin (2001). The Making of the Slavs: History and Archaeology of the Lower Danube Region, c. 500–700. Cambridge: Cambridge University Press. ISBN 9781139428880.
- Fine, John V. A. Jr. (1991) [1983]. The Early Medieval Balkans: A Critical Survey from the Sixth to the Late Twelfth Century. Ann Arbor: University of Michigan Press. ISBN 0-472-08149-7.
- Heather, Peter (2010). Empires and Barbarians: The Fall of Rome and the Birth of Europe. Oxford University Press. ISBN 978-0-19-974163-2.
- Ivanišević, Vujadin; Krsmanović, Bojana (2013). "Byzantine Seals from the Ras Fortress" (PDF). Зборник радова Византолошког института. 50 (1): 449–460.
- Janković, Đorđe (2004). "The Slavs in the 6th Century North Illyricum". Гласник Српског археолошког друштва. 20: 39–61.
- Janković, Đorđe (2007). Српско Поморје од 7. до 10. столећа (Serbian Maritime from 7th to 10th Century) (PDF). Београд: Српско археолошко друштво.
- Janković, Đorđe (2012). "О проучавању и публиковању утврђених места у Србији из VII-X столећа". Гласник Српског археолошког друштва. 28: 313–334.
- Kaimakamova, Miliana; Salamon, Maciej (2007). Byzantium, new peoples, new powers: the Byzantino-Slav contact zone, from the ninth to the fifteenth century. Towarzystwo Wydawnicze "Historia Iagellonica". ISBN 978-83-88737-83-1 – via Archive.org.
- Kalić, Jovanka (1995). "Rascia – The Nucleus of the Medieval Serbian State". The Serbian Question in the Balkans. Belgrade: Faculty of Geography. pp. 147–155.
- Komatina, Ivana (2016). Црква и држава у српским земљама од XI до XIII века [Church and State in the Serbian Lands from the XIth to the XIIIth Century]. Београд: Institute of History. ISBN 9788677431136.
- Komatina, Predrag (2010). "The Slavs of the mid-Danube basin and the Bulgarian expansion in the first half of the 9th century" (PDF). Зборник радова Византолошког института. 47: 55–82.
- Komatina, Predrag (2014). "Settlement of the Slavs in Asia Minor During the Rule of Justinian II and the Bishopric των Γορδοσερβων" (PDF). Београдски историјски гласник: Belgrade Historical Review. 5: 33–42.
- Komatina, Predrag (2015). "The Church in Serbia at the Time of Cyrilo-Methodian Mission in Moravia". Cyril and Methodius: Byzantium and the World of the Slavs. Thessaloniki: Dimos. pp. 711–718 – via Academia.edu.
- Komatina, Predrag (2021). Константин Порфирогенит и рана историја Јужних Словена [Constantine Porphyrogenitus and the Early History of South Slavs]. Византолошки институт, Београд. ISBN 978-86-83883-28-8.
- Komatina, Predrag (2025). Church Policy of Byzantium after the Triumph of Orthodoxy (843-886). Cham: Springer Nature.
- Krsmanović, Bojana (2008). The Byzantine Province in Change: On the Threshold Between the 10th and the 11th Century. Belgrade: Institute for Byzantine Studies. ISBN 9789603710608.
- Kunčer, Dragana (2009). Gesta Regum Sclavorum. Vol. 1. Београд-Никшић: Историјски институт, Манастир Острог.
- Mišić, Siniša (2014). Историјска географија српских земаља: од 6. до половине 16. века. Магелан Прес. ISBN 978-86-88873-17-8.
- Mrgić-Radojčić, Jelena (2004). "Rethinking the Territorial Development of the Medieval Bosnian State". Историјски часопис. 51: 43–64.
- Novaković, Bojan (2016). "Zemlje Dalmatinskih slovena". In Rudić, Srđan (ed.). Spomenica dr Tibora Živkovića [Homage to Tibor Živković]. Istorijski institut. pp. 129-. ISBN 978-86-7743-117-4.
- Novaković, Relja (1981). Gde se nalazila Srbija od VII do XII veka. Narodna knjiga i Istorijski institut. Google Books
- Petrović, Vladeta (2013). "Terrestrial Communications in the Late Antiquity and the Early Middle Ages in the Western Part of the Balkan Peninsula". The World of the Slavs: Studies of the East, West and South Slavs: Civitas, Oppidas, Villas and Archeological Evidence (7th to 11th Centuries AD). Belgrade: The Institute for History. pp. 235–287. ISBN 9788677431044.
- Popović, Marko (1999). Tvrđava Ras [The Fortress of Ras] (in Serbian). Belgrade: Archaeological Institute. ISBN 9788680093147.
- Runciman, Steven (1930). A History of the First Bulgarian Empire. London: G. Bell & Sons.
- Samardžić, Radovan; Duškov, Milan, eds. (1993). Serbs in European Civilization. Belgrade: Nova, Serbian Academy of Sciences and Arts, Institute for Balkan Studies. ISBN 9788675830153.
- Šarkić, Srđan (2012). "Владарске титуле у средњовековној Србији" [Monarch's titles in Mediaeval Serbia] (PDF). Зборник радова Правног факултета у Новом Саду. 46 (2): 23–35.
- Špehar, Perica N. (2010). "By Their Fruit you will recognize them - Christianization of Serbia in Middle Ages". Tak więc po owocach poznacie ich. Poznań: Stowarzyszenie naukowe archeologów Polskich. pp. 203–220.
- Špehar, Perica N. (2015a). "Remarks to Christianisation and Realms in the Central Balkans in the Light of Archaeological Finds (7th-11th c.)". Castellum, Civitas, Urbs: Centres and Elites in Early Medieval East-Central Europe. Budapest: Verlag Marie Leidorf. pp. 71–93.
- Špehar, Perica N. (2015b). "(Dis)continuity of the Life in Late Antique Danubian Fortresses in Early Middle Ages: From Belgrade to the Confluence of the Timok River". Archaeology of the First Millennium A.D. Vol. 4. Brăila: Istros. pp. 329–350.
- Špehar, Perica N. (2019). "Reocupation of the Late Antique Fortifications on the central Balkans during the Early Middle Ages". Fortifications, Defence Systems, Structures, and Features in the Past. Zagreb: Institute of Archaeology. pp. 113–124.
- Treadgold, Warren (1997). A History of the Byzantine State and Society. Stanford, California: Stanford University Press. ISBN 0-8047-2630-2.
- Uzelac, Aleksandar B. (2018). "Prince Michael of Zahumlje – a Serbian ally of Tsar Simeon". Emperor Symeon's Bulgaria in the History of Europe's South-East: 1100 years from the Battle of Achelous. Sofia: St Kliment Ohridski University Press. pp. 236–245.
- Vlasto, Alexis P. (1970). The Entry of the Slavs into Christendom: An Introduction to the Medieval History of the Slavs. Cambridge: Cambridge University Press. ISBN 9780521074599.
- Whittow, Mark (1996). The Making of Orthodox Byzantium, 600–1025. Basingstoke: Macmillan. ISBN 9781349247653.
- Živković, Tibor (2006). Портрети српских владара: IX-XII век [Portraits of Serbian Rulers: IX-XII century]. Завод за уџбенике и наставна средства, Београд. ISBN 9788617137548.
- Živković, Tibor (2007). "The Golden Seal of Stroimir" (PDF). Historical Review. 55. Belgrade: The Institute for History: 23–29. Archived from the original (PDF) on 24 March 2018.
- Živković, Tibor (2008a). Forging unity: The South Slavs between East and West 550-1150. Belgrade: The Institute of History, Čigoja štampa. ISBN 978-86-7558-573-2.
- Živković, Tibor (2008b). "Constantine Porphyrogenitus' Kastra oikoumena in the Southern Slavs Principalities" (PDF). Историјски часопис. 57: 9–28.
- Živković, Tibor (2009). Gesta Regum Sclavorum. Vol. 2. Београд-Никшић: Историјски институт, Манастир Острог.
- Živković, Tibor (2010a). "Constantine Porphyrogenitus' Source on the Earliest History of the Croats and Serbs". Radovi Zavoda Za Hrvatsku Povijest U Zagrebu. 42: 117–131.
- Živković, Tibor (2010b). "On the Beginnings of Bosnia in the Middle Ages". Spomenica akademika Marka Šunjića (1927-1998). Sarajevo: Filozofski fakultet. pp. 161–180.
- Živković, Tibor (2011). "The Origin of the Royal Frankish Annalist's Information about the Serbs in Dalmatia". Homage to Academician Sima Ćirković. Belgrade: The Institute for History. pp. 381–398. ISBN 9788677430917.
- Živković, Tibor (2012). De conversione Croatorum et Serborum: A Lost Source. Belgrade: The Institute of History.
- Živković, Tibor (2013a). "On the Baptism of the Serbs and Croats in the Time of Basil I (867–886)" (PDF). Studia Slavica et Balcanica Petropolitana (1): 33–53.
