= Bulgar–Serb War (839–842) =

9th-century conflict between the First Bulgarian Empire and the Serbian Principality

Bulgar–Serb War (839–42)
- Part of the Bulgarian–Serbian wars (medieval)
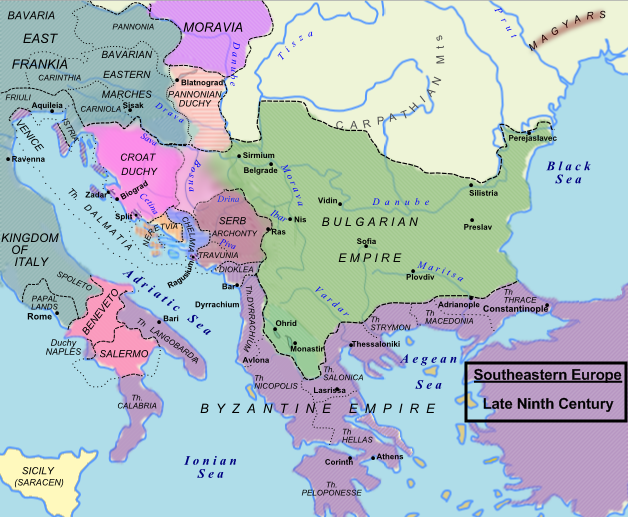
- Bulgarian Empire, Serbian principalities and the Balkans in the 9th century
Date	839–842
Location	Central Balkans
Result	Serbian victory

Belligerents
First Bulgarian Empire	Principality of Serbia

Commanders and leaders
Presian I	Vlastimir

The Bulgarian–Serbian War of 839–842 was a conflict between the First Bulgarian Empire and the Serbian Principality. It was one of the earliest recorded conflicts between the two states and marked the beginning of a series of Bulgarian–Serbian wars.

The war began after Presian I of Bulgaria invaded Serbia during the reign of the Serbian ruler Vlastimir. The Serbian forces successfully resisted the invasion, and the conflict ended without the incorporation of Serbia into the Bulgarian Empire.

== Prelude ==
According to De Administrando Imperio, the Serbs and Bulgars had lived peacefully as neighbours until the Bulgarian invasion in 839 (in the last years of emperor Theophilos). It is not known what exactly prompted the war, as Porphyrogenitus gives no clear answer; whether it was a result of Serbian–Bulgarian relations, i.e. the Bulgarian conquest to the southeast, or a result of the Byzantine-Bulgarian rivalry, in which Serbia was at the side of the Byzantines as an Imperial ally. It was not unlikely that the Emperor had a part in it; as he was in war with the Arabs, he may have pushed the Serbs to drive the Bulgars from western Macedonia, which would benefit them both. According to J. B. Bury, this alliance would explain the cause of the Bulgarian action. Vasil Zlatarski supposes that the Emperor offered the Serbs complete independence in return.

== War ==
According to Porphyrogenitus, the Bulgars wanted to continue their conquest of the Slavic lands and to force the Serbs into subjugation. Khan Presian (r. 836–852) launched an invasion into Serbian territory in 839, which led to a war that lasted for three years, in which the Serbs were victorious. The Bulgarian army was heavily defeated and lost many men. Presian made no territorial gains and was driven out by the army of Vlastimir. The Serbs held out in their hardly accessible forests and gorges, and knew how to fight in the hills. The war ended with the death of Theophilos in 842, which released Vlastimir from his obligations to the Byzantine Empire.

According to Tibor Živković, it is possible that the Bulgarian attack came after the failed invasion of Struma and Nestos valley in 846: Presian may have collected his army and headed for Serbia, and Vlastimir may have participated in the Byzantine–Bulgarian Wars, which would mean that Presian answered to a direct Serbian involvement.

The defeat of the Bulgars, who had become one of the greater powers in the 9th century showed that Serbia was an organized state, fully capable of defending its borders; a very high military and administrative organizational frame to present such effective resistance.

== Aftermath ==
Soon after 846, with the end of the 30–year–peace established by the Byzantine–Bulgarian Treaty of 815, Presian and his first minister Isbul invaded the regions of the Struma and the Nestos, and empress–regent Theodora (r. 842–855, the wife of Theophilos) answered by attacking Thracian Bulgaria. A brief peace was concluded, then Presian proceeded to invade Macedonia and eventually most of the region, including the city of Philippi, were incorporated in Bulgaria. The Bulgarians also imposed rule on the Morava region, the frontier region between Serbia and the Bulgarian Khanate.

== See also ==
- Bulgarian–Serbian medieval wars
- Bulgar-Serb War (853)
- Medieval Bulgarian Army
- Medieval Serbian Army

== Sources ==
Primary sources

- Moravcsik, Gyula, ed. (1967) [1949]. Constantine Porphyrogenitus: De Administrando Imperio (2nd revised ed.). Washington D.C.: Dumbarton Oaks Center for Byzantine Studies. ISBN 9780884020219.

Secondary sources

- Андреев (Andreev), Йордан (Jordan); Лалков (Lalkov), Милчо (Milcho) (1996). Българските ханове и царе (The Bulgarian Khans and Tsars) (in Bulgarian). Велико Търново (Veliko Tarnovo): Абагар (Abagar). ISBN 954-427-216-X.
- Bury, John B. (2008) [1912]. History of the Eastern Empire from the Fall of Irene to the Accession of Basil: A.D. 802-867. New York: Cosimo. ISBN 978-1-60520-421-5.
- Ćirković, Sima (2004). The Serbs. Malden: Blackwell Publishing. ISBN 9781405142915.
- Ćorović, Vladimir (2001). Istorija srpskog naroda (Internet ed.). Belgrade: Ars Libri.
- Curta, Florin (2006). Southeastern Europe in the Middle Ages, 500–1250. Cambridge: Cambridge University Press.
- Fine, John Van Antwerp Jr. (1991) [1983]. The Early Medieval Balkans: A Critical Survey from the Sixth to the Late Twelfth Century. Ann Arbor, Michigan: University of Michigan Press. ISBN 0-472-08149-7.
- Houtsma, M. Th. (1993). E.J. Brill's first encyclopaedia of Islam 1913–1936. BRILL. ISBN 90-04-08265-4.
- Runciman, Steven (1930). A history of the First Bulgarian Empire. London: G. Bell & Sons. Archived from the original on 2013-07-09.
- Živković, Tibor (2006). Portreti srpskih vladara (IX—XII vek). Belgrade. pp. 11–20. ISBN 86-17-13754-1.
- Zlatarski, Vasil (1918). История на Първото българско Царство. I. Епоха на хуно-българското надмощие (679—852) (in Bulgarian) (Internet ed.). Sofia.
