= Alexis P. Vlasto =

British historian and philologist

Alexis Vlasto
- Born: Alexis Peter Vlasto; 27 November 1915 (14 November 1915 on the Greek Orthodox ecclesiastical calendar of the time); Toxteth Park, Liverpool, England
- Died: 20 July 2000 (aged 84); Cambridge, England
- Education: King's College, Cambridge; Bletchley Park
- Occupations: Professor of Slavonic studies Codebreaker
- Spouse: Hilda Joan "Jill" Medway (1916–1968)
- Children: 2
- Parent(s): Peter Theodore Vlasto (1879–1941); Aziza Katherine Pallis (1884–1986)

Alexis Peter Vlasto (27 November 1915 [14 November 1915 on the Greek Orthodox ecclesiastical calendar of the time] – 20 July 2000) was a British historian and philologist, specialising in Slavonic studies.

== Life ==
Alexis Peter Vlasto was born at Toxteth Park, at that time a prosperous quarter in Liverpool, a major port city in northwest England. He was the younger of the two recorded children (and the only son) of Peter Theodore Vlasto (1879–1941) by his marriage to Aziza Katherine Pallis. The Liverpool-based Vlastos at this time are described as a "family of Greek shipping agents". Vlasto attended Eton College, a prestigious English "public school" where he enjoyed the status of a "King's Scholar", before progressing in 1937 to King's College, Cambridge, where he studied modern and medieval languages.

As the veil of secrecy lifted, it became known that in 1939 Vlasto was one of those headhunted to work at the British code breaking establishment at Bletchley in central England. Given charge of the Japanese Army Air Force section, tasks included cracking the Japanese Army Air Force code system 3366. Others assigned to the challenge included Maurice Wiles and Mervyn Jones. Someone else with whom he renewed an acquaintance at Bletchley Park was the young musicologist, Hilda Joan "Jill" Medway, like him seconded from Cambridge University to undertake "war work". War ended in May 1945: Vlasto and Medway had already married, on 19 March 1945.

By the end of 1945 they were back in Cambridge, where Jill Vlasto resumed her teaching role, directing studies in music at both the "recognised institutions for the higher education for women" (after 1948 women's colleges). Alexis accepted a research fellowship at his old college and pursued his studies, working towards a doctorate. Their home was large enough to accommodate a lodger. The harpsichordist Thurston Dart, like Jill Vlasto a pioneer champion of the "early music revival", lodged with the Vlastos on the western fringes of the city during 1949/50.

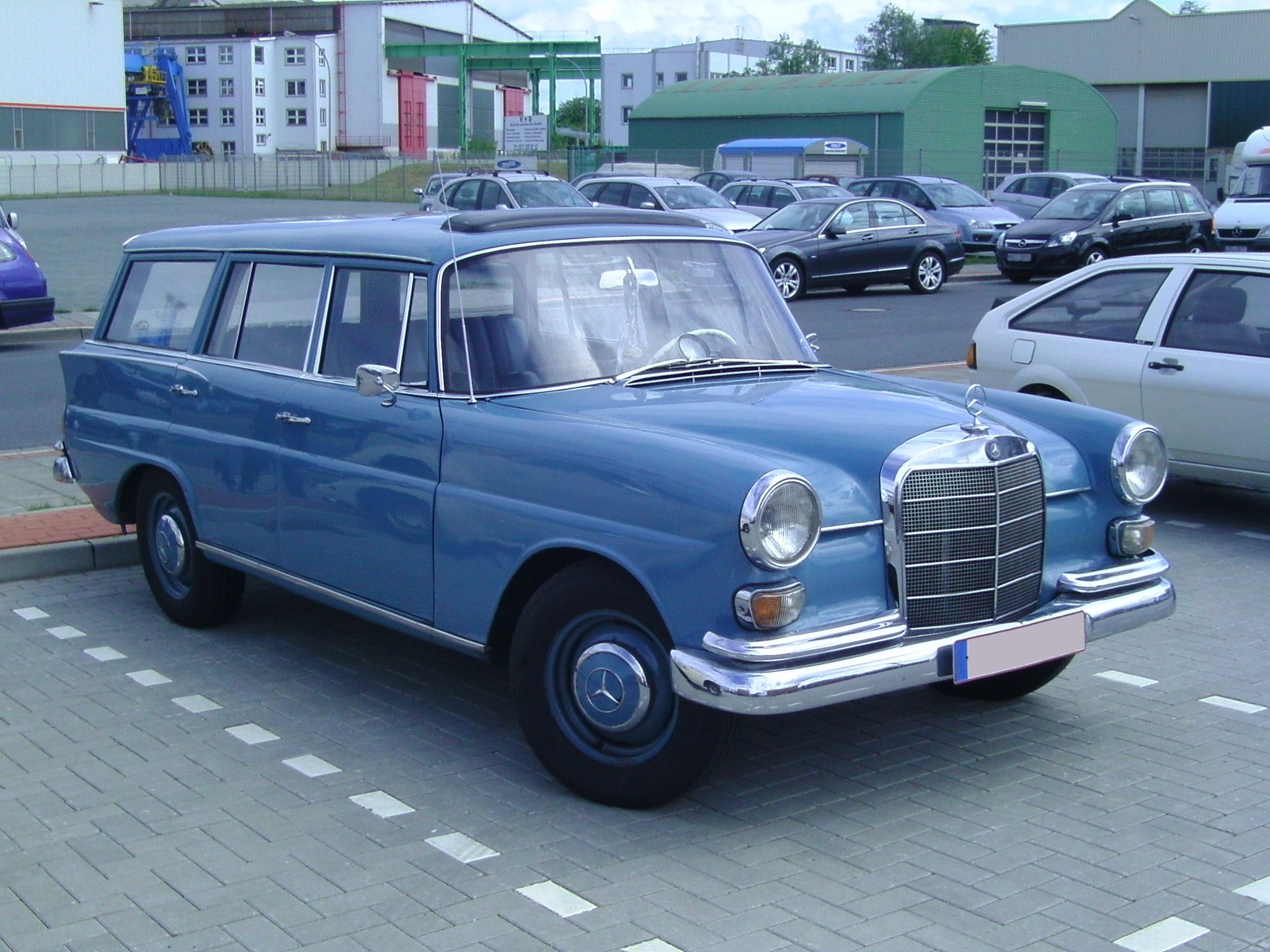
In 1965 Alexis Vlasto acquired a new sky-blue Mercedes-Benz 200 "Kombi": a very rare choice in Cambridge at that time.

By this time the focus of Vlasto's own academic work was on Slavonic Studies, a topic which the political concerns of the time had pushed up the national and academic agendas. Alexis Vlasto was one of those who participated, as part of a small but eminent group of scholars gathered together by the remarkable Elizabeth Hill, in the establishment of the Cambridge University Department of Slavonic Studies which opened in 1948. Vlasto finally received his PhD in 1953. He taught in the Department of Slavonic Studies at Cambridge from 1954 until his retirement in 1983.

1968 was a defining year in two contrasting respects. His book "The Entry of the Slavs into Christendom" was published. Its contribution to scholarship has stood the test of time. 1968 was also the year in which, on 15 September, Jill Vlasto died, aged just 52. In 1969 Alexis Vlasto was elected a fellow of Selwyn College, Cambridge. The Master of the college was Owen Chadwick, who would later remember Vlasto as "a man who combined the ability to be infuriatingly impractical at times with a warm and generous heart in friendship".

Retirement was gradual rather than sudden. Vlasto's other major work, "The Linguistic History of Russia", appeared in 1986 and continues to earn plaudits. In his final decades he was also able to devote more time to his principal long standing extra-curricular enthusiasms: music and botany. He had a deep knowledge of both subjects. In 1968 he collected seeds from a Silene viscariopsis, an unusual plant he had found in what was then Yugoslavia, and donated them to the University Botanic Garden. Plants grown from these seeds were distributed to botanical institutions around the world and opened the way to at least one significant research project.

Alexis Vlasto died at Cambridge on 20 July 2000.

== Selected works ==
- Vlasto, Alexis P. (1970). The Entry of the Slavs into Christendom: An Introduction to the Medieval History of the Slavs. Cambridge: Cambridge University Press. ISBN 9780521074599.
- The Linguistic History of Russia (1986)
