= Serbian historiography =

Methodology in Serbian history studies

Serbian historiography (Serbian Cyrillic: српска историографија, romanized: srpska istoriografija) refers to the historiography (methodology of history studies) of the Serb people since the founding of Serbian statehood. The development can be divided into four main stages: traditional historiography, Ruvarac's critical school, Communist–Marxist legacy, and the renewed Serbian national movement.

== History ==
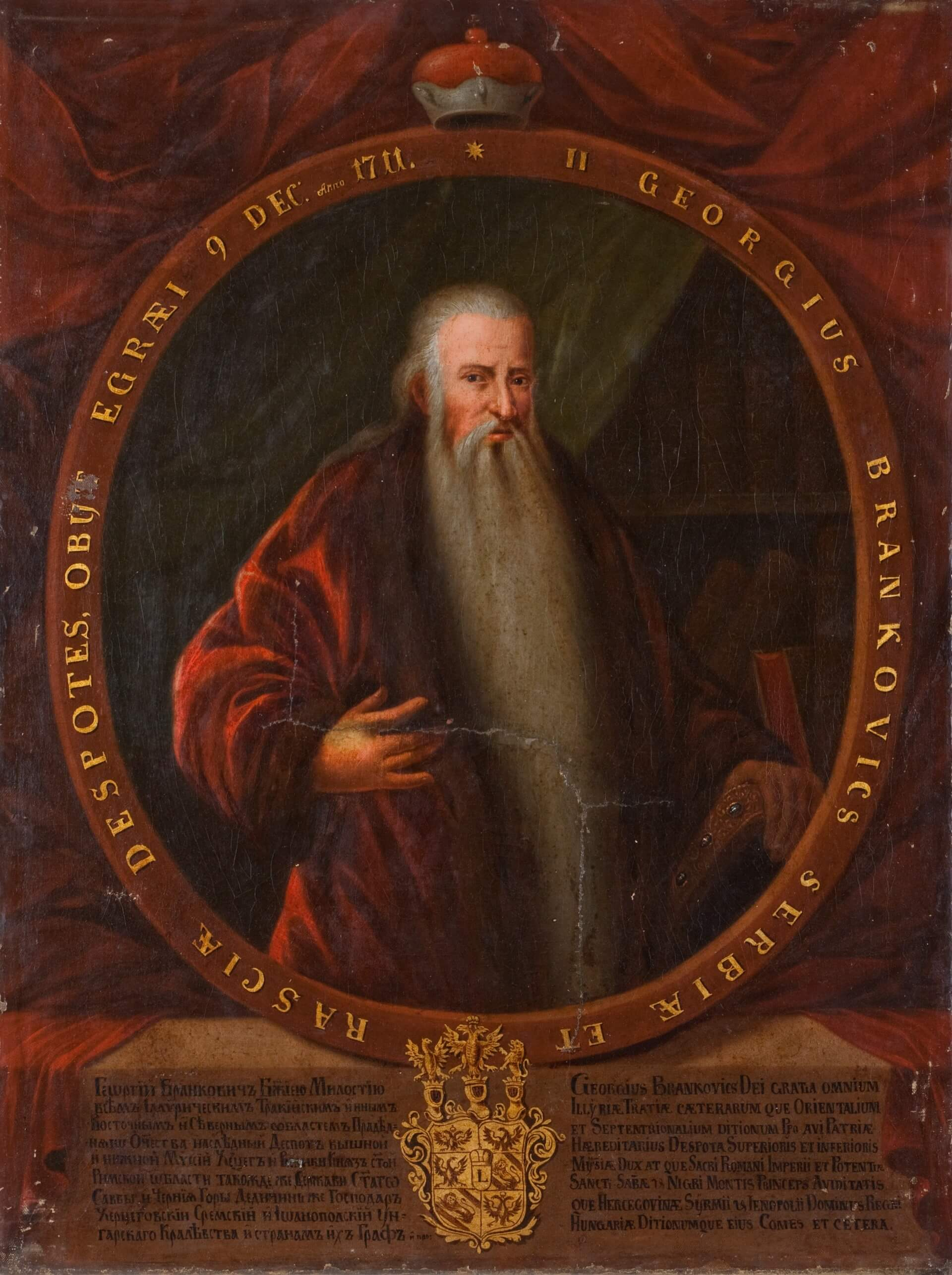
Count Đorđe Branković (d. 1711)

Count Đorđe Branković (d. 1711) wrote of the notable Slavo-Serbian Chronicles.

Jovan Rajić (1726–1801) was the forerunner to modern Serbian historiography, and has been compared to the importance of Nikolay Karamzin to Russian historiography.

Two works mark the key beginning of modern Serbian historiography, through which domestic scholarship became part of the European historiographical sphere: Julinac’s A Short Introduction to the History of the Origin of the Slavo-Serbian People (1765) and Jovan Rajić’s History of Various Slavic Peoples, Especially of the Bulgarians, Croats, and Serbs (written in 1768 but published only in 1794–95). Rajić’s History of Various Slavic Peoples represents, by its content and style, an exceptional intellectual achievement and a monumental work. Nikola Radojčić, who was an expert on the topic Serbian historiography, stated that it can be said without exaggeration that Jovan Rajić inaugurated Serbian history, alongside Julinac. The work of Jovan Rajić differed from previous works through systematic exposition, critical use of sources, maps, genealogical tables, and notes, as well as by adopting a European historical perspective. Although the work is not without flaws, such as an excessive focus on medieval state of Raška, the incorrect identification of certain ancient tribes as Slavic, and reliance on indirect sources, its importance remains fundamental. As an adapter of European historical thought, Rajić was the first in Serbian literature to systematically shape historical terminology. In the absence of predecessors and within the complex linguistic situation of the 18th century, he successfully introduced foreign concepts, titles, and hierarchical relations, and was the first to use the term “feudal” in the sense corresponding to the German lehnkönig. Based on his remarks on the Patarenes, Rajić may also be considered one of the first authors to deal with the history of the Bosnian Church. A Short History and Rajić’s History complement one another, both were created with the intention of filling the gap in knowledge of the national past. Before publishing his major work, Rajić had demonstrated the same aspiration to spread historical knowledge beyond personal ambition, and together with Julinac, he restored the forgotten beginnings of Serbian historiography and was the first to include the period preceding Stefan Nemanja. Through his work, he laid the foundations of modern Serbian historiography and embodied the culture of the Age of Enlightenment. Serbian historiography then developed in dialogue with European scholarship.

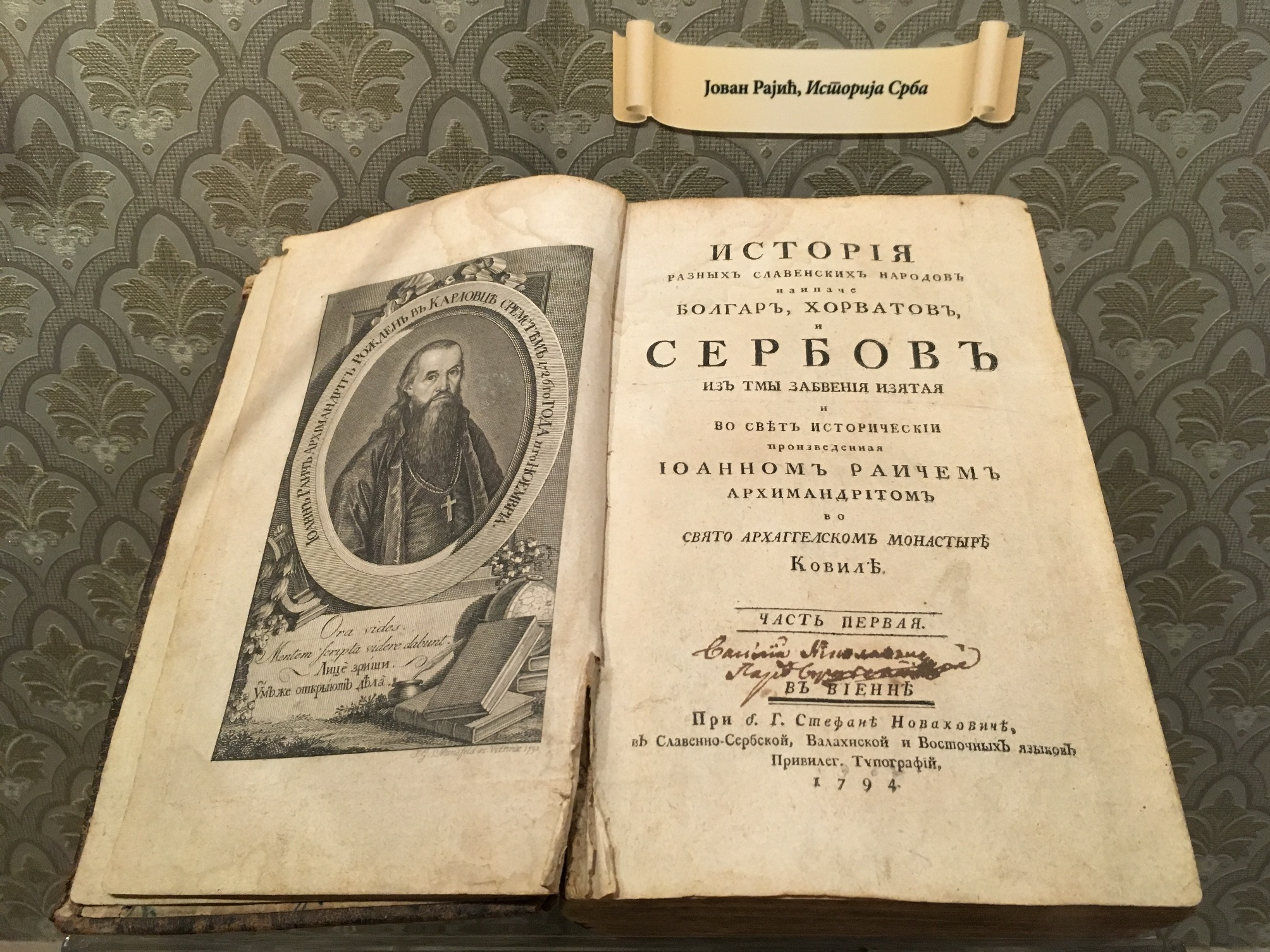
Jovan Rajić's The History of Various Slavic Peoples, especially of Bulgars, Croats and Serbs

Ilarion Ruvarac (1832–1905) is regarded the founder of the critical school of Serbian historiography. Ruvarac's school clashed with that of Panta Srećković. Srećković was the first professional historian of the Great School, was a pronounced liberal and patriot, but his History of the Serbian People was sharply criticized by Ilarion Ruvarac, who pointed out its methodological shortcomings. Ruvarac emphasized that patriotism required a realistic and critical attitude toward the past. Ruvarac and Ljubomir Kovačević advocated a critical, source-based approach, while Stojan Novaković represented a synthesis of popular and scholarly traditions. The division between the romantic and critical schools lasted for more than a decade and ended in 1893 with Srećković’s retirement. Ljubomir Kovačević then took over teaching duties at the Belgrade Higher School (later the University of Belgrade), marking a turn toward critical historiography, which subsequently gained dominance. New generations of historians educated abroad continued this orientation, and the polemic between romantics and critics shaped modern Serbian historiography as an independent scholarly discipline.

Serbian historiography was mostly focused on national issues during the Society of Serbian Scholarship and Serbian Learned Society (1841–1886). The development of historiography during the 19th century took place under the influence of European liberalism and positivist ideas. History was perceived as a means of national enlightenment and proof of identity, while Serbian students educated in Germany and France introduced into domestic scholarship the critical methods of modern historiography.

Until the end of the 19th century, Serbian historiography was not advanced by scholars fully trained as historians in the European sense. This early “amateur” period nevertheless had developmental value, as even self-taught authors preserved a critical spirit and laid the groundwork for the professionalization of the historical discipline. The first Serbian historical studies appeared in the mid-19th century. Aleksandar Stojačković was the first in Serbian historiography to write specialized studies on topics from national history based on archival sources.

Jireček (1855–1918) occupies a central place in Serbian and South Slavic historiography of the 19th and early 20th centuries. His work, based on the critical collection and analysis of sources, laid the foundations for further development of the discipline, and his best-known work, History of the Serbs, has remained one of the cornerstones for the study of medieval Serbia.

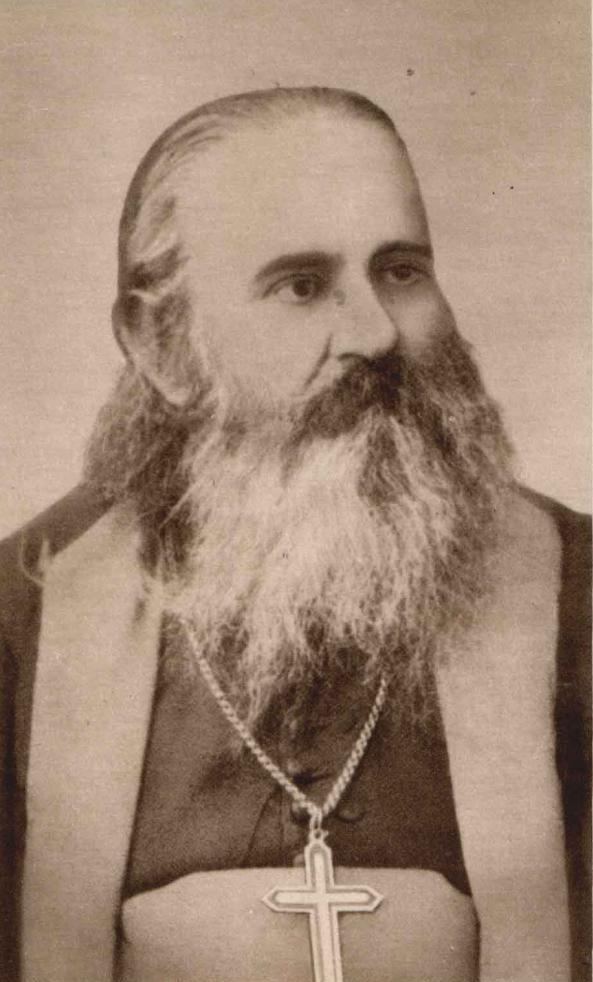
Ilarion Ruvarac, the founder of the critical school of Serbian historiography

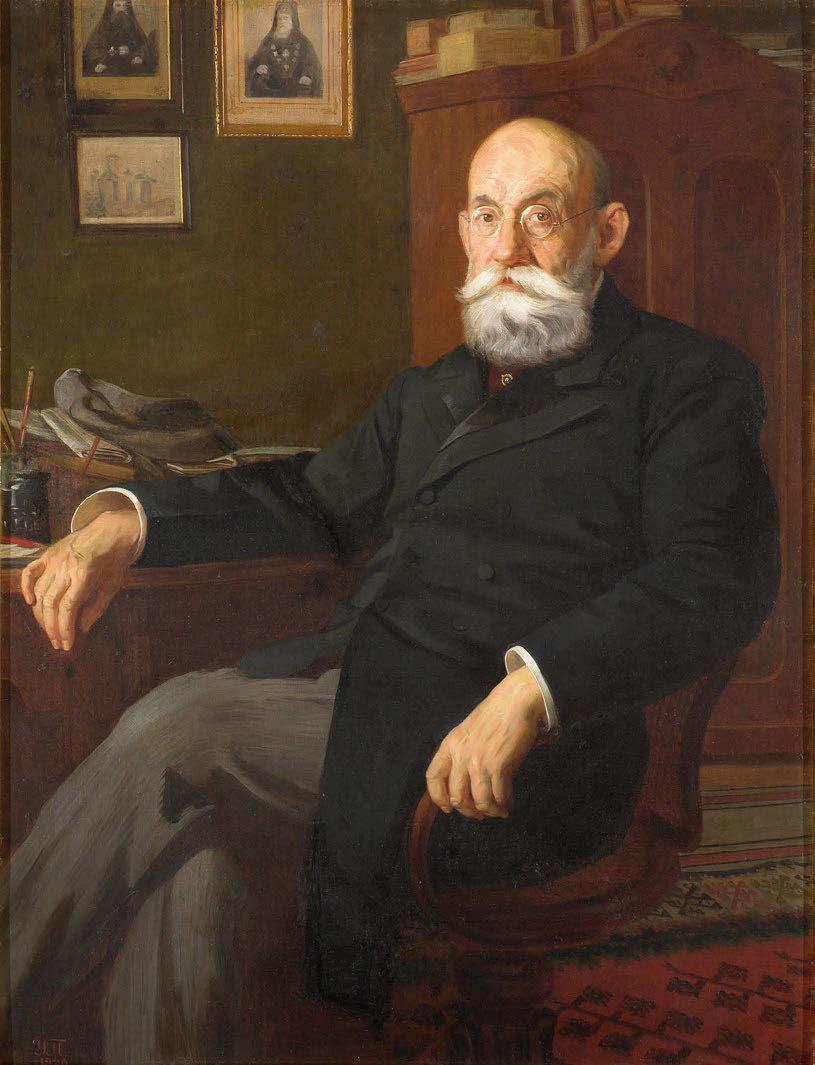
Stojan Novaković is regarded as one of the leading Serbian historians of the nineteenth century and a key figure in the development of modern Serbian historiography.

A main contributor to Serbian historiography during the nineteenth century was diplomat Stojan Novaković, who compiled a voluminous bibliography and is regarded as the "father of the discipline of historical geography in Serbia" focusing on the Serbian people and state during the Middle Ages and the origins and development of the modern Serbian state. Contemporary studies emphasize Stojan Novaković as a central figure in the advancement of Serbian historiography.

The foundations of Serbian ecclesiastical historiography were laid by Bishop Nikodim Milaš (1845–1915). Serbian ecclesiastical historiography has coincided with nationalist perspectives contained within secular Serbian historiography. Orthodox Church tradition and early Serbian historiography through folk poetry based upon the Battle of Kosovo assisted in overcoming gaps and linking the old with the then new Serbian state. The nation and religion were closely connected within nationalist Serbian history in the early 19th century.

Patriotic historiography viewed the Serbs as liberators from foreign oppression of their South Slavic brothers in the Balkan Wars and World War I. Serbian nationalists claim that in Communist historiography, Serbs were transformed into oppressors, the Chetniks of World War II branded as collaborationist as the Ustaše, and the massacres of Serbs were downplayed.

=== Socialist period ===
Throughout the post war era, though Tito denounced nationalist sentiments in historiography, those trends continued with Croat and Serbian academics at times accusing each other of misrepresenting each other's histories, especially in relation to the Croat-Nazi alliance. Historiography during the communist period was under great influence of the ruling ideology, which predetermined social phenomena as either progressive or regressive. Scientific research was most often given the role of confirming such assumptions, without room for scholarly critical re-examination. Nevertheless, numerous works from that period were valuable and still have lasting scholarly significance, especially on the factual level. Among them are the studies of academic Andrej Mitrović on the interwar history of Yugoslavia and the Balkan Peninsula, which are largely free of ideological qualifications.

The period 1945–1991 was not sufficiently used for the application of Western methodological and theoretical innovations. The Marxist approach was also not fully utilized, unlike in several Eastern European countries. The only Yugoslav historian who consistently sought to apply Marxist methodology was Branislav Đurđev. Many publications from this period aimed at creating a myth of the partisan struggle, often in the form of uncritical panegyrics comparable to medieval hagiographies, which affected the public reputation of the profession.

After 1945, Serbian historiography produced only a small number of works in the fields of economic and social history. Although Serbian historians maintained contacts with Fernand Braudel and other representatives of the Annales school, works of this orientation did not appear in Serbian historiography until after 1990. Translations of such works were rare until the 1980s. In international scholarship, the most prominent representative of this approach of Serbian origin, Traian Stoianovich, was largely neglected within the domestic academic community.

Among the few methodological contributions of the time, the works of Radovan Samardžić, Sima Ćirković, Andrej Mitrović, and Branko Petranović stand out.

In the postwar period, historical geography in Serbia gained more favorable conditions for development. Although many projects remained unfinished, this work significantly expanded the source base and methodology for studying medieval Serbia.

In post-WW2 Yugoslavia, Serbian historians claimed that histories of individual peoples no longer existed after unification in contrast to Slovene and Croat historians who claimed otherwise. From the 1950s onward intellectual activities came less under state control and by the 1960s debates about the Second World reappeared culminating with more works in the 1980s.

During the socialist period, there was not a weakening but rather a strengthening of the national character of both Serbian and other historiographies within Yugoslavia.

=== Post communist Serbian historiography ===
From the 1980s, a reexamination of ideological taboos and a shift in historiographical approaches began. The legacy of and myths about Josip Broz Tito were gradually dismantled. At the same time, the role of general Dragoljub Mihailović’s movement was reappraised, increasingly described as an antifascist movement abandoned by the British under the influence of Soviet intelligence operatives within British services. Historians from different republics presented differing versions of the history of non-communist movements. During the same period, the subject of civilian victims, particularly Serbian ones—previously attributed exclusively to the occupiers or to “domestic traitors”—was addressed. Historians also began to examine the victims of collectivization. Communist historiography was challenged in the 1980s and a rehabilitation of Serbian nationalism by Serbian historians began. Historians and other members of the intelligentsia belonging to the Serbian Academy of Sciences and Arts (SANU) and the Writers Association played a significant role in the explanation of the new historical narrative. The process of writing a "new Serbian history" paralleled alongside the emerging ethno-nationalist mobilisation of Serbs with the objective of reorganising the Yugoslav federation. According to Vjekoslav Perica, four factors and sources that influenced the "new history" include: Serbian ethno-nationalist ideology, Nationalism that originated from Church historiography and the Orthodox Church, Serbian émigré propaganda and myths and Genocide and Holocaust studies.

During the 1980s and 1990s, the main focus of nationalist history was Kosovo. Serbian academics such as Dušan Bataković obtained generous support for publishing nationalist works which were translated into other languages and other Serbian historians Dimitrije Bogdanović, Radovan Samardžić and Atanasije Urošević also produced similar works on Kosovo. Though some Serb historians did not promote nationalistic views, the practice of history within Serbia has been influenced by limitations placed upon it from state-sponsored nationalism. The focus of research for Serbian historians has been restricted to the Serbian experience of life under "the Turks" and only a few Serb historians can read Ottoman documents. As such, Habsburg documents have been used though Serbian historians sideline the corpus of local and important evidence based in Ottoman documents when compiling national history.

Using ideas and concepts from Holocaust historiography, Serbian historians alongside church leaders applied it to World War Two Yugoslavia and equated the Serbs with Jews and Croats with Nazi Germans. In relation to World War Two Serb casualties, during the Milošević era Serbian historians and the regime saw it as important to secure support from prominent Yugoslav Jews and organisations regarding the idea relating to a common Serbian-Jewish martyrdom. As such, a few Yugoslav Jews gave their assistance for the new Serbian historiography. In the 1980s, Serbian historians produced many works about the forced conversion during World War Two of Serbs to Catholicism in Ustaša Croatia. These debates between historians openly became nationalistic and also entered the wider media. Historians in Belgrade during the 1980s who had close government connections often went on television during the evenings to discuss invented or real details about the Ustaša genocide against Serbs during World War Two. These discussions had the effect of being theoretical deductions that served as a precursor for the eventual ethno-demographic engineering that took place in Croatia. During this time some well known Serbian historians such as Vasilije Krestić and Milorad Ekmečić were at the vanguard of the nationalist movement.

In the late 1980s and early 1990s, the most extensive undertaking in Serbian historiography, History of the Serbian People (1981–1993), was completed, covering the period up to 1918. It involved 44 authors from various fields. Despite the uneven quality of contributions, the work represents a synthesis of prior research and a turning point in the development of national historiography. At the same time, the most significant individual synthesis of Yugoslav history, The Creation of Yugoslavia, was published. Historian Đorđe Stanković published the two-volume work Nikola Pašić and the Yugoslav Question (1987), which is regarded as one of the most significant contributions of Serbian historiography in the late 20th century. Ljubodrag Dimić and Đorđe Stanković published in 1996 a survey of the development of Serbian historiography in the period 1945–1965. He applied the “new model of everyday history,” advocated for the modernization of historical research, and conducted pioneering studies on the history of historiography. From the mid-1980s to the early 21st century, Stanković played a notable role in the modernization of Serbian historiography.

Nikola Radojčić systematically studied the development of Serbian historiography, laying the foundations for later historians such as Radovan Samardžić and Kosta Milutinović. The general developmental trends are analyzed by Sima Ćirković and collaborators in the proceedings of the University of Belgrade.

During the 1990s, a generational change took place within the profession, leading to shifts in research topics. Despite the economic crisis in Serbia, historians’ work was supported by international cooperation, scholarships, and publishing programs. At the same time, there was a rise in para-historiography and the popularization of non-scientific interpretations. In the context of war, crisis, and sanctions, Serbian historians increasingly turned to theory, new methodological approaches, and self-reflection. One of the reasons for this was dissatisfaction with political history and its consequences. At the same time, the work of older historians Stojan Novaković and Slobodan Jovanović was reexamined, with scholarly conferences dedicated to their legacy. The leading methodologist of the period was Andrej Mitrović, whose works from 1991 onward focused on rethinking historiographical approaches.

Works from Serbian historians and ethnographers that were academically obsolete and politically biased aiming to justify Serb expansionism were republished a century later with some works going for a second edition in the 1990s. These works were praised by Serb historians because they viewed them as almost being primary sources due to their archaic style and closeness to the described events and hence promoted their republishing during the 1990s. Whereas the works and ideas of these 19th and early 20th century nationalistically oriented Serbian historians were expanded upon by writers on the Serbian literary scene during the 1990s. When the wars broke out during the 1990s, most Serbian historians focused on suffering that Serbs had undergone in previous conflicts to emphasize past Serbian victimisation, ethnic cleansing of Serbs and sexual assaults against Serbian women. Some Serbian historians defended the actions of the regime during the dissolution of Yugoslavia.

Medievalists achieved the greatest progress in the fields of social and cultural history, the history of everyday life, mentalities, law, and economy. The peak of this work is represented by the Lexicon of the Serbian Middle Ages (1999) by Sima Ćirković and Rade Mihaljčić, produced with the collaboration of 86 authors from different disciplines. In this period, the history of daily life was once again addressed. Historians examined the church, institutions, and parts of the social elite, while minority histories—except for the German and Jewish—were largely neglected. Serbian historians at this time maintained their closest contacts with institutions in German-speaking countries and with the School for Slavonic and East European Studies in London. Biographies of Serbian historians, historiographers, the history of scholarly societies and professional associations of historians, were covered in more than 700 pages of the extensive Encyclopedia of Serbian Historiography (1997), edited by academics Sima Ćirković and Rade Mihaljčić.

=== Since 2000 ===
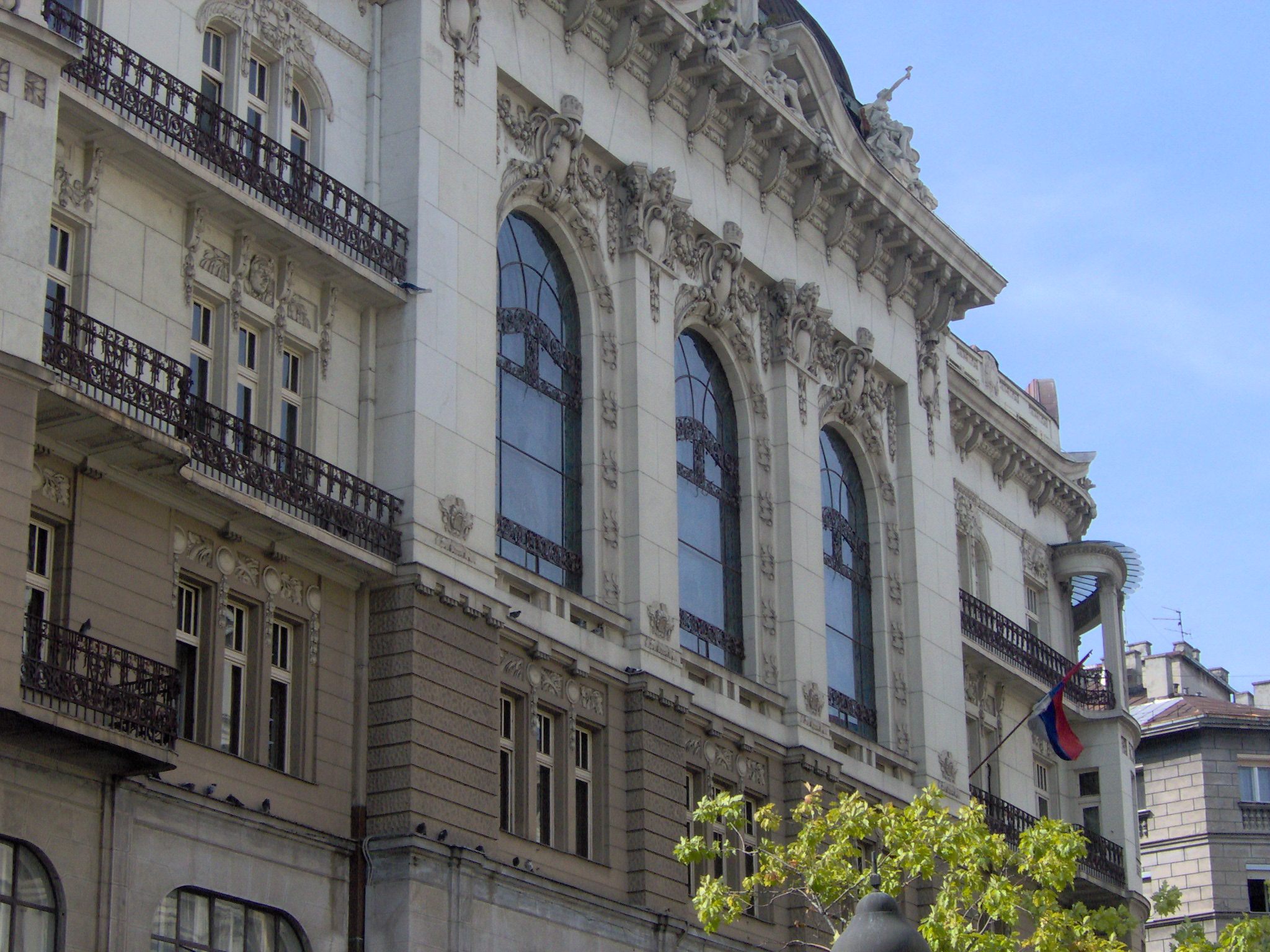
Serbian Academy of Sciences and Arts façade; the Academy includes several scientific institutes dedicated to the study of national and Balkan history.

Serbian historiography in contemporary times still remains politically sensitive. The fall of the Milošević regime (2000) heralded divisions within the intelligentsia about coming to terms with the recent wartime past and moral responsibility in Serbia. Amongst liberal historians their efforts have been concentrated on refuting nationalist discourses prominent in media and public views and the failure of embracing modernity by Serbian society. Their views about the dissolution of Yugoslavia are based upon the wider polarization and mass debate contained in Serbian public debate regarding the past and as replies to nationalist discourses of historians affiliated with the nationalist-patriotic group.

Few Serbian scholars have critically engaged with literature of Serbian historiography that is based heavily on myth. Of those that have include historian Miodrag Popović who stated that Serbian history in the Ottoman Empire is separate from myths contained in Serbian folk poetry. Popović added that myths about the "Turkish yoke" and "slavery under the Turks" were a product of later times meant to mobilize Serbs during the nation-state building process which is why the myth contains so much anti-Islamic and anti-Turkish views. Byzantinist Radivoj Radić wrote on the topic of pseudohistory and the work of pseudo-historians, who flooded Serbian popular literature by introducing pseudoscientific formulations. On their negative impact on science, he wrote the books Srbi pre Adama i posle njega (2003) and Klío se stidi: Protiv zlostavljanja istorijske nauke (2016). Another critical book on the state of Serbian historiography entitled Kriza istorije: srpska istoriografija i društveni izazovi kraja 20. i početka 21. veka was published by Miroslav Jovanović and Radivoj Radić.

In recent years, there have been positive developments in Serbian historiography in the diversity of topics and range of research undertaken by many Serbian historians. Serbian scholars who have taken a critical or negative approach to twentieth-century Serbian historiography include Dubravka Stojanović, Olga Manojlović-Pintar, Olga Popović-Obradović, Latinka Perović and Đorđe Stanković. Stojanović has criticized the content and tone of Serbian textbooks published after 1990. Stanković, who headed the department of history at the University of Belgrade challenged the rehabilitation of Nazi collaborationists by providing documentation which demonstrated the Milan Nedić quisling government's culpability in war crimes. Serbian historian Tibor Živković in 2012 was critical about the Serbian historiography dealing with early medieval period, stating that the Belgrade Byzantist school after the 1940s until present, was defending the De Administrando Imperio's account about the migration of the Serbs and Croats, without any criticism but also misunderstanding the whole DAI, with a lot of repetition stuck 150 years behind contemporary international historiography.

Historian Mile Bjelajac criticized certain Serbian historians for “collegial opportunism,” that is, for not writing sharp critiques or for writing positive reviews as a gesture toward colleagues.

== Themes ==
Serbian historiography (19th century - present) has through its historians developed various historiographical positions, views and conclusions on subjects and topics that relates to the study of Serbian history and the Serb people. Of those are:

=== Medieval and pre-independence periods ===
In Serbian historiography there is a divergence of positions regarding Byzantine cultural influence on Serbia with some Serbian historians supporting the view that there was and others seeing it as being minimal. Serbian historians have contended that Vlachs in Dalmatia during the early Middle Ages were thoroughly Slavonicised and hence to be really Serbs. The rivalry between Prince Branimir (ruled 879–887) who chose (Catholic) Rome over (Orthodox) Constantinople and Duke Zdeslav (ruled 878–879) who favoured Constantinople ended in execution of the latter by the former. In Serbian church historiography, Zdeslav is viewed as a martyr of the Orthodox church and Branimir's rise to power is interpreted as disastrous that divided two Slavic peoples who both until that time leaned toward the Orthodox church. King Zvonimir (ruled 1075–1089) a figure who consolidated Catholicism and rejected Orthodoxy in Croatia is viewed by Serbian Church historians as an enemy of the Orthodox Christian religion. Some Serbian historians contend that the medieval Bosnian Church was part of the Orthodox church and not heretical.

Serbian historiography emphasizes an Orthodox Serbian origin for the Bosniaks who are interpreted as relinquishing ties to that ethno-religious heritage after converting to Islam and later denying it by refusing to accept a Serbian identity. While the battle of Kosovo (1389) against Muslim Ottoman forces has been taken out of its context within Serbian historiography. That event has been utilized by placing it within the wider Serbian political objective of vilifying Bosnian Muslims by associating their conversion to Islam with the identity of the Ottoman invader. Bosnian Muslims within the bulk of Serbian nationalist historiography are presented as the descendants of the mentally ill, lazy, slaves, greedy landlords, prisoners, thieves, outcasts or as Serbs who, confused and defeated, chose to follow their enemies' religion. Serbian historiography mythologized the emergence of Islam within the Balkans as the outcome of coercion and the devşirme system instead of it being a genuine and complex phenomenon.

Serbian history often emphasizes that the Patriarchate of Peć was reestablished (1557) by Sokollu Mehmed Pasha, a grand vizier from Bosnia who by origin was of Orthodox Christian heritage and thus claimed as a Serb in Serbian history, while a relative of his became the first patriarch. To demonstrate the Serb character of Bosnia and Hercegovina, Serbian historians have cited that the region upon its submission to the jurisdiction of the Serbian Orthodox Patriarchate led to the Serbianisation of most of the territory. In some Serbian historiography, the Orthodox clergy is ascribed as having played a leading military and ideological role during the First Serbian Uprising (1804–1813). Adopting mainly the perspective of Eastern European traditions, Serbian historiography views the national struggle as having been attained through liberation from what has been referred to as "five centuries of" the "Turkish yoke". Serbian historiography views the Serbs as being at the vanguard of protecting Balkan Christians.

=== Independence, World War One and Interwar Yugoslavia ===
From the first Serbian Uprising (1804) onward, Serb historians have viewed the Balkans as a region of perpetual ethnic conflicts of whom Balkan peoples have been anti-Serb for centuries. Within Serbian historiography, "minority" groups have been portrayed as unreliable with "natural" tendencies for rebellion, treachery and deceit. Within Serbian historiography references to Muslim treachery and Albanian irredentism were made that coincided with new campaigns to expel people from Macedonia and Kosovo to Turkey.

Serbian historiography holds the view that Russians and Serbs have a special relationship expressed through Slavophilism and pan-Slavism and that both peoples are part of a larger Slavic "brotherhood". In the early 20th century, Serbian historiography in geography textbooks had a tendency to serving the political goal of Greater Serbia by viewing the bulk of Balkan Slavic lands as inhabited by Serbs, until the Yugoslav idea gradually shifted those views. Patriotic Serbian historiography portrays the Serbs during the Balkan Wars (1912–1913) and World War One (1914–1918) as liberating fellow South Slavs from foreign oppressors. Serbian historians have viewed the Balkan wars (1912–1913) as mainly a Serbian event of state expansion. Regarding the post-World War One unification of Montenegro with Serbia, Serbian alongside Montenegrin historians attempted to critically analyze the events though were hampered by political concerns and ideological bias of the Yugoslav era. Only in recent times have a few Serbian and Montenegrin historians with less ideological baggage attempted to engage with the events. Serbian historians assert that during the period of the Balkan Wars, a Macedonian nation was nonexistent and that local Slavs were either Serbian or Bulgarian.

The assassin Gavrilo Princip who in Sarajevo (1914) killed Archduke Franz Ferdinand is viewed by Serbian historians as a Serbian hero. A majority of Serbian historians view Austria-Hungary and Germany (Central Powers) as instigating the First World War while the actions of Mlada Bosna are presented as being autonomous and not dependent on Serbian government circles. The role of the Russian Empire and the position it took on the eve of war is portrayed favorably within Serbian historiography.

Some Serbian historians are of the view that the ideology of Yugoslavism and the creation of the banovinas diminished Serbian identity. Others Serbian historians have suggested the opposite in that the banovinas strengthened Yugoslavia by making Serbs the dominant group within 6 of them. The actions of Serbs within interwar Yugoslavia are portrayed in nationalist Serbian historiography as defensive and to safeguard the state from Croatian secessionism that is blamed for state's unstable interwar parliamentary system.

=== World War Two ===
Chetniks along with the Ustaša were vilified by Tito era historiography within Yugoslavia. In the 1980s, Serbian historians initiated the process of reexamining the narrative of how World War Two was told in Yugoslavia which was accompanied by the rehabilitation of Chetnik leader Draža Mihailović. Monographs relating to Mihailović and the Chetnik movement were produced by some younger historians who were ideologically close to it toward the end of the 1990s. Being preoccupied with the era, Serbian historians have looked to vindicate Chetnik history by portraying Chetniks as righteous freedom fighters battling the Nazis while removing from history books the ambiguous alliances with the Italians and Germans. Whereas the crimes committed by Chetniks against Croats and Muslims in Serbian historiography are overall "cloaked in silence". During the Milošević era, Serbian history was falsified to obscure the role Serbian collaborators Milan Nedić and Dimitrije Ljotić played in cleansing Serbia's Jewish community, killing them in the country or deporting them to Eastern European concentration camps.

The topic of World War Two Serbian population casualties has been strongly debated since the conclusion of World War Two. Within Serbian historiography, documenting Nazi and Ustaša crimes against the Roma, Jews and Serbs was undertaken as a priority. For Serbian historians, the Independent State of Croatia was responsible for the death of hundreds of thousands of Serbs throughout rural areas and in concentration camps such as Jasenovac. During the 1980s and 1990s, the issue of World War Two civilian casualties were contested and subject to manipulation between Croats and Serbs. Serbian historians alongside politicians exaggerated often the figures of those killed at Jasenovac to spread fear among the wider Serbian populace during the breakup of Yugoslavia.

Historiography within Tito's Yugoslavia had presented the Ustaša Independent State of Croatia (NDH) as an imposition of Nazi invaders and a deviation within the history of the Croats. By the middle of the 1980s this portrayal was challenged by Serbian historians. They contended that the Independent State of Croatia was a well organised entity that inflicted genocide upon the Serbs that had been in the making for several centuries in Croatia. During the 1980s, the Vatican became a focus for Serbian historiography. The popes were depicted as anti-Serbian, as being intrinsic to the demise of interwar Yugoslavia and taking part in the genocide against Serbians within the pro-Axis Independent State of Croatia. The new Serbian historiography of the 1980s of which secular and church historians contributed highlighted the role that religion played in being as the main source of Serbian-Croatian enmities. The Catholic Church was portrayed as the main carrier of hatred that inspired the idea of genocide against the Serbs during World War Two. In the works of nationalist Serbian historians, the Vatican is linked to a recurring Croatian plot to destroy Serbia. Using analogies from the Vatican's historic role in the Balkans, Serbian historians asserted that the Vatican did not understand the implications of the Muslim-Albanian awakening in Kosovo and other parts of Yugoslavia.

Among Serbian historians focusing on World War Two, they interpret the Albanian Balli Kombëtar movement as either "anti-Yugoslav" or "counter revolutionary". While the Bujan Conference (1943) is viewed as contravening the anti-fascist struggle due to Albanian communists insisting on the allocation of Kosovo to Albania at the war's conclusion. Though Tito was against such unification, in the 1980s Serbian historians held the Bujan meeting against him. Within Yugoslavia until the 1990s, Serbian historiography celebrated the aid given to Albania by Yugoslavia after the Second World War.

=== Kosovo ===
In Serbian historiography Prince Lazar, a figure who assembled Serb forces at the battle of Kosovo to fight the Ottomans is portrayed as a blessed martyr. Amidst the Kosovo Battle anniversary of the late 1980s, two Serbian historians independently concluded after critical historiographical analysis that Vuk Branković during the Kosovo battle was not a traitor and this finding is considered an important milestone for Serbian historiography. Of the Serbian historians who have accepted Serbian mythology, the battle of Kosovo is viewed as the main battle overriding all other battles and for some of them it is viewed as a historical idea assisting the nation to connect with a real historical past. Serbian historians until the late 1940s were still portraying the Kosovo battle as a "victory" of the Serbs over the Ottoman Turks. Serbian historiography contends that from the Battle of Kosovo (1389) onward, Serbians have undergone centuries of oppression by the Muslim-Ottoman Empire and they have fought to restore their medieval Serbian empire. The Kosovo myth still influences Serbian historiography as Serbian martyrdom and suffering alongside conflict and incompatibility between Christianity and Islam are emphasized. The battle of Kosovo is for Serbian historiography the historical event that legitimizes the claim of the Serbian character of Kosovo.

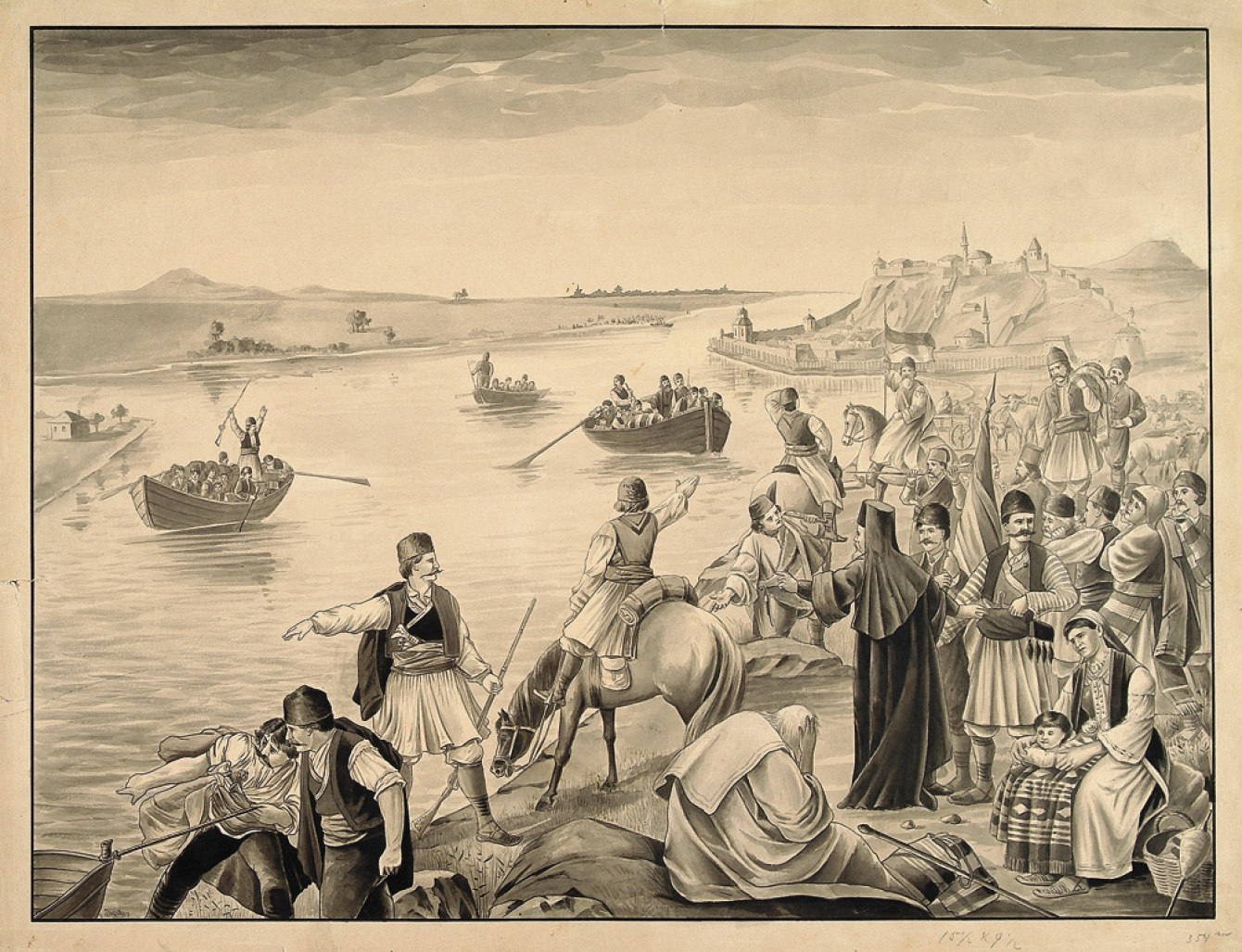
Serbs crossing the river for Austrian territory, 1690.

Some Serbian historians contend that a document issued on 6 April 1690 by the Austrian emperor referred to an "invitation" for Serbs to resettle in Hungary. Serbian settlement on the Pannonian plain is viewed within Serbian historiography as the outcome of a cataclysmic exodus from Kosovo that occurred in 1690 called the Great Migration (Velika Seoba) after Kosovo Serbs rebelled and joined incoming Habsburg forces battling the Ottomans. Serbian historians regard the migration as being undertaken on a huge scale.

Serbian historians have often dealt with Albanian history in an narrowly nationalist approach. Serbian historians dispute the argument that Albanians are the descendants of ancient Illyrians and being established in the region prior to the Slavs, while contending that the presence of Albanians in the Balkans starts from the 11th century. The majority of contemporary Serbian historiography portrays a situation of conflictual relations between Serbians and Albanians after they converted to Islam. Scholarship on Kosovo has also encompassed Ottoman provincial surveys that has revealed the 15th century ethnic composition of some Kosovo settlements, however like their Albanian counterparts, Serbian historians using these records have made much of them while proving little.

Serbian historiography does not support the viewpoint of the Historiography of Albania that the progenitors of Kosovan Albanians were native to Kosovo. Instead within Serbian historiography the presence of Kosovan Albanians and their eventual predominance in the region has been attributed by (nationalist) Serbian historians to a number of causes. Of those either the arrival and northward spread of Albanians from Albania after the Ottoman conquest, the Austro-Ottoman war that led to the northward migration of Serbs in 1690 with replacement by Albanians and or the assimilation of local Serbians into Albanians. Serbian national history views the Albanian presence in Kosovo apart from being recent immigrants as one that strongly supported and reinforced Ottoman rule meant to dislodge Serbs and to enforce Muslim control.

Many Serbian historians reject that Albanian family clans during the Ottoman period assisted to safeguard and preserve Orthodox monasteries and churches in Kosovo. Instead they contend that Albanians held imperial Ottoman military and administrative employment and were to blame as much as the Turks for the turmoil that forced many Serbs in 1690 and 1734 to migrate northward.

== See also ==
- Serbian Academy of Sciences and Arts

== Sources ==
- Aleksov, Bojan (2007). "Adamant and treacherous: Serbian historians on religious conversions". In Washburn, Dennis; Reinhart, Kevin (eds.). Converting Cultures: Religion, Ideology and Transformations of Modernity. Brill. ISBN 978-90-04-15822-1.
- Anscombe, Frederick (2006). "The Ottoman Empire in Recent International Politics - II: The Case of Kosovo" (PDF). The International History Review. 28 (4): 758–793. doi:10.1080/07075332.2006.9641103. JSTOR 40109813. S2CID 154724667. Archived from the original (PDF) on 2019-09-24.
- Bieber, Florian; Galijaš, Armina (2016). Debating the End of Yugoslavia. Routledge. ISBN 978-1-317-15424-2.
- Bećirević, Edina (2014). Genocide on the Drina River. Yale University Press. ISBN 978-0-300-19258-2.
- Karić, Enes (2011). "Islam in the Balkans". In El Hareir, Idris; Mbaye, Ravane (eds.). The Spread of Islam Throughout the World. UNESCO Publishing. ISBN 978-92-3-104153-2.
- Nielsen, Christian Axboe (2020). "Serbian Historiography after 1991" (PDF). Contemporary European History. 29 (1): 90–103. doi:10.1017/S096077731900033X.
- Perica, Vjekoslav (2002). Balkan idols: Religion and nationalism in Yugoslav states. Oxford University Press. ISBN 978-0-19-517429-8.
- Ramet, Sabrina Petra (2002). Balkan Babel: The Disintegration Of Yugoslavia From The Death Of Tito To The Fall Of Milošević. Westview Press. p. 19. ISBN 978-0-8133-3905-4. "Serbian historians debates."
- Stojanović, Dubravka (2011a). "Value changes in the interpretations of history in Serbia". In Listhaug, Ola (ed.). Civic and uncivic values: Serbia in the post-Milošević era. Central European University Press. ISBN 978-963-9776-98-2.
- Stojanović, Dubravka (2011b). Ramet, Sabrina; Listhaug, Ole (eds.). Serbia and the Serbs in World War Two. Springer. ISBN 978-0-230-34781-6.
- Woolf, D.R. (2014). A Global Encyclopedia of Historical Writing. Routledge. pp. 825–. ISBN 978-1-134-81998-0.
- Ćirković, Sima (2007). O istoriografiji i metodologiji. Belgrade: Istorijski institut. ISBN 978-86-7743-060-3.
