= List of Serbian historians =

This is a list of Serbian historians, including area of expertise.

- Čedomir Antić (born 1974), the modern history of Serbia
- Lazar Arsenijević Batalaka (1793–1869), history of the Serbian revolution (1803–1813)
- Dušan T. Bataković (1957–2017), the modern history of Serbia
- Miloš Blagojević (1930–2012), medieval Serbia
- Dimitrije Bogdanović (1930–1986), medieval Serbia and church history
- Veselin Čajkanović (1881–1946), classical
- Vladimir Ćorović (1885–1941), medieval Serbia and Bosnia
- Sima Ćirković (1929–2009), medieval Serbia and Bosnia
- Vladimir Dedijer (1914–1990), World War II
- Ljubodrag Dimić (born 1956), history of Yugoslavia
- Dimitrije Đorđević (1922–2009), modern Balkans
- Milorad Ekmečić (1928–2015), the modern history of Serbia and Bosnia
- Božidar Ferjančić (1929–1998), medieval Serbia and Byzantine Empire
- Andra Gavrilović (1864–1929), literary history
- Vojislav Korać (1924–2010), medieval architecture
- Lazo M. Kostić (1897–1979), modern ethnology
- Vasilije Krestić (born 1932), Serb-Croat relations and Yugoslavia
- Svetislav Mandić (1921–2003), medieval Serbian culture
- Smilja Marjanović-Dušanić (born 1963), medieval Serbia
- Dejan Medaković (1922–2008), art
- Čedomilj Mijatović (1842–1932), medieval Serbia
- Rade Mihaljčić (1937–2020), medieval Serbia and Bosnia
- Siniša Mišić (b. 1961), medieval Serbia, geography
- Andrej Mitrović (1937–2013), 20th century
- Stojan Novaković (1842–1915), medieval Serbia
- George Ostrogorsky (1902–1976), Byzantine Empire
- Stevan K. Pavlowitch (1933–2022), modern Balkans
- Branko Petranović (1927–1994), Yugoslavia
- Dušan J. Popović (1894–1965), Habsburg Serbs
- Miodrag Purković (1907–1976), medieval Serbia
- Radivoj Radić (born 1954), Byzantine Empire
- Svetozar Radojčić (1909–1978), medieval Serbia
- Srđan Rudić (born 1968), medieval Serbia, Bosnia and Montenegro
- Radovan Samardžić (1922–1994), medieval Serbia and Ragusa, Ottoman Empire
- Dragoslav Srejović (1931–1996), archaeology
- Stanoje Stanojević (1874–1937), medieval Serbia
- Tibor Živković (1966–2013), medieval Balkans
- Sima Lukin Lazić (1862–1904), first to write prehistory of Serbia
- Jakov Ignjatović (1822-1889), literary history
- Pavle Julinac (1730-1785), first historiographical work on Serbs

== See also ==
- List of historians
- Serbian historiography
