= Dubravnica =

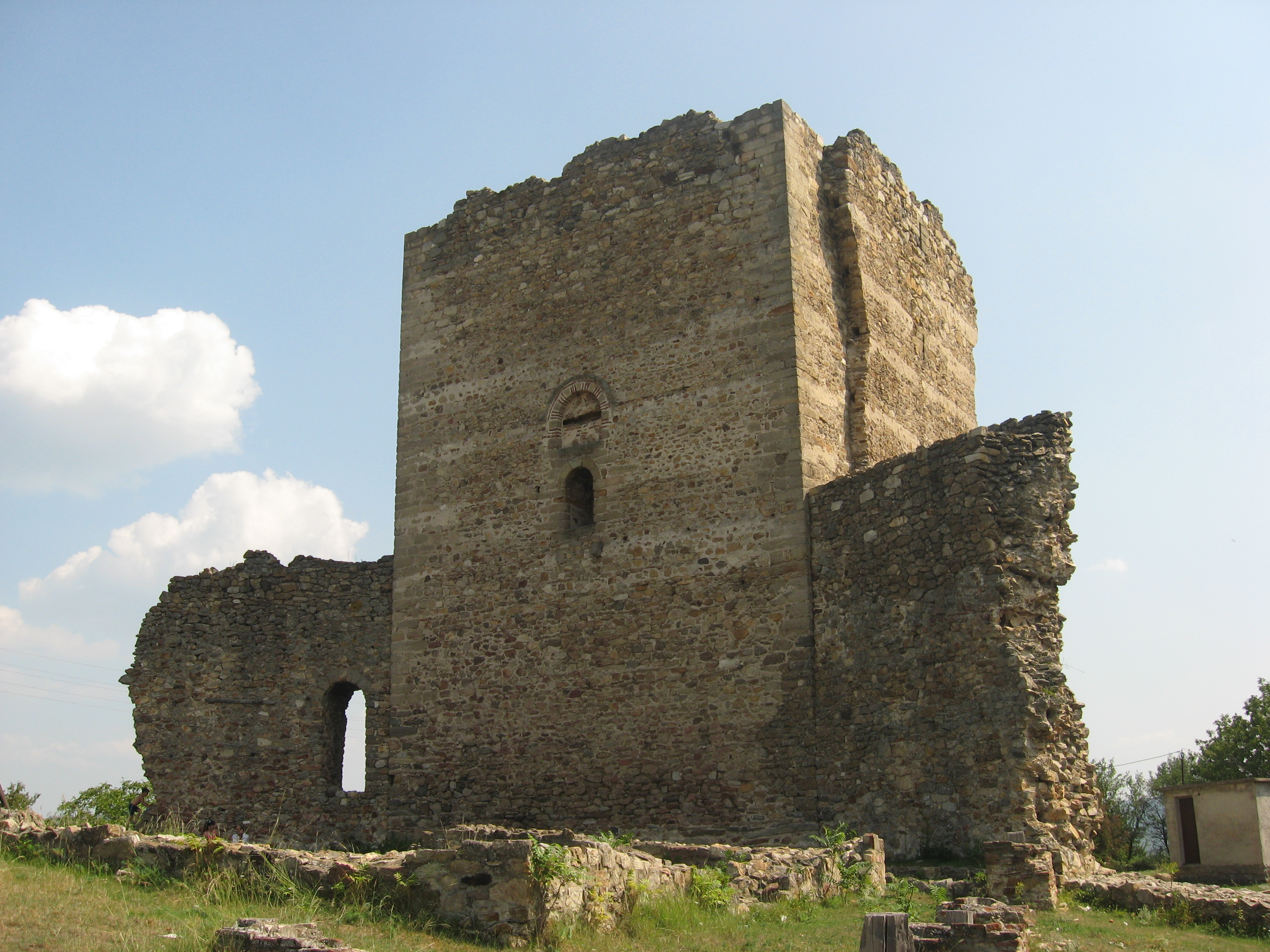
Stalać Fortress.

Dubravnica (Serbian: Дубравница, from dubrava, "oak forest"), was a medieval župa (county) stretching roughly from Stalać to Ćuprija, mentioned in the late 14th century.

The župa stretched from Stalać to the Bagrdan gorge north of Ćuprija, and further along the banks of Velika Morava and 10 kilometers to the east. It was thus situated on the right banks of Velika Morava, between Ćuprija and Stalać, securing roads from Bulgaria into the Serbian interior. It was established as a result of internal colonisation, the valley of Velika Morava being intensively populated especially in the 1360s. It became part of the Petrus krajište (military frontier administrative unit) following the administrative reorganization and dissolvement of the župa of Pomoravlje, having constituted its northern parts (while its southern parts likely became a krajište based in Lipovac Fortress and Bolvan).

The vlastelin-krajišnik (military governor) of Petrus, Crep Vukoslavić, and the unnamed vlastelin-krajišnik of Lipovac, stopped an Ottoman invasion in the winter of 1380/1381 at the field of Dubravnica near Petrus, in the Battle of Dubravnica.

== Sources ==
- Bojković, Gordan (2024). "Contribution to the studies of the Krajišta of the medieval Serbia: Krajišta of Petruš and Lipovac". Bastina (63). Centre for Evaluation in Education and Science (CEON/CEES): 331–337. doi:10.5937/bastina34-51487. ISSN 0353-9008.
- Bojković, Gordan (2010). "Параћин у средњем веку". Весник: орган војних музеја. 37. Београд: 141–147.
- Mišić, Siniša; Đokić, Nebojša (2011). "Капија Поморавља у историјској и војно стратегијској географији". In Mišić, Siniša (ed.). Капија Поморавља. Варварин. pp. 109–152 – via ResearchGate.
- Mišić, Siniša (2007). "Жупе Поморавље и Дубравница у средњем веку". In Aleksić, Dragan (ed.). Делиград од устанка ка независности: 1806-1876. : зборник радова са међународног научног скупа одржаног 2. септембра 2006. године у Алексинцу. Београд: Институт за новију историју Србије. pp. 1–7.
- Mišić, Siniša (2010). "Петрушко и Липовачко крајиште од половине XIV века до 1459. године". Расин. ан. 8: 121–128.
- Štetić, Marina (2016). "Алексиначки крај у средњем веку". Алексинац и околина у прошлости, 500 година од првог писаног помена 1516–2016, зборник радова са међународног научног скупа одржаног 3. септембра 2016. године у Алексинцу. Завичајни музеј Алексинац. pp. 49–63. ISBN 978-86-917433-6-9.
