= Vukoslavić noble family =

Serbian noble family

Vukoslavić
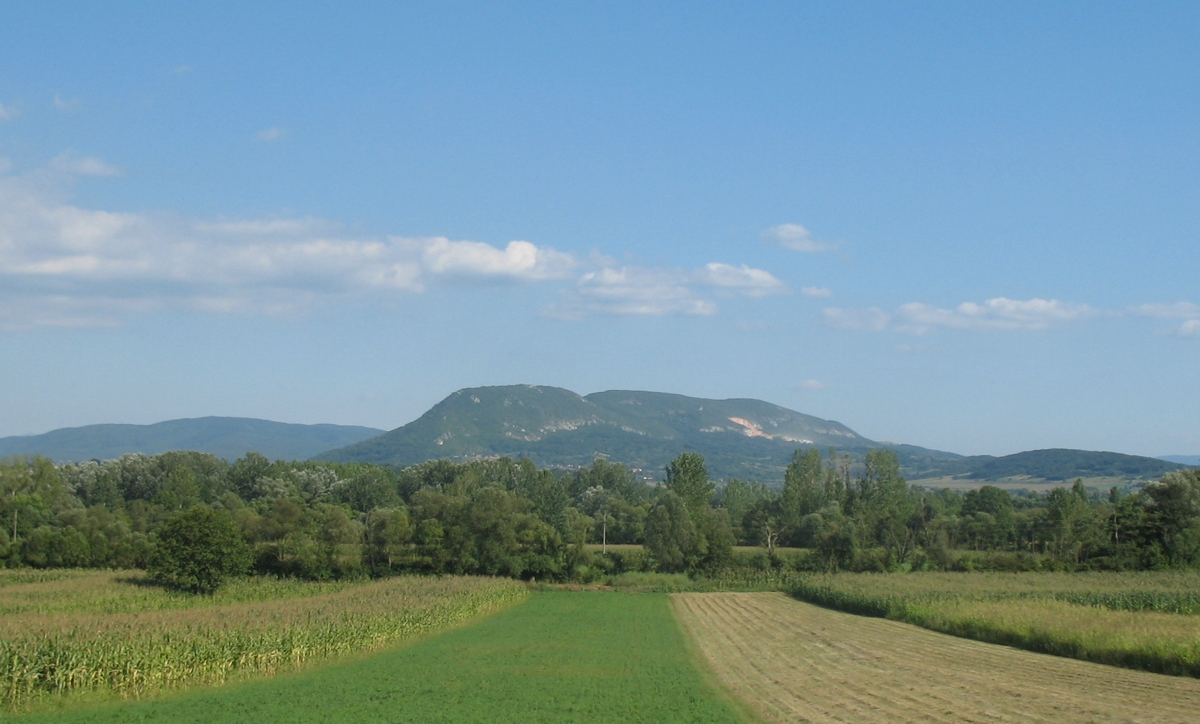
- Baba mountain
- Country: Serbian Kingdom, Empire and Despotate
- Founded: Before 1331
- Titles: župan, vojvoda, vlastelin-krajišnik
- Estate: Petrus (Paraćin region)
- Dissolution: 1389

The Vukoslavić family (Serbian: Вукославић) was a Serbian noble family that held the Petrus krajište (military frontier administrative unit), located around Paraćin, in the 14th century.

== History ==
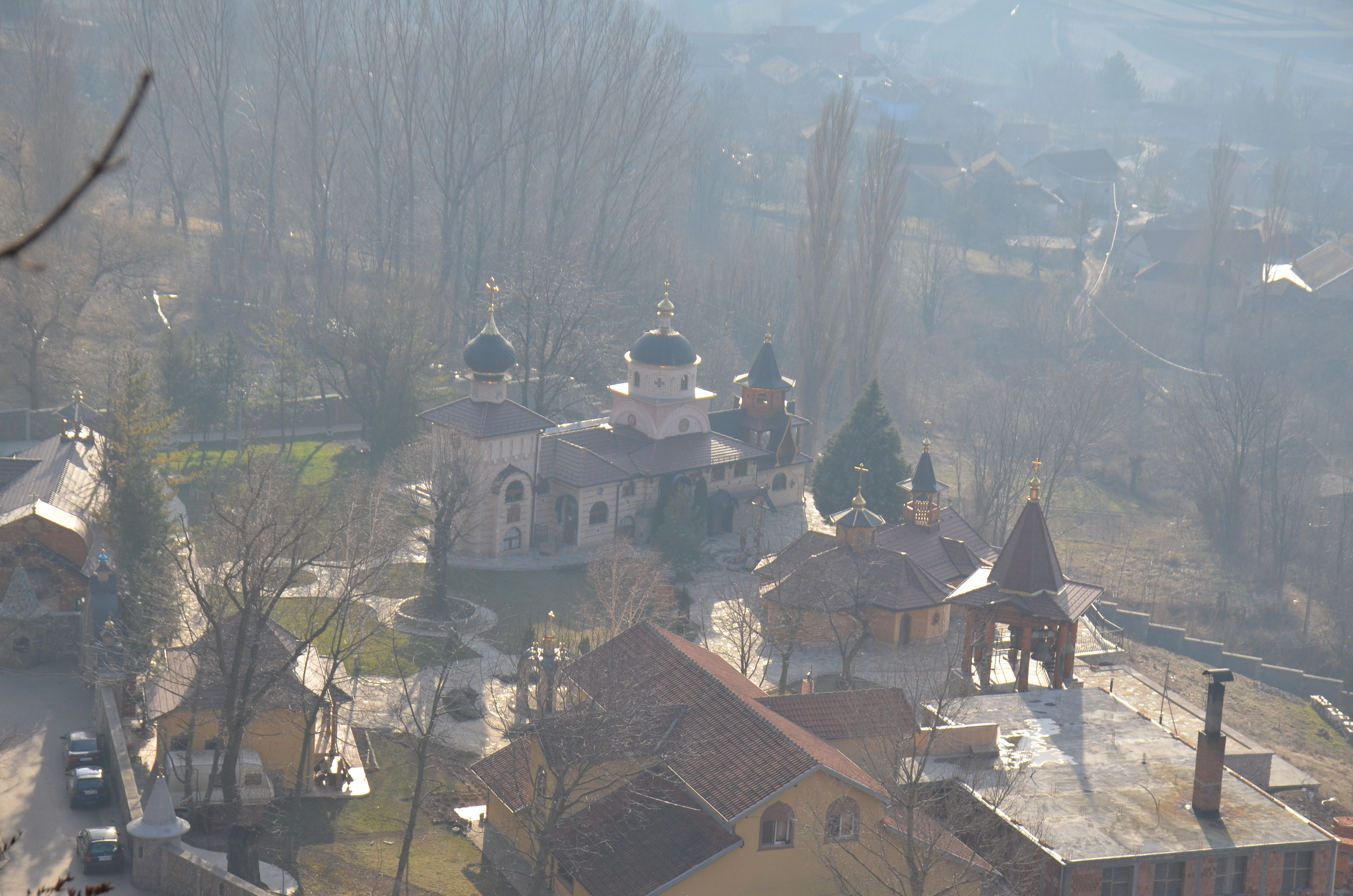
Lešje monastery.

According to Mavro Orbin (1601), Crep, a župan of Serbian king Stefan Dečanski (r. 1322–1331), had held territory in Trebinje, Gacko and Rudine and was killed in battle at Trebinje by the Branivojević family of Hum. This happened some time between 1328 and 1331, and Crep's son, župan Vukoslav, took his family and part of the population to the eastern part of the Serbian lands, and settled in the desert of Petrus some time between 1331 and 1346. Vukoslav and his sons Crep and Držman built a fortress at the Baba mountain and a church dedicated to the Holy Theotokos in the village of Lešje/Leštije, in their vlastelinstvo (feudal domain). Vukoslav was thus given a province (oblast) that connected Pomoravlje (Ćuprija and Paraćin) with the lower part of the Timok Valley over Čestobrodice, by Emperor Dušan the Mighty (r. 1331–1355). In the coming decades, the feudal domain economically expanded. In the Hilandar charter of 1360 by emperor Uroš V (r. 1355–1371), Vukoslav's donations to Hilandar were confirmed. The donations included his endowment church, the villages of Leštije, Mutnica Donja, Brestnica, Zubarije, Nevidovo in Zastruma, and horses, sheep, swine, in order to make that monastery domain economically independent. This shows that his feudal domain was rich, also in population.

The Vukoslavić domain was recognized by Lazar of Moravian Serbia, and Lazar and Crep became near friends, with Lazar calling him his brother and building the Ravanica Monastery in the province of Petrus in 1375–1377. The region was a popular monastic destination with the tenure of Patriarch Jefrem. At some point, the feudal domain was parceled, with Crep building a fortress at the Čokoća hill where he settled, around 1380. He built a church above the Crnica river, known as Blaga Marija (or Magdalena Petruška), before 1389. His brother Držman became a monk and took the monastic name Dionisije. Crep is known in the Serbian chronicles as a vojvoda (general). The valley of Velika Morava was intensively populated especially in the 1360s, and as a result, the župa of Dubravnica became part of the Petrus krajište (military frontier administrative unit) following the administrative reorganization and dissolvement of the župa of Pomoravlje, having constituted its northern parts (while its southern parts likely became a krajište based in Lipovac Fortress and Bolvan).

Crep, as the vlastelin-krajišnik (military governor) of Petrus, and the unnamed vlastelin-krajišnik of Lipovac, stopped an Ottoman invasion in the winter of 1380/1381 at the field of Dubravnica near Petrus, in the Battle of Dubravnica. The Serbian chronicles name his fellow vojvoda as Vitomir. It is undecided in historiography whether Crep fell at the Battle of Kosovo (1389) against the invading Ottomans alongside his master, Lazar. Crep had a daughter, nun Anisija, and son, monk Venedikt, and it is unknown whether his brother had any children; with this, the Vukoslavić noble family dissolved. Anisija lived at the Athonite monastery of St. Paul and died in 1426/1427.

Venedikt Crepović was an influential religious figure in the Serbian Despotate, and he is first mentioned in 1411 by Despot Stefan Lazarević in a Hilandar chrysobull. The chrysobull settled a decades-long ownership dispute, with priest Venedikt being returned the Lešje monastery from the Hilandar domain. In 1412, the Panegyric (Serbian: Panegirik) was written at Lešje (Leštanska pustinja) by hieromonk Jovan at the order of Despot Stefan. In 1413, the Ottoman prince Musa Çelebi devastated Petrus. Venedikt and inok Jakov translated John Chrysostom's works. In late 1452, Venedikt was part of the delegation, along with metropolitan Mihailo of Raška-Prizren, sent by Despot Đurađ Branković that brought St. Luke's relics from Epirus to Smederevo on 12 January 1453. Some experts attribute the commentary to the event, survived in a manuscript written 1453–1456 held at the Patriarchal library, to Venedikt. Venedikt served as the Metropolitan of Gračanica-Novo Brdo before 1455, when the Ottoman conquered Novo Brdo. The exiled Venedikt received the life-long administration of the Vraćevšnica monastery in 1456, but in 1459 fled to St. Paul's on Mount Athos where he died.

== Members ==
- Crep (d. 1328–1331), župan.
  - Vukoslav (fl. 1331–1360), župan of Petrus.
    - Crep Vukoslavić (fl. 1380–1381), vlastelin-krajišnik (military governor) of Petrus.
      - Venedikt Crepović (b. 1381–fl. 1459), monk, priest (kyr), metropolitan.
      - Anisija (d. 1426/1427), Orthodox nun, lived at the Athonite monastery of St. Paul.
    - Držman, became monk Dionisije.

== Sources ==
- Bojković, Gordan (2024). "Contribution to the studies of the Krajišta of the medieval Serbia: Krajišta of Petruš and Lipovac". Bastina (63). Centre for Evaluation in Education and Science (CEON/CEES): 331–337. doi:10.5937/bastina34-51487. ISSN 0353-9008.
- Jašović, Predrag; Petković, Đorđe (2007). "Petruška vlastela i kosovskometohijski duhovni prostor". Baština (in Serbian) (22): 89–103. ISSN 0353-9008.
- Mišić, Siniša (2010). Петрушко и Липовачко крајиште од половине XIV века до 1459. године. Расин. ан. (in Serbian). 8: 121–128.
- Štetić, Marina (2016). "Алексиначки крај у средњем веку". Алексинац и околина у прошлости, 500 година од првог писаног помена 1516–2016, зборник радова са међународног научног скупа одржаног 3. септембра 2016. године у Алексинцу (in Serbian). Завичајни музеј Алексинац. pp. 49–63. ISBN 978-86-917433-6-9.
