= Historical Museum of Serbia =

History museum in Belgrade, Serbia

Serbian Historical Museum
- Српски историјски музеј

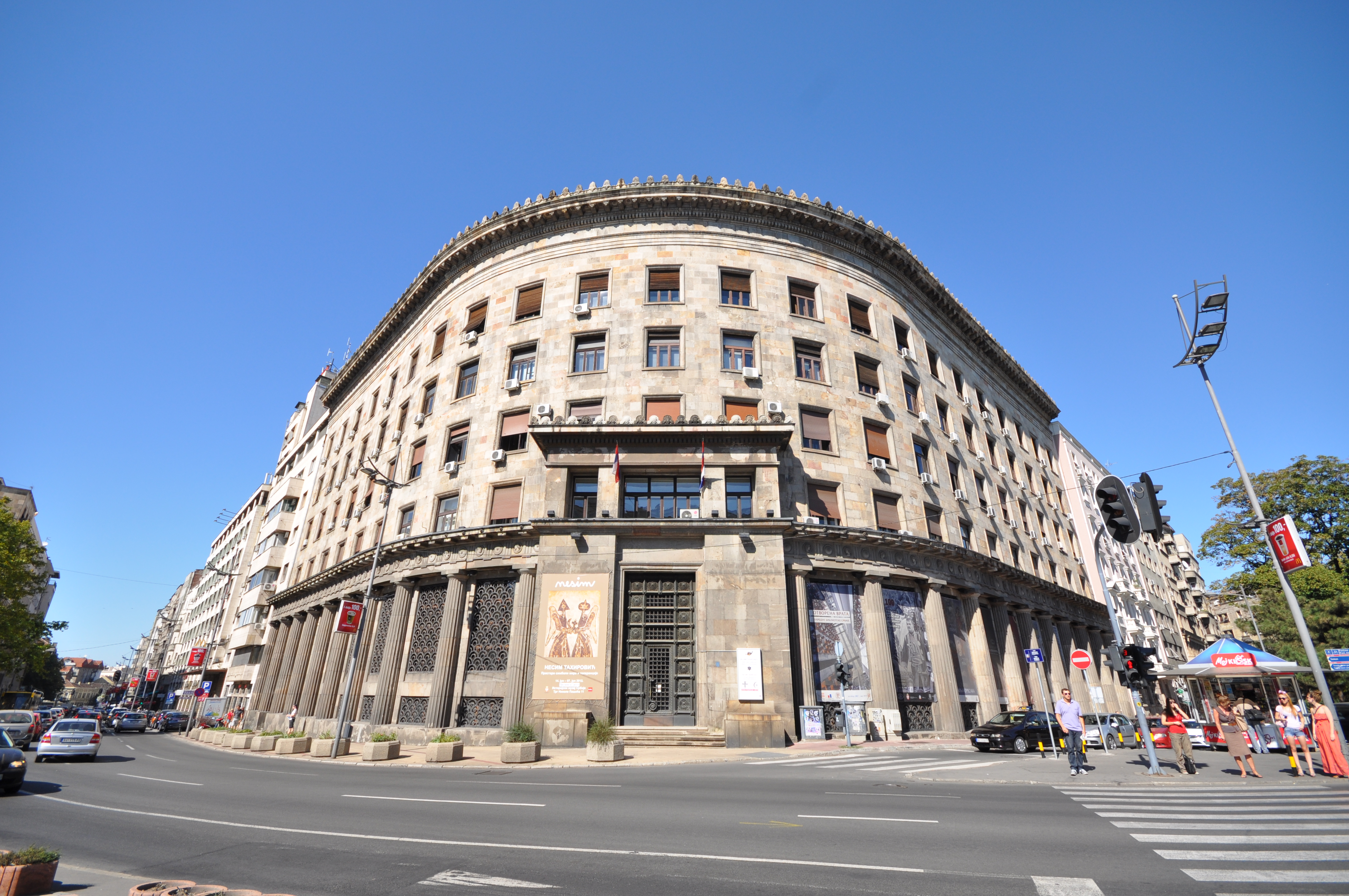
- Established: 20 February 1963; 63 years ago
- Location: Trg Nikole Pašića 11, Belgrade
- Coordinates: 44.8125°N 20.4637°E
- Director: Acting Director Zorica Janković
- Owner: Government of Serbia

The Serbian Historical Museum (Serbian: Српски историјски музеј / Srpski istorijski muzej), known until 2026 as the Historical Museum of Serbia (Историјски музеј Србије / Istorijski muzej Srbije, IMUS), is a public institution dedicated to documentation of the history of Serbia from prehistory up to the present. The museum was established in 1963 and today preserves more than 50,000 objects organised in 25 collections and 6 funds. Over the years the museum was located at different locations around the capital city of Belgrade. Its main exhibition space is at Trg Nikole Pašića 11, and the museum also manages the Residence of Prince Miloš in Topčider and the Serbian House on the Greek island of Corfu. In 2020, as a part of the Belgrade Waterfront development project, the museum was granted the historical building of the Belgrade Main railway station as its new permanent base. The museum is one of the leading institutions of its kind in the city and the country.

== History ==
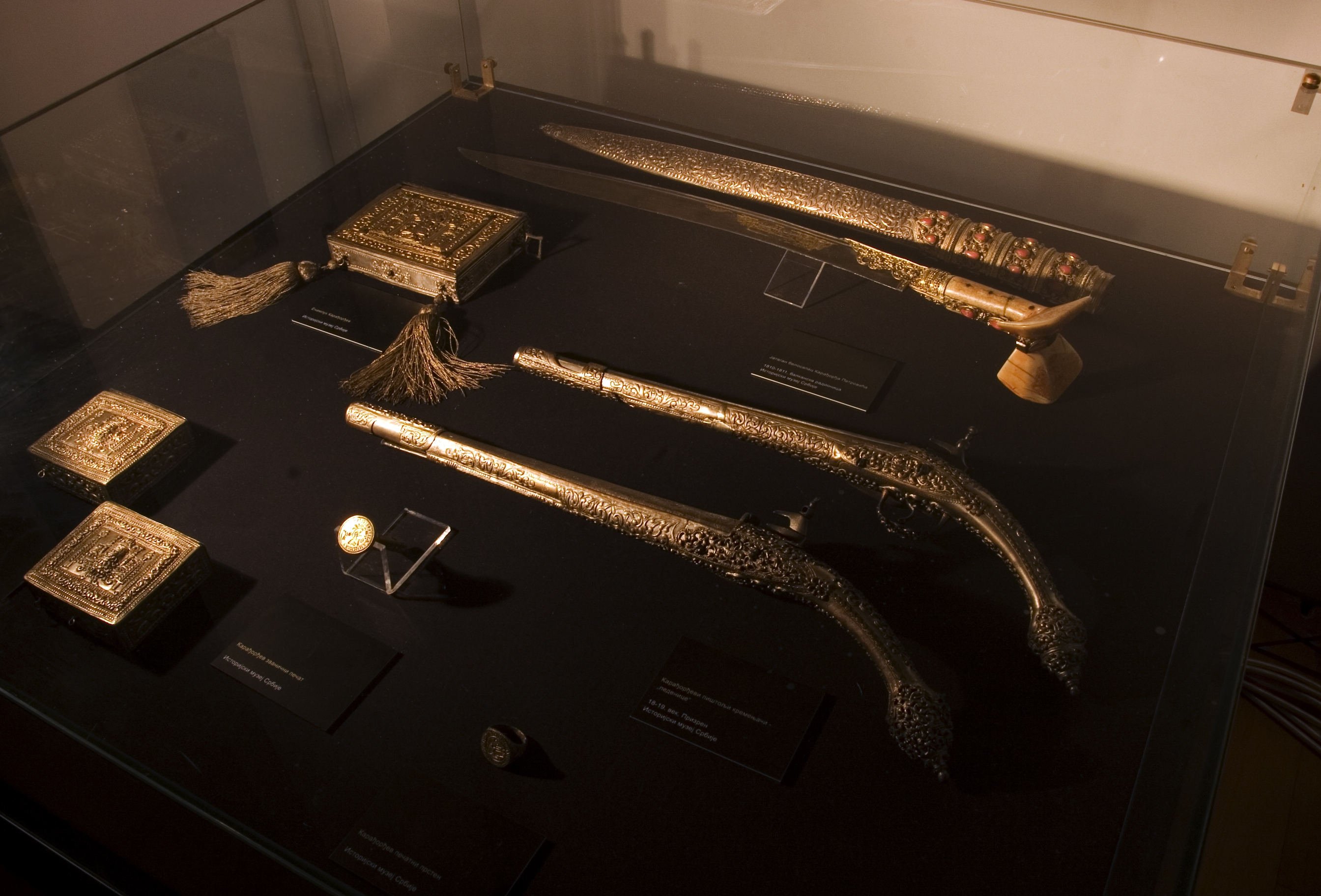
18th and early 19th century Serbian weapons on display

The first unsuccessful initiative to establish the museum was taken in 1950 with the enactment of the Decree on the establishment of the History Museum of the People's Republic of Serbia. The proposal was reinitiated in 1954 with the establishment of the Serbian Revolution Museum (hosted by the Residence of Prince Miloš) commemorating the 150th anniversary of the First Serbian Uprising.

The Historical Museum of Serbia was established by the decision of the People's Republic of Serbia authorities on 20 February 1963 with the new institution absorbing the Serbian Revolution Museum. The task of the Museum was defined in 1966 as follows: ″to collect, record, store, arrange, study and exhibit material from the history of the Serbian people and Serbia from the earliest times to the present day″.

Until 2003 the museum published the scientific journal Zbornik Istorijskog muzeja Srbije. Initially, from 1954 to 1965, it was published by the Serbian Revolution Museum.

In November 2020 the Serbian government made the decision to relocate the museum to a far bigger building, which formerly served as Belgrade Main railway station.

In September 2026 the Government of Serbia changed the museum’s name from the Historical Museum of Serbia to the Serbian Historical Museum. The decision was adopted at a government session on 3 September and published in the Official Gazette on 4 September 2026.

== See also ==
- List of museums in Serbia
- Institute for Recent History of Serbia
