= Institute of History Belgrade =

Serbian Historical society

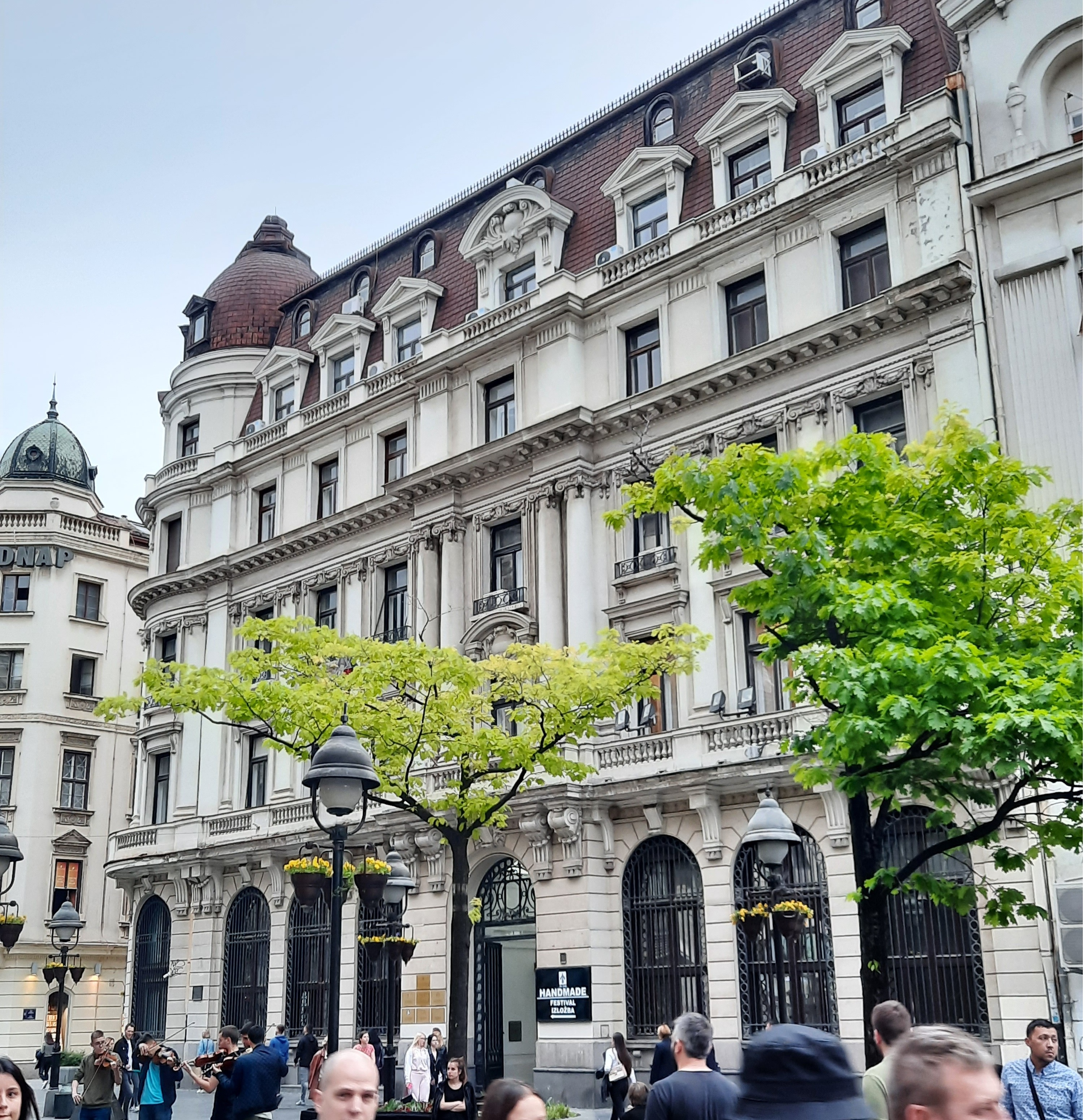

The Institute of History (Serbian: Istorijski Institut) is a Serbian historical society dedicated to historical research covering the Middle Ages to the establishment of the Kingdom of Serbs, Croats and Slovenes in 1918. The institute was founded on 15 July 1947, in Belgrade, under the director Viktor Novak, and deputy director of Georgy Ostrogorski. The institute was part of the Serbian Academy of Sciences and Arts until 1961, when it became independent.

== Directors ==
- Viktor Novak (1947–1954)
- Ilija Sindik (1954–1958)
- Mita Kostic (1958–1961)
- Jorjo Tadic (1961–1969)
- Relja Novaković (1969–1973)
- Danica Milić (1973–1987)
- Slavenko Terzić (1987–2002)
- Tibor Živković (2002–2010)
- Srđan Rudić (2010–2019)
- Aleksandar Rastović (2019–present)

== Publications ==
The institute publishes academic journals, such as Istorijski Časopis (Historical Review)

== See also ==
- Institute for Recent History of Serbia
