= Slobodan Antonić =

Serbian political scientist, sociologist (born 1959)

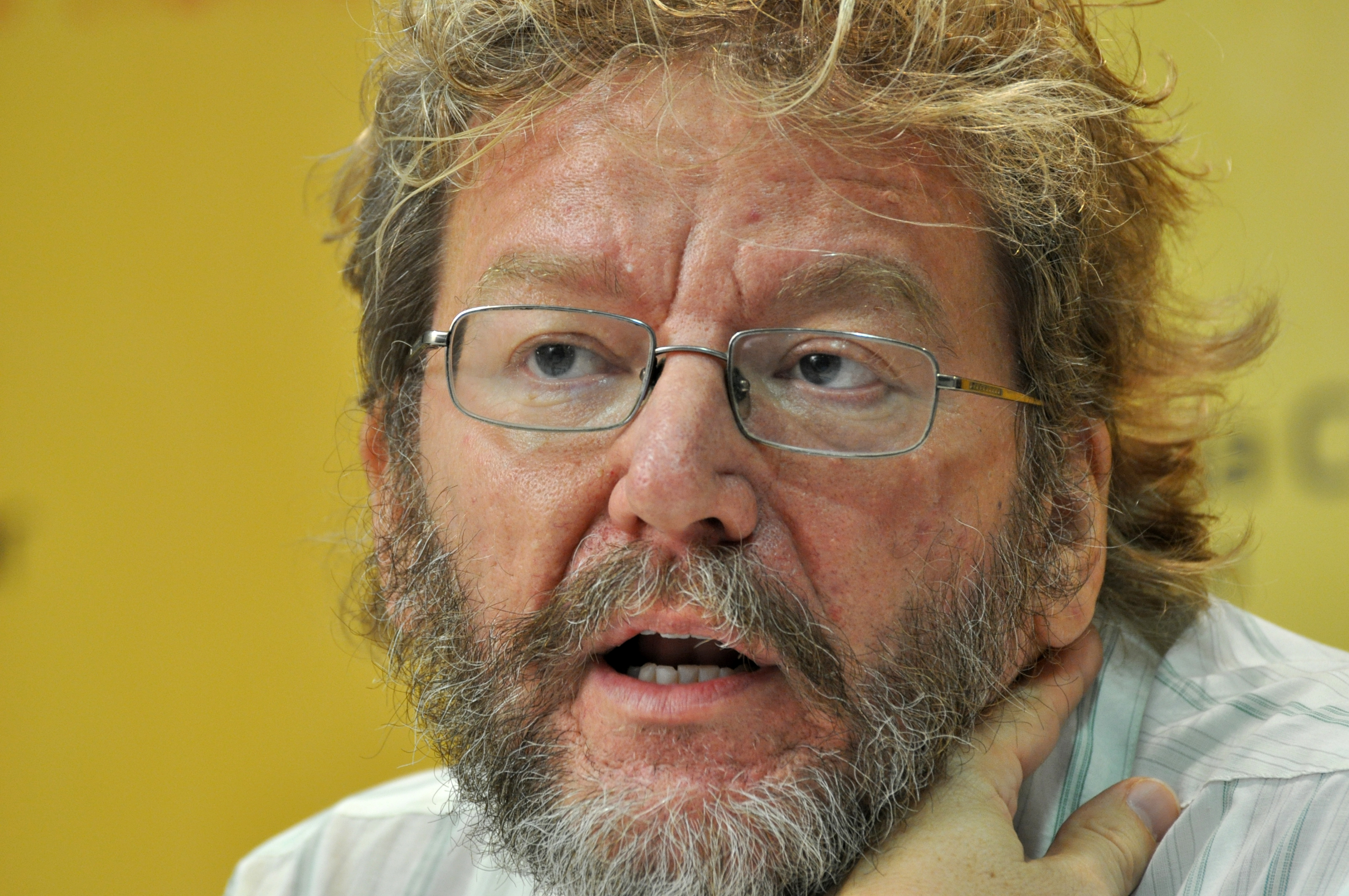
- Born: 19 May 1959; Belgrade, PR Serbia, FPR Yugoslavia
- Scientific career
- Fields: Sociology; Political science
- Workplaces: University of Belgrade

Slobodan Antonić (Serbian Cyrillic: Слободан Антонић; born 19 May 1959) is a Serbian political scientist, sociologist and university professor.

== Biography ==
Antonić was born in 1959 in Belgrade which at that time was a part of the Socialist Federal Republic of Yugoslavia. He graduated in 1982 and received his master's degree in 1988 from the Faculty of Political Sciences at the University of Belgrade on the topic Contribution to the Critique of Historical Materialism as a Philosophy of History. He prepared and defended his doctoral dissertation on Theoretical and Methodological Problems of Studying the Evolution of Suburban Societies at the Department of Sociology of the Faculty of Philosophy in Belgrade in 1995, where he teaches general sociology, power theory and contemporary political theory.

He worked as a researcher at the Institute for Political Studies in Belgrade (1990–1996), taught sociology at the Faculty of Philosophy in Novi Sad (1996–2001), and since 2001 has been employed at the Department of Sociology at the Faculty of Philosophy in Belgrade (assistant professor 2001, associate professor). professor 2006, full professor 2011). He was the head of the Department of Sociology (2006–2010), the editor-in-chief of the Sociological Review (2006–2009) and the president of the Serbian Sociological Society (2009–2013). He is one of the founders (1994) and editor of the New Serbian Political Thought, which published three of his books and tens of articles.

He was a columnist for the daily newspaper Politika, where he mostly wrote about political topics. He was also involved in a controversy with Serbian historian Dubravka Stojanović. Antonić criticised Stojanović's scientific conclusions about the role of the Serbian quisling forces in The Holocaust in German-occupied Serbia and considered her work on the subject to be meet the criteria of historical revisionism. Antonić criticized Stojanović's claim about prominent role local Serbian collaborationists played in Holocaust in Serbia accusing her of "revisionist" transfer of responsibility from Nazi German occupiers to the local Serbian forces.

As of 2022, he has contributed to Serbian branch of RT, a Russian state-owned propaganda network.

== Political views ==
In 2015, Slobodan Antonić released the book "It is Not Over Yet: Milošević" (Serbian: Још није готово: Милошевић, romanized: Još nije gotovo: Milošević), about at the former Yugoslav president Slobodan Milošević. In April 2022, Antonić signed a petition calling for Serbia not to impose sanctions on Russia after it invaded Ukraine.

== Books ==
- Serbia Between Populism and Democracy, IPS, Belgrade (1993)
- Challenges of Historical Sociology, Belgrade (1995)
- Antonić, Slobodan, "Party and Social Divisions in Montenegro". Sociology: Journal of Sociology, Social Psychology and Social Anthropology. 41 (2): 165—186 (1999)
- Captive Country: Serbia for the Government of Slobodan Milošević, Belgrade (2002)
- The Nation in the Currents of the Past: Essays on the Sustainability of Democracy in Serbia, Čigoja, Belgrade (2003)
- Swallowing Frogs, (2005)
- Elite, Citizenship and the Weak State: Serbia after 2000, (2006)
- Serbs and "Euro-Serbs", (2007)
- Consolidation of Democratic Institutions in Serbia after 2000, (2007, co-author Dušan Pavlović)
- Weimar Serbia, (2008)
- Cultural War in Serbia: Slobodan Antonić, (2008)
- The Temptations of Radical Feminism: The Power and Limits of Social Engineering, (2011)
- Vichy Serbia, (2011)
- Transitional Locusts: Conceptual Confrontations 2008-2011, (2011)
- The Devil, History and Feminism: Sociological Adventures, (2012)
- Bad Infinity: Contributions to the Sociology of Serbian Society, (2012)
- On Brussels Rails: Political Analysis, (2013)
- Power and Sexuality: The Sociology of the Gay Movement, (2014)
- Dossier of the Autonomous Province of Vojvodina, (2014). (co-author)
- It is Not Over Yet: Milošević, (2015)
- Dismantling of Culture: Contributions to the Sociology of Serbian Society, (2016)
- Moć i poslušnost (2022)
- Ukrajinski rat: buđenje carstva (2023)
- Colonial (anti)education (2024)
- Neokolonijalizam i inverzni nacionalizam: slučaj Srbije (2025)
