= Branko Petranović =

Serbian historian and university professor

- Born: 31 October 1927; Cetinje, Kingdom of SCS
- Died: 17 June 1994 (aged 66); Belgrade, Serbia, FR Yugoslavia
- Citizenship: Serbian
- Education: Belgrade University
- Scientific career
- Fields: Historian

Branko Petranović (31 October 1927 — 17 June 1994) was a Serbian historian and a Belgrade University professor specializing in history of Yugoslavia.

== Career ==
Branko Petranović was born in Cetinje, Kingdom of Serbs, Croats and Slovenes. Primary and secondary school education he finished in Kotor, Cetinje and Belgrade. From January 1944 he joined Tito's partisans. He finished undergraduate studies at Belgrade University: at the Faculty of Law in 1950 and at the Faculty of Philosophy in 1956. From 1958 he dedicated himself to historiography and started his academic career as a researcher at the History Department of the Institute of Social Sciences (May 1958-August 1963). He earned his PhD degree at the Belgrade University Faculty of Law in 1962. As a researcher he worked at the Department for the History of the Yugoslav Workers' Movement of the Workers' Movement Research Institute in Belgrade (September 1963-January 1969) and the Institute of Contemporary History (January–November 1969). From 1969, he was an associate professor and from 1975 a full professor at the Belgrade University Faculty of Philosophy, Department of History. Petranović was also a member of editorial and advisory boards of numerous historical journals and anthologies (Istorija XX veka, Istorijski glasnik, Vojnoistorijski glasnik, Jugoslovenski istorijski časopis, etc.).

During his academic career he advised 28 MSc and 19 PhD students.

Petranović never retired. He died on 17 June 1994 and was buried in Belgrade.

== Historiography ==
Petranović published 32 books in 38 volumes, 314 scientific papers in conferences proceedings and scientific journals and 259 surveys in scientific journals. He authored two TV documentaries dedicated to the history of Yugoslavia. He was a 20th-century historian who Yugoslav and foreign academics dedicated 296 articles to. His academic archives, found after his death, were source for additional six books (out of which one was published in the United States) and ten new scientific papers.

He contributed to the transformation of the Yugoslav Communist Party institutions from party services into serious research institutes. As a historian he fought against fanaticism, fatalism, and taboo creation in historiography i.e. fought against historian being a privileged liar of the rulers.

Most his academic research and career was dedicated to the 20th century epoch and to Yugoslavia. Historian Ljubodrag Dimić, in his Foreword to Branko Petranović: The Yugoslav Experience of Serbian National Integration, stressed that the twentieth century epoch in Yugoslavia was not inclined to the historian, especially not to the one who was trying to gain rational knowledge about the history of the Yugoslav state and society. In the first years following the Second World War, ideological and political conditions were not favorable for the study of history. The knowledge of history was considered to be unnecessary and, quite often, undesirable. The interests of the revolution, the people, the state and the working class were colliding with the postulates of the profession. These, for a historian, unfavorable social conditions were something he faced and understood as a dictature. Even when his works were influenced by the ruling communist ideology and its phraseology, the same works provided numerous insights into main problems of the historic development of Yugoslav state. As a historian, he was led by his principle stating that a historian cannot dedicate himself to the history of his times without confronting his own work and results to other historians research.

He thought that the disintegration of socialist Yugoslavia was a tragic event and, as a historian, he tried to thoroughly examine the multiple causes hidden behind the politics which led to the disintegration of both iterations of the nation. He stated that Yugoslavia was the only state keeping all Serbs inside the same state and that both iterations disintegrated due to the fact that they were dictatorships with no democratic alternative. He stated that the dictatorships weren't able to counter taboos, religious intolerance and divisions, the uneven economic development of Yugoslav regions, and the influence and interest of great powers.

His overall research can be summarized by the twentieth century themes

- Kingdom of Yugoslavia
- History of Serbia in WWII
- Communist Yugoslavia
- WWII resistance movement in Europe
- role of a historian in contemporary epoch

Petranović influenced a group of his students who became later historians at Belgrade University: Ljubodrag Dimić, Desanka Pešić, Latinka Perović, for example. He advised his graduate students not to be historians of a single subject, rather historians of a century. He taught his students to think about a single event as an event in the context of the world history process within local environment.

== Selected works ==
- Petranović, Branko (1964). Političke i pravne prilike za vreme privremene vlade DFJ. Beograd: Institut društvenih nauka.
- Petranović, Branko (1969). Politička i ekonomska osnova narodne vlasti u Jugoslaviji za vreme obnove. Beograd: Institut za savremenu istoriju.
- Petranović, Branko (1976). AVNOJ - revolucionarna smena vlasti 1942-1945. Beograd: Nolit.
- Petranović, Branko; Štrbac, Čedomir (1977). Istorija socijalističke Jugoslavije. Vol. 1. Beograd: Radnička štampa.
- Petranović, Branko; Štrbac, Čedomir (1977). Istorija socijalističke Jugoslavije. Vol. 2. Beograd: Radnička štampa.
- Petranović, Branko; Štrbac, Čedomir (1977). Istorija socijalističke Jugoslavije. Vol. 3. Beograd: Radnička štampa.
- Petranović, Branko; Simović, Vojislav (1979). Istorija narodne vlasti u Jugoslaviji (1941-1945). Beograd: Savremena administracija.
- Petranović, Branko (1980). Istorija Jugoslavije 1918-1978. Beograd: Nolit.
- Petranović, Branko (1981). Jugoslovenske vlade u izbeglištvu 1943-1945: Dokumenti. Beograd: Arhiv Jugoslavije.
- Petranović, Branko (1983). Revolucija i kontrarevolucija u Jugoslaviji (1941-1945). Vol. 1. Beograd: Rad.
- Petranović, Branko (1983). Revolucija i kontrarevolucija u Jugoslaviji (1941-1945). Vol. 2. Beograd: Rad.
- Nešović, Slobodan; Petranović, Branko (1983). AVNOJ i revolucija: Tematska zbirka dokumenata 1941-1945. Beograd: Narodna knjiga.
- Petranović, Branko (1984). Istoriografija i revolucija. Beograd: Prosveta.
- Petranović, Branko; Zečević, Momčilo (1985). Jugoslavija 1918-1984: Zbirka dokumenata. Beograd: Rad.
- Nešović, Slobodan; Petranović, Branko (1985). Jugoslavija i Ujedinjeni narodi 1941-1945. Beograd: Narodna knjiga.
- Petranović, Branko (1985). Revolucije i pokreti otpora u Evropi 1939-1945. Skopje: Zavod za unapreduvanje na stopanstvoto.
- Petranović, Branko; Zečević, Momčilo (1987). Jugoslovenski federalizam: Ideje i stvarnost. Vol. 1. Beograd: Prosveta. ISBN 9788607001873.
- Petranović, Branko; Zečević, Momčilo (1987). Jugoslovenski federalizam: Ideje i stvarnost. Vol. 2. Beograd: Prosveta.
- Petranović, Branko (1988). Istorija Jugoslavije 1918-1988. Vol. 1. Beograd: Nolit.
- Petranović, Branko (1988). Istorija Jugoslavije 1918-1988. Vol. 2. Beograd: Nolit.
- Petranović, Branko (1988). Istorija Jugoslavije 1918-1988. Vol. 3. Beograd: Nolit.
- Petranović, Branko; Zečević, Momčilo (1988). Jugoslavija 1918-1988: Tematska zbirka dokumenata. Beograd: Rad. ISBN 9788609001086.
- Petranović, Branko (1991). Balkanska federacija 1943-1948. Šabac: Zaslon.
- Petranović, Branko; Zečević, Momčilo (1991). Agonija dve Jugoslavije. Šabac: Zaslon.
- Petranović, Branko (1992). Srbija u drugom svetskom ratu 1939-1945. Beograd: Vojnoizdavački i novinski centar. Archived from the original on 2015-04-01.
- Петрановић, Бранко (1993). Југословенско искуство српске националне интеграције. Београд: Службени лист СРЈ. ISBN 9788635501741.
- Петрановић, Бранко (1994). Историчар и савремена епоха. Београд: Војска.
- Petranović, Branko (2002). The Yugoslav Experience of Serbian National Integration. Boulder: East European Monographs. ISBN 9780880334846.
