= Aleksandar Rastović =

Serbian historian, university professor and politician

Aleksandar Rastović (Serbian Cyrillic: Александар Растовић; born 20 January 1969) is a Serbian historian, university professor and politician. In academia, he specializes in the relations between Britain and Serbia from the 19th to early 20th centuries.

== Early life and education ==
Rastović was born on 20 January 1969 in Zemun, Belgrade, SR Serbia, SFR Yugoslavia. He graduated from the Zemun Gymnasium and the Faculty of Philosophy at the University of Belgrade. He obtained his master's degree in 1999 at the Faculty of Philosophy in Belgrade on the subject Great Britain and Serbia 1878-1889. He defended his PhD dissertation on the subject Great Britain and Serbia 1903-1914 in 2003 at the Faculty of Philosophy in Belgrade.

== Academic career ==
From 1994 to 2008, he worked at the Institute of History Belgrade. He was engaged in the project of the Institute of History titled Between European Models and Stereotypes: Serbian National Integration 1804-1918 and is one of the authors of the Serbian Biographical Dictionary and the Serbian Encyclopedia. He was the president of the board of directors of the National Museum in Užice and a member of the board of directors of the Institute for Contemporary History in Belgrade.

He is the president of the board of directors of the Archives of Serbia, member of the board of directors of the Institute of History, member of the 20th century history committee of the Serbian Academy of Sciences and Arts and a member of the social sciences committee of Matica Srpska. Since 2016, he was a scientific advisor to the Institute of History in Belgrade and since 2019 he has been serving as the director of the institute.

From 2006 to 2007, he was engaged as a lecturer in the subject General History of the New Century II at the Faculty of Philosophy of the University of Priština (North Mitrovica). From 2008 to 2016, he worked at the Faculty of Philosophy at the University of Niš, where he was elected assistant professor, part-time and full-time professor. He teaches at the Diplomatic Academy of the Ministry of Foreign Affairs of the Republic of Serbia.

== Political activities ==
Rastović is a member of the Socialist Party of Serbia (SPS). He served as the president of party's youth wing and is now a member of SPS's main board. He was the Deputy Federal Minister for Refugees, Displaced Persons and Humanitarian Aid of FR Yugoslavia under the prime minister Momir Bulatović from 1999 to 2000. Rastović was a special advisor to the minister of education, science and technological development from 2013 to 2014.

== Selected works ==
- Велика Британија и Србија 1878–1889, Belgrade, 2000.
- Велика Британија и Србија 1903–1914, Belgrade, 2005.
- Парламентарне странке у Краљевини СХС-Југославији. Настанак, развој и партијски системи, I–II, Belgrade and Mitrovica, 2007–2008.
- Велика Британија и македонско питање 1903–1908. године, Belgrade, 2011.
- Енглези и Балкан 1837–1914, Belgrade, 2015.
- Велика Британија и Косовски вилајет 1877–1912, Belgrade, 2015.
- Дневник из Првог светског рата, Momčilo Jerotić. Belgrade, 2017.
- Стојан Новаковић, Изабрана документа. Edited by A. Rastović, B. Katić Miljković,, B. Stojić, J. Blažić Pejić, Belgrade, 2017.
- Срби о Рајсу, Vol. 5. Edited by A. Rastović, I. Krstić Mistridželović, R. Samardžić, Belgrade, 2019.
- Разнолики историјски списи 1–5. Milorad Ekmečić; edited by P. V. Krestić. A. Rastović, Novi Sad, 2021.
- Народна скупштина: огледало воље народа Србије. A. Rastović, M. Roter Blagojević, I. Borozan, Novi Sad and Belgrade, 2022.
- Британски интелектуалци о српском и југословенском питању. Пример Роберта Ситона Вотсона, Belgrade, 2023.
- Milan Đ. Milićević, Дневник IV, 1. април 1882 - 31. децембар 1891 [Diary IV, 1 April 1882 – 31 December 1891]. Edited by A. Rastović, Belgrade, 2024.
