= Ljubodrag Dimić =

Serbian historian

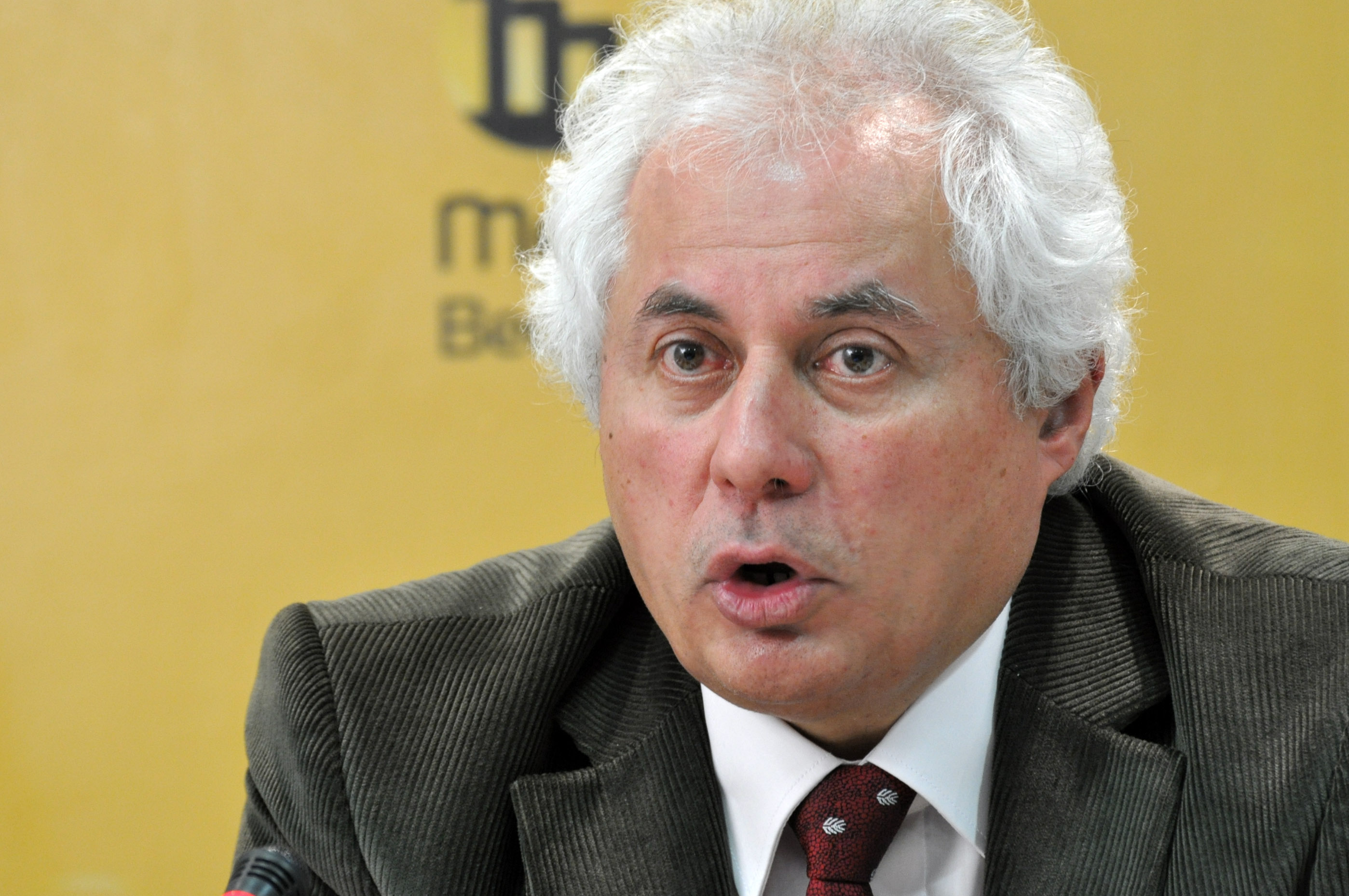
- Born: 20 February 1956 (age 70)
- Education: University of Belgrade PhD
- Occupations: Historian; Professor

Ljubodrag Dimić (Serbian Cyrillic: Љубодраг Димић; 20 February 1956 in Zemun) is a Serbian historian, university professor and since 2012 member of Serbian Academy of Sciences and Arts. His primary fields of study are: history of former Yugoslavia, history of the Cold War, modern political, social and cultural history of Serbia and contemporary national history of Serbian people.

== Biography ==
Ljubodrag Dimić was born in 1956, in Zemun, part of Belgrade, capital of Serbia and former Yugoslavia. He graduated history at the University of Belgrade Faculty of Philosophy in (1980), completed master studies in (1985) ("Agitprop phase of cultural policy in Serbia 1945-1952") and doctoral studies in (1993) ("Cultural Policy in the Kingdom of Yugoslavia 1929-1941"). Since 1981 he worked as an assistant researcher in Institute for recent history of Serbia in Belgrade. In 1985 he was transferred to the History Department of Faculty of Philosophy (University of Belgrade) where he worked as an assistant professor, and since 1998 as a professor, holding the char for the History of Yugoslavia. From 2003 to 2005 he was the head of the History Department.

Since 2001 he led the "Commission for Truth and Reconciliation" founded by the President of Federal Republic of Yugoslavia. He is member of the Board for the 20th century history (Serbian Academy of Sciences and Arts). He is also one of the founders of the Center for Contemporary History of Southeastern Europe, and head of the Center for History of Yugoslavia and the Cold War. He is member of editorial boards of several historical journals. He is also an honorary member of The Cold War Studies Centre of the London School of Economics and Political Science.

He studied and conducted research work in London, Prague, Braunschweig, Moscow, Ekaterinburg and Paris. He participated in the work of various of scientific conferences in Serbia and abroad. He is author of several books, editor of several volumes of historical material, writer of history textbooks, and also the author of more than 220 scientific papers. In 2012 he was elected corresponding member Serbian Academy of Sciences and Arts.

== Bibliography ==
Main works:

- Dimić, Ljubodrag (1988). Agitprop kultura: Agitpropovska faza kulturne politike u Srbiji 1945-1952. Beograd: Rad.
- Dimić, Ljubodrag; Žutić, Nikola (1992). Rimokatolički klerikalizam u Kraljevini Jugoslaviji 1918-1941: Prilozi za istoriju. Beograd: Vojnoizdavački i novinski centar.
- Станковић, Ђорђе; Димић, Љубодраг (1996). Историографија под надзором: Прилози историји историографије. Vol. 1. Београд: Службени лист СРЈ. ISBN 9788635503158.
- Станковић, Ђорђе; Димић, Љубодраг (1996). Историографија под надзором: Прилози историји историографије. Vol. 2. Београд: Службени лист. ISBN 9788635503189.
- Димић, Љубодраг (1996). Културна политика у Краљевини Југославији 1918-1941. Vol. 1. Београд: Стубови културе.
- Димић, Љубодраг (1997). Културна политика у Краљевини Југославији 1918-1941. Vol. 2. Београд: Стубови културе.
- Димић, Љубодраг (1997). Културна политика у Краљевини Југославији 1918-1941. Vol. 3. Београд: Стубови културе.
- Димић, Љубодраг (1998). Срби и Југославија: Простор, друштво, политика (Поглед с краја века). Београд: Стубови културе.
- Димић, Љубодраг; Борозан, Ђорђе (1998). Југословенска држава и Албанци. Vol. 1. Београд: Службени лист СРЈ, Архив Југославије, Војно-историјски институт. ISBN 9788635504094.
- Димић, Љубодраг; Борозан, Ђорђе (1999). Југословенска држава и Албанци. Vol. 2. Београд: Службени лист СРЈ, Архив Југославије, Војно-историјски институт. ISBN 9788635504407.
- Димић, Љубодраг; Тешић, Владета; Павловић-Лазаревић, Гордана (2000). Министарство просвете и министри Краљевине Срба, Хрвата и Словенаца и Краљевине Југославије 1918-1941. Београд: Педагошки музеј. ISBN 9789547520714.
- Димић, Љубодраг (2001). Историја српске државности. Vol. 3. Нови Сад: Огранак САНУ.
- Димић, Љубодраг; Стојановић, Дубравка; Јовановић, Мирослав (2005). Србија 1804-2004: Три виђења или позив на дијалог. Београд: Удружење за друштвену историју.
- Dimić, Ljubodrag; Životić, Aleksandar (2012). Napukli monolit: Jugoslavija i svet 1942-1948. Beograd: Arhipelag, Službeni glasnik. ISBN 9788686933904.
- Богетић, Драган; Димић, Љубодраг (2013). Београдска конференција несврстаних земаља 1-6. септембра 1961.: Прилог историји Трећег света. Београд: Завод за уџбенике.
- Dimić, Ljubodrag (2014). Jugoslavija i Hladni rat: Ogledi o spoljnoj politici Josipa Broza Tita (1944-1974). Beograd: Arhipelag. ISBN 9788652301362.
- Димић, Љубодраг; Раковић, Александар; Милошевић, Миладин (2014). Југославија-Индонезија 1945-1967: Истраживања и документа. Београд: Архив Југославије.
  - Dimić, Ljubodrag; Raković, Aleksandar; Milošević, Miladin (2015). Yugoslavia-Indonesia 1945-1967: Research and documentation (PDF). Belgrade-Jakarta: Archives of Yugoslavia, National Archives of The Republic of Indonesia.
- Радојевић, Мира; Димић, Љубодраг (2014). Србија у Великом рату 1914-1918: Кратка историја. Београд: Српска књижевна задруга, Београдски форум за свет равноправних. (Serbian edition)
  - Radojević, Mira; Dimić, Ljubodrag (2014). Serbia in the Great War 1914-1918: A short History. Belgrade: Srpska književna zadruga, Belgrade forum for the world of equals. (English edition)
  - Radojević, Mira; Dimić, Ljubodrag (2014). Serbien im Großen Krieg 1914-1918. Belgrad: Srpska književna zadruga, Belgrader Forum für eine Welt von Gleichberechtigten. ISBN 9788637912774. (German edition)
  - Радојевич, Мира; Димич, Любодраг (2014). Сербия в Великой войне 1914-1918: Краткая история. Белград: Српска књижевна задруга, Белградский форум за мир равноправных. (Russian edition)
- Димић, Љубодраг; Жутић, Никола (2017). Алојзије Степинац: Држава, црква, надбискуп (1934-1941). Београд: Филип Вишњић.

=== Other works ===
- Dimić, Ljubodrag (2000). "From Assertions to Knowledge: Yugoslav Historiography Concerning the War of 1941-1945". East European Studies. 9. Seoul: 257–281.
- Dimić, Ljubodrag (2003). "Tito and Krushchev 1953-1956: Coming together, reconciliation, disappointment". Journal of Central & East European Studies. 5 (2). Seoul: 423–456.
- Dimić, Ljubodrag (2005). "Ideology and culture in Yugoslavia (1945-1955)". Velike sile i male države u hladnom ratu 1945-1955: Slučaj Jugoslavije. Beograd: Filozofski fakultet. pp. 303–320.
- Dimić, Ljubodrag (2005). "Serbien und Jugoslawien (1918-1941)". Österreichische Osthefte. 47 (1–4): 231–264. ISBN 9783825895396.
- Dimić, Ljubodrag (2005). "Influence culturelle française dans le Royaume de Yugoslavie". Српско-француски односи 1904-2004. Београд: Архив Србије. pp. 57–72.
- Dimić, Ljubodrag (2008). "Historiography on the Cold War in Yugoslavia: From Ideology to Science". Cold War History. 8 (2): 285–297. doi:10.1080/14682740802018835. S2CID 154930103.
- Dimić, Ljubodrag (2011). "Yugoslav-Soviet Relations: The View of the Western Diplomats (1944-1946)". The Balkans in the Cold War: Balkan Federations, Cominform, Yugoslav-Soviet Conflict. Beograd: Institute for Balkan Studies. pp. 109–140. ISBN 9788671790734.
- Dimić, Ljubodrag (2012). "Josip Broz Tito, Yugoslav policy and the formation of the concept of European security, 1968-1975". From Helsinki to Belgrade: the First CSCE follow-up meeting and the crisis of détente. Bonn: Bonn University Press. pp. 59–81. ISBN 9783899719383.
- Dimić, Ljubodrag (2015). "Serbian Historiography on the Great War". The Serbs and the First World War 1914-1918. Belgrade: Serbian Academy of Sciences and Arts. pp. 383–407. ISBN 9788670256590.
- Dimić, Ljubodrag (2016). "Yugoslavia and Security in Europe during the 1960s (Views, Attitudes, Initiatives)" (PDF). Токови историје (3): 9–42.
- Dimić, Ljubodrag (2017). "During modern and contemporary times" (PDF). Artistic Heritage of the Serbian People in Kosovo and Metohija: History, Identity, Vulnerability, Protection. Belgrade: Serbian Academy of Sciences and Arts. pp. 49–77.
- Dimić, Ljubodrag (2018). "Alojzije Stepinac: Student of the Collegium Germanicum (1924-1931)" (PDF). Токови историје (3): 11–32.

== See also ==
- List of Serbian historians
- List of SANU members

== Literature ==
- "Димић Љубодраг", in: Енциклопедија српске историографије (Encyclopedia of Serbian Historiography), Београд 1997, pp. 352.
