= Radivoj Radić =

Serbian historian

Radivoj Radić (born 22 January 1954) is a Serbian historian and university professor. Radić is a specialist for Byzantine studies.

He was born in Livno. Radić got his PhD at the University of Belgrade. He has published more than 300 scientific and scholarly works.

== Selected works ==
- Oblasni gospodari u Vizantiji krajem 12. i u prvim decenijama 13. veka, ZRVI 24—25. (1986), 151—290.
- Vreme Jovana V Paleologa (1332—1391), Belgrade 1993.
- Strah u poznoj Vizantiji 1180—1453, I — II, Belgrade 2000.
- Iz Carigrada u srpske zemlje, Studije iz vizantijske i srpske istorije, Belgrade 2003.
- Srbi pre Adama i posle njega, Istorija jedne zloupotrebe: Slovo protiv „novoromantičara“, Belgrade 2005. (second edition).
- Vizantija, purpur i pergament, Belgrade 2006.
- Carigrad, priče sa Bosfora, Belgrade 2007.
- Vizantija i Srbija, Belgrade 2010
- Konstantin Veliki, nadmoć hrišćanstva, Belgrade 2010.
- Romejski svet - kratka istorija svakodnevnog života u Vizantiji, Belgrade 2012.
- Stari Sloveni, Belgrade 2011.
- Srednjovekovni putovođa, Belgrade 2011.
- Strah u poznoj Vizantiji 1180—1453, Belgrade 2014.
- Drugo lice Vizantije, Belgrade 2014.
- Radić, Radivoj (2016). Klio se stidi: Protiv zlostavljanja istorijske nauke. Belgrade: Evoluta.
- Mišić, Siniša; Radić, Radivoj (2016). Srbija 1217: Nastanak kraljevine (1. ed.). Belgrade: Evoluta.
  - Mišić, Siniša; Radić, Radivoj (2017) [2016]. Srbija 1217: Nastanak kraljevine (2. ed.). Belgrade: Evoluta.
- Radić, Radivoj (2020). "Jedan zanemareni pomen Srbije i Niša iz XIII veka". Stefan Prvovenčani i njegovo doba. Belgrade: Istorijski institut. pp. 185–192.
- Radić, Radivoj (2022). "Školstvo i obrazovanje u srednjovekovnoj Srbiji" (PDF). Čitalište: Naučni časopis za teoriju i praksu bibliotekarstva. 21 (40): 51–68.
- Radić, Radivoj (2022). Istorija Trapezuntskog carstva. Belgrade: Zavod za udžbenike.
- Radić, Radivoj (2023). Otkucaji prošlosti. Crtice iz prohujalih vremena. Belgrade: Akademska knjiga.
