= Battle of Dubravnica =

1381 battle in the Balkans

- Part of the Serbian–Ottoman wars
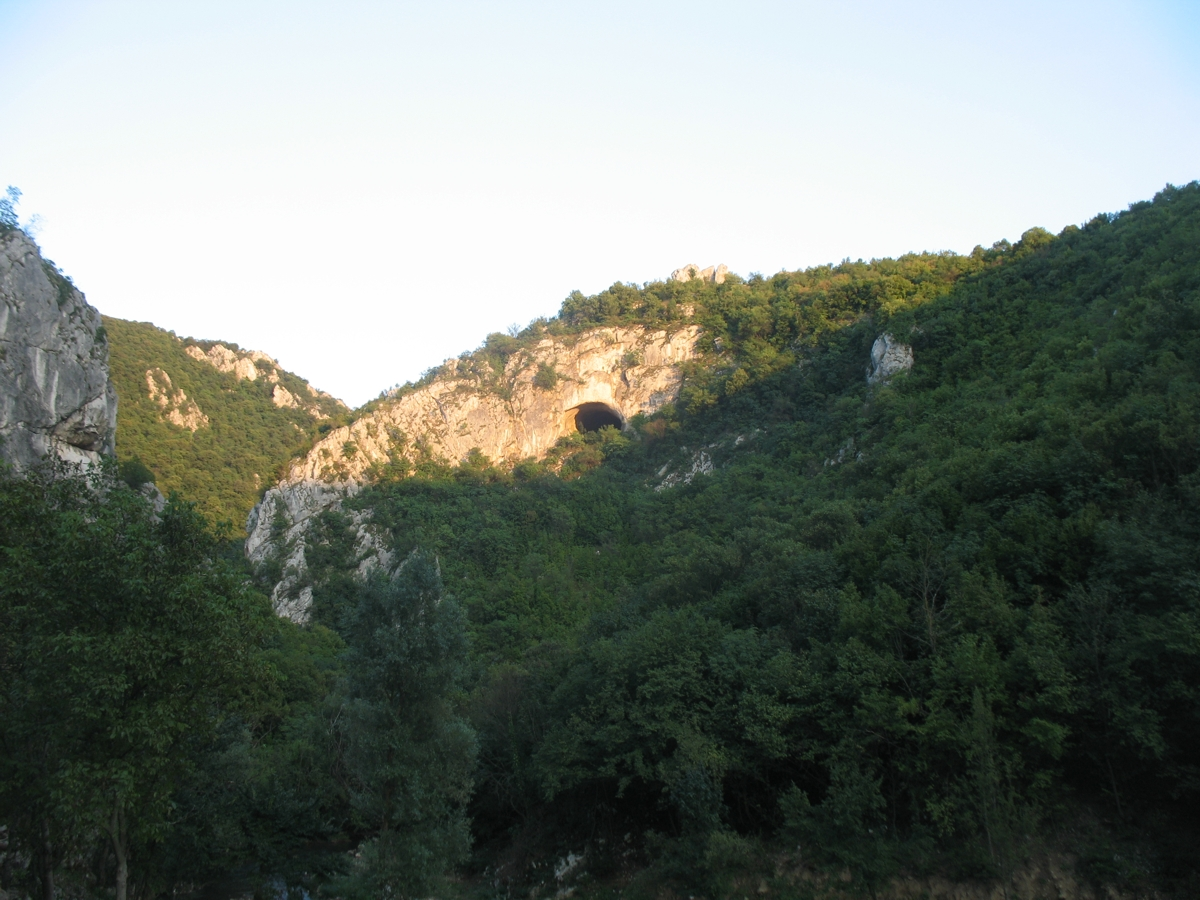
- Hills around Petrus fortress, above Dubravnica
Date	1380/1381
Location	Dubravnica near Paraćin, Serbia
Result	Serbian victory

Belligerents
Moravian Serbia	Ottoman Empire

Commanders and leaders
Vitomir; Crep Vukoslavić	(Ottoman Empire) Shahin Pasha

Strength
Unknown	Unknown

Casualties and losses
Unknown	Unknown

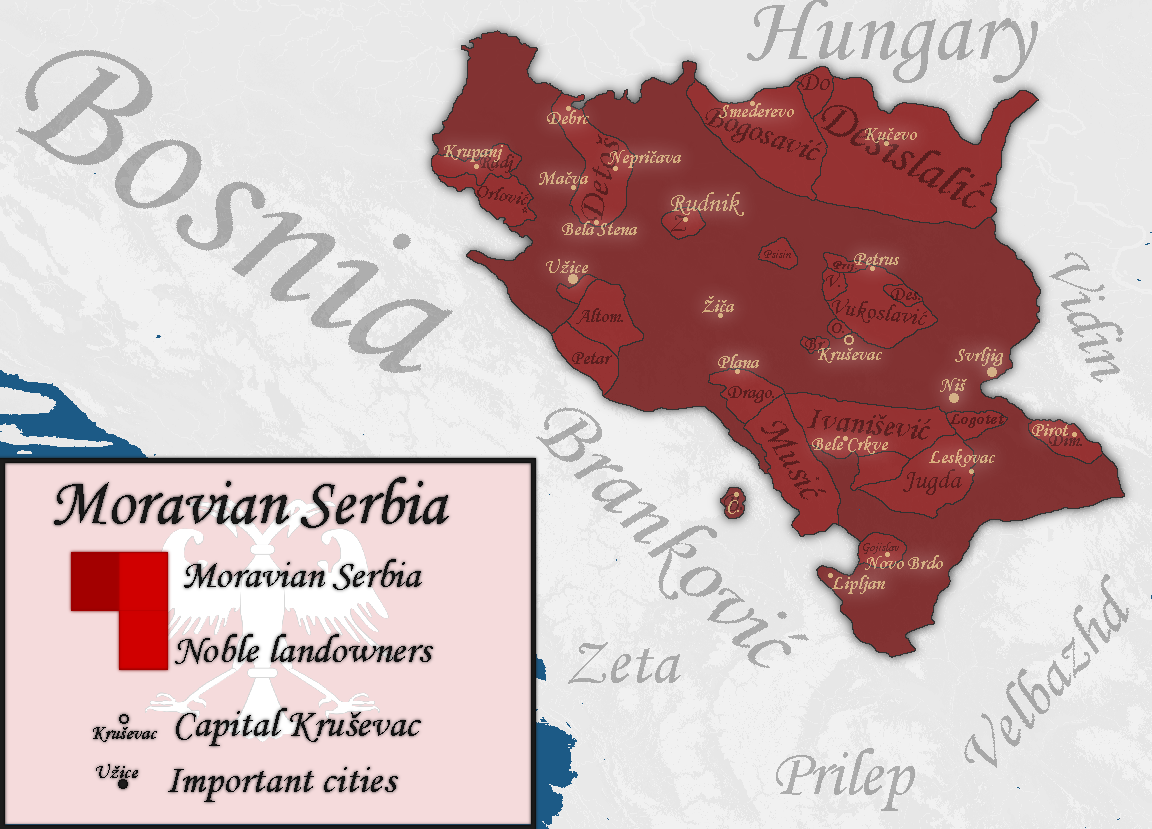
Map of Moravian Serbia under Prince Lazar

The Battle of Dubravnica was fought in the summer of 1380 or December 1381, on the Dubravnica River near Paraćin in today's central Serbia, between the Serbian forces of Prince Lazar of Serbia led by commanders Vitomir and Crep and the invading Ottoman Turks of Sultan Murad I. The battle was the first historical mention of any Turkish movements into Prince Lazar's territory. The Serbian army emerged victorious, although details of the battle itself are scarce.

"In the summer of 1380, Crep and Vitomir kills (defeats) the Turks on Dubravica"

— Lazar's chronicles

== See also ==
- Battle of Pločnik
- Battle of Bileća
- Battle of Kosovo
