= Encyclopedia of Serbian Historiography =

1997 encyclopedia by Rade Mihaljčić

The Encyclopedia of Serbian Historiography
- Author: Sima Ćirković, Rade Mihaljčić
- Original title: Енциклопедија српске историографије
- Language: Serbian
- Subject: Serbian historiography
- Publisher: Knowledge
- Publication date: 1997
- Publication place: Serbia
- Media type: Print (Hardcover)
- Pages: XVI, 741
- ISBN: 86-80269-35-2
- OCLC: 38020597
- LC Class: DR1961 .E53 1997

The Encyclopedia of Serbian Historiography is a one-volume encyclopedia on Serbian historiography, art history, literary history, ethnology and archaeology, edited by Sima Ćirković and Rade Mihaljčić.

== Structure ==
The encyclopedia features articles by more than 350 authors, divided into three parts:

Topic	Contents
The reference works	Synthetic reviews, important source editions, historical periodica, bibliographical means of orientation.
The institutions	Research institutions, archives, museums, institutions for monument protection.
The researchers and writers	Elementary biographical and bibliographical data for 947 writers and scholars occupied with the Serbian past.
