= Rujište =

Mountain and ski resort in Bosnia and Herzegovina

- Veliko Rujište
- Location within Bosnia and Herzegovina

Highest point
- Elevation: 1,656 metres (5,433 ft)
- Coordinates: 43°26′07″N 17°58′22″E

Geography
- Location: Herzegovina-Neretva Canton, Bosnia and Herzegovina
- Parent range: Prenj

Rujište is a mountain (Veliko Rujište, 1,656 metres (5,433 ft) and Malo Rujište, 1,381 metres (4,531 ft)) and ski resort situated between the elevations of 1,052 metres (3,451 ft) and 1,175 metres (3,855 ft) in the municipality of Mostar, Bosnia and Herzegovina. It is located in mountain range Prenj.

== See also ==
- List of mountains in Bosnia and Herzegovina
