= Dubravka Stojanović =

Serbian historian

PhD Dubravka Stojanović
- Дубравка Стојановић
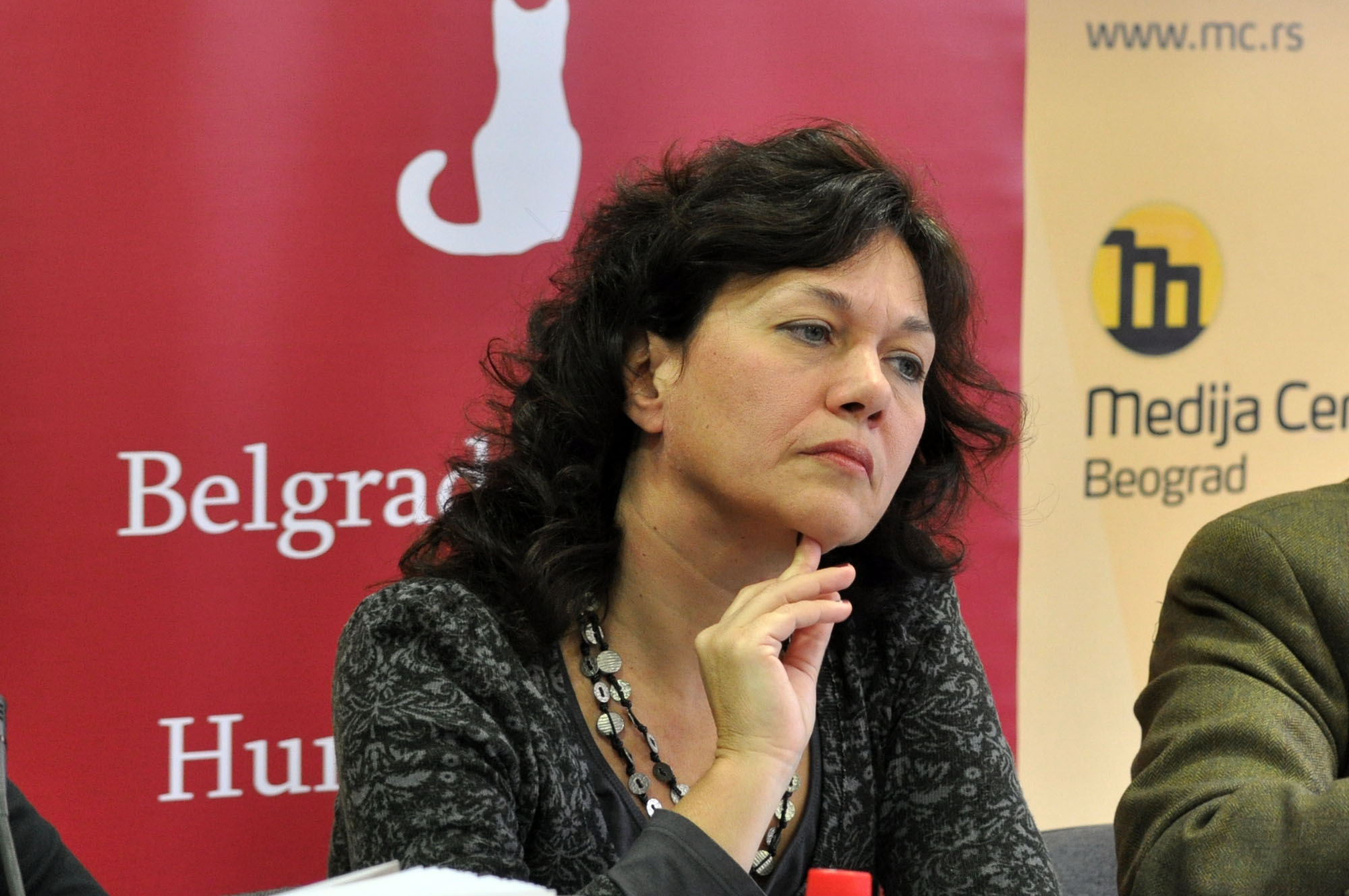
- Dubravka Stojanović at the Media Center Belgrade in 2010
- Born: February 15, 1963 (age 63); Belgrade, SR Serbia, Yugoslavia

Academic background
- Education: University of Belgrade Faculty of Philosophy
- Thesis: Evropski demokratski uzori kod srpske političke i intelektualne elite 1903-1914 [English: European democratic models among the Serbian political and intellectual elite 1903-1914] (2001)

Academic work
- Discipline: historian
- Institutions: Institute for Recent History of Serbia; University of Belgrade Faculty of Philosophy
- Main interests: 20th-century history of Serbia

Dubravka Stojanović (born February 15, 1963) is a former Yugoslav and Serbian historian, and professor at University of Belgrade Faculty of Philosophy. She is a vice-president of the Thessaloniki based History Education Committee organized by the Center for Democracy and Reconciliation in South Eastern Europe as well as a consultant of the United Nations on the issues of misuses of history in education. Her primary fields of interest are processes of modernization in Southeast Europe, democratization in Serbia, history of Belgrade, historical memory and presentations of history in history textbooks. In 2015, Dubravka Stojanović received French Ordre national du Mérite.

== Early life and education ==
Dubravka Stojanović was born in Belgrade in 1963 where she completed high school. She spent her childhood in Šibenik, Dalmatia, Croatia where her Croat maternal family Barbača lived. She enrolled into University of Belgrade Faculty of Philosophy History program in 1981 where she graduated in 1987, earned her master's degree in 1992 and PhD in 2002. Her educational and professional maturation and development happened in the context of deep socioeconomic crisis and epochal political changes of the breakup of Yugoslavia and Yugoslav Wars. Because her work focused on the 20th-century history of Serbia she was faced with the issue of historian's neutrality and distance from the topic of her work. In this dilemma she was influenced by the Annales school and Lucien Febvre's work in particular.

== Work ==
Between 1988 and 1996, Stojanović worked at the Institute for Recent History of Serbia after which she moved to the University of Belgrade Faculty of Philosophy in 1996 where she became docent in 2001 and full time professor in 2016.

She worked on issues of democracy in Serbia and in the Balkans in the late 19th and early 20th centuries, interpretations of history in new Serbian textbooks, social history, the process of modernization, and the history of women in Serbia. She also consults the United Nations on the misuses of history in education. In 2017, she has signed the Declaration on the Common Language of the Croats, Serbs, Bosniaks and Montenegrins.

Slobodan Antonić criticised her scientific conclusions about the role of the Serbian quisling forces in The Holocaust in German-occupied Serbia and considered her work on the subject to be meet the criteria of historical revisionism. Antonić criticized Stojanović's claim about prominent role local Serbian collaborationists played in Holocaust in Serbia accusing her of "revisionist" transfer of responsibility from Nazi German occupiers to the local Serbian forces. The criticism of Stojanović's and Nikola Samardžić work resulted in initiation of the "petition against persecution and calls for the lynching of critical historians" by the "pro-regime media, government officials and a group of ultra-right-wing intellectuals" which was signed by over 520 historians, representatives of all academic professions, artists and cultural workers from Serbia, other countries in the region, Europe and the world.

== Awards ==
Stojanović won the Belgrade City Award for Social Sciences in 2004, the Peace Prize from the Belgrade Center for Peace and Democracy in 2011, and the French national order of merit in 2015. She received the "Conquering Freedom" award for women who fought for human rights, democracy and the rule of law in 2012.

== Bibliography ==
=== Books ===
- Искушавање начела. Српска социјалдемократска партија и ратни програм Србије 1912–1918, Belgrade, 1994
- Србија и демократија: 1903–1914, Belgrade, 2003
- Калдрма и асфалт: Урбанизација и европеизација Београда 1890–1914, Belgrade, 2008
- Уље на води: Огледи из историје садашњости Србије, Belgrade, 2010
- Нога у вратима: Прилози за политичку биографију Библиотеке XX век, Belgrade, 2011
- Иза завесе: Огледи из друштвене историје Србије 1890–1914, Belgrade, 2013
- Рађање глобалног света 1880–2015, Belgrade, 2015
- Populism the Serbian Way, Belgrade, 2017
