= Radovan Samardžić =

Serbian historian

Radovan Samardžić (Serbian Cyrillic: Радован Самарџић; Sarajevo, 22 October 1922 – Belgrade, 1 February 1994) was a Yugoslav and Serbian historian, member of the Serbian Academy of Sciences and Arts (SANU).

He successfully defended his doctoral dissertation on the history of Dubrovnik in 1956. As a pupil of French historian, Fernand Braudel, Samardžić, throughout of his career, focused on research of Ottoman history.

== Selected works ==
- "Српска православна црква у XVI и XVII веку". ИСН. 3 (2): 73–74.
- "Религија у политичким сукобима у Југославији". Војно дело. 4–5.
- "На рубу историје". БИГЗ. 1994.
- Mehmed Sokolovitch: le destin d'un grand vizir. L'Age D'Homme. 1994. ISBN 978-2-8251-0515-3.
- Samardžić, Radovan; Duškov, Milan, eds. (1993). Serbs in European Civilization. Belgrade: Nova, Serbian Academy of Sciences and Arts, Institute for Balkan Studies. ISBN 9788675830153.
- "Аристократска вертикала у српској историји". Срби у европској цивилизацији. Belgrade: Балканолошки институт. 1993.
- "Турци у српској историји". Историја српског народа. 3. 1993.
- "Seobe u srpskoj istoriji: vreme tuđinske vlasti, do 1739". Politika i društvo. 1992.
- Islamski činilac u jugoslovenskim sukobima. 1992.
- O istorijskoj sudbini Srba. 1991.
- "Ragusa come sistema di funzioni". Ragusa e Il Mediterraneo. 1990.
- Seobe srpskog naroda od XIV do XX veka: zbornik radova posvećen tristagodišnjici velike seobe Srba. Zavod za udžbenike i nastavna sredstva. 1990.
- Косовско опредељење. Belgrade: Српска књижевна задруга. 1990.
- Kosovo i Metohija u srpskoj istoriji. Belgrade: Srpska književna zadruga. 1989.
- Samardžić, Radovan (1989). "Migrations in Serbian History (The Era of Foreign Rule)". Migrations in Balkan History. Belgrade: Institute for Balkan Studies. pp. 83–89. ISBN 9788671790062.
- Ideje za srpsku istoriju. Jugoslavijapublik. 1989. ISBN 9788671210485.
- Sulejman i Rokselana. Jugoslavijapublik. 1987. ISBN 9788671210171.
- "Pisci srpske istorije". 3. Prosveta. 1986.
- Archiprêtre Matija Nenadović et son époque. Srpska akademija nauka i umetnosti. 1985.
- "Gradska kultura na Balkanu (XV–XIX vek): O gradskoj civilizaciji na Balkanu XV–XIX veka". Zbornik radova, Posebna izdanja Balkanološkog instituta SANU. 20. 1984.
- Religija i položaj vjerskih zajednica u SFRJ: socijalističko samoupravljanje u Jugoslaviji. Vojnoizdavački zavod. 1984.
- Kulturno-političke veze Bugara s Kneževinom Srbijom od početka XIX veka do Pariskog mira 1856. godine [Relations culturelles et politiques des Bulgares avec la Principauté de Serbie depuis le commencement du XIXe siècle jusqu'au Traité de Paris 1856]. Balkanološki institut SANU. 1982.
- Andrić i istorija. Belgrade: Zadužbina Ive Andrića. 1981.
- Religious Communities in Yugoslavia. Jugoslovenska stvarnost. 1981.
- Usmena narodna hronika: ogledi i prilozi. Novi Sad: Matica srpska. 1978.
- "Друга похара Милешеве". X: 153–159. 1976.
- Religija-iskrivljena svijest i njeno prevazilaženje u savremenom društvu. Narodna armija. 1976.
- Писци српске историје. Belgrade: Просвета. 1976.
- "L'organisation intérieure des colonies ragusaines en Turquie aux XVIe et XVIIe siècles". Structure sociale et développement culturel des villes sud-est européennes et adriatiques aux XVIIe-XVIIIe siècles: 195–205. 1975.
- "Stages of Development of Balkan Culture and Education under the Ottomans in the Balkans in the Eighteenth Century". East European Quarterly. 9 (4): 405–. 1975.
- Мехмед Соколовић. Српска књижевна задруга. 1975.
- Studije i grada o Jevrejima Dubrovnika. Savez jevrejskih opstina Jugoslavije. 1971.
- Сто година Филозофског факултета (1863-1963). 1963.
- Veliki vek Dubrovnika. Prosveta. 1962.
- Београд и Србија у списима француских савременика, XVI–XVII век. 1961.
- "Borba Dubrovnika za opstanak posle velikog zemljotresa 1667. g.". Arhivska građa (1667-1670). 1960.
- Pogled u našu prošlost: Dokumenti primorskih arhiva od 10-19 veka. Dubrovnik, Zadar, Kotor. 1957.
- Hajdučke borbe protiv Turaka u XVI i XVII veku. Prosveta. 1952.

== See also ==
- List of Serbian historians
