= Siniša Mišić =

Serbian historian

- Синиша Мишић
- Born: 25 June 1961; Rujište, SR Serbia
- Occupation: Historian
- Years active: 1985–
- Known for: contributions to Serb medieval history
- Title: Professor

Academic background
- Thesis: 'Humska zemlja u srednjem veku' (1990)

Academic work
- Institutions: Faculty of Philosophy, University of Belgrade
- Notable works: Humska zemlja u srednjem veku Srpsko selo u srednjem veku

Siniša Mišić (Serbian: Синиша Мишић; born 1961) is a Serbian historian specializing in medieval history.

Mišić was born on 25 June 1961 in Rujište, Boljevac municipality. He studied history at the Faculty of Philosophy in Belgrade and graduated in 1985. In 1995 he became a docent, in 2002 an associate professor, and in 2008 a regular professor in Serb medieval history, historical geography and Old Slavic language. His work Humska zemlja u srednjem veku ("Hum land in the Middle Ages") is acclaimed. In 2020, he authored Srpsko selo u srednjem veku ("Serb village in the Middle Ages").

== Work ==
- Mišić, Siniša (2019). Српско село у средњем веку. Evoluta; Библиотека Полихистор. ISBN 978-86-80912-35-6.
- Mišić, Siniša (2014). Историјска географија српских земаља: од 6. до половине 16. века. Магелан Прес. ISBN 978-86-88873-17-8.
- Mišić, Siniša (2010). "Петрушко и Липовачко крајиште од половине XIV века до 1459. године". Расин. ан. 8: 121–128.
- Mišić, Siniša (2007). "Жупе Поморавље и Дубравница у средњем веку". In Aleksić, Dragan (ed.). Делиград од устанка ка независности: 1806-1876. : зборник радова са међународног научног скупа одржаног 2. септембра 2006. године у Алексинцу. Београд: Институт за новију историју Србије. pp. 1–7.
- Mišić, Siniša (2003). "Територијално-управна организација Полимља (XII-XIV век)". Краљ Владислав и Србија XIII века (Зборник радова; књ. 20): 73–87. ISBN 86-7743-030-X.

== See also ==
- List of Serbian historians

== Sources ==
- "Prof. dr Siniša Mišić". Bibliografije i biografije. Acta Historica.
- Koprivica, Marija (2025). "Синиша Мишић (1961)". Споменица о 180 година српке историје у настави и науци. Филозофски факултет Универзитет у Београду: 110–124. ISBN 978-86-6427-366-4.
