= Institute for Recent History of Serbia =

Research institute based in Belgrade, Serbia

Institute for Recent History of Serbia Институт за новију историју Србије
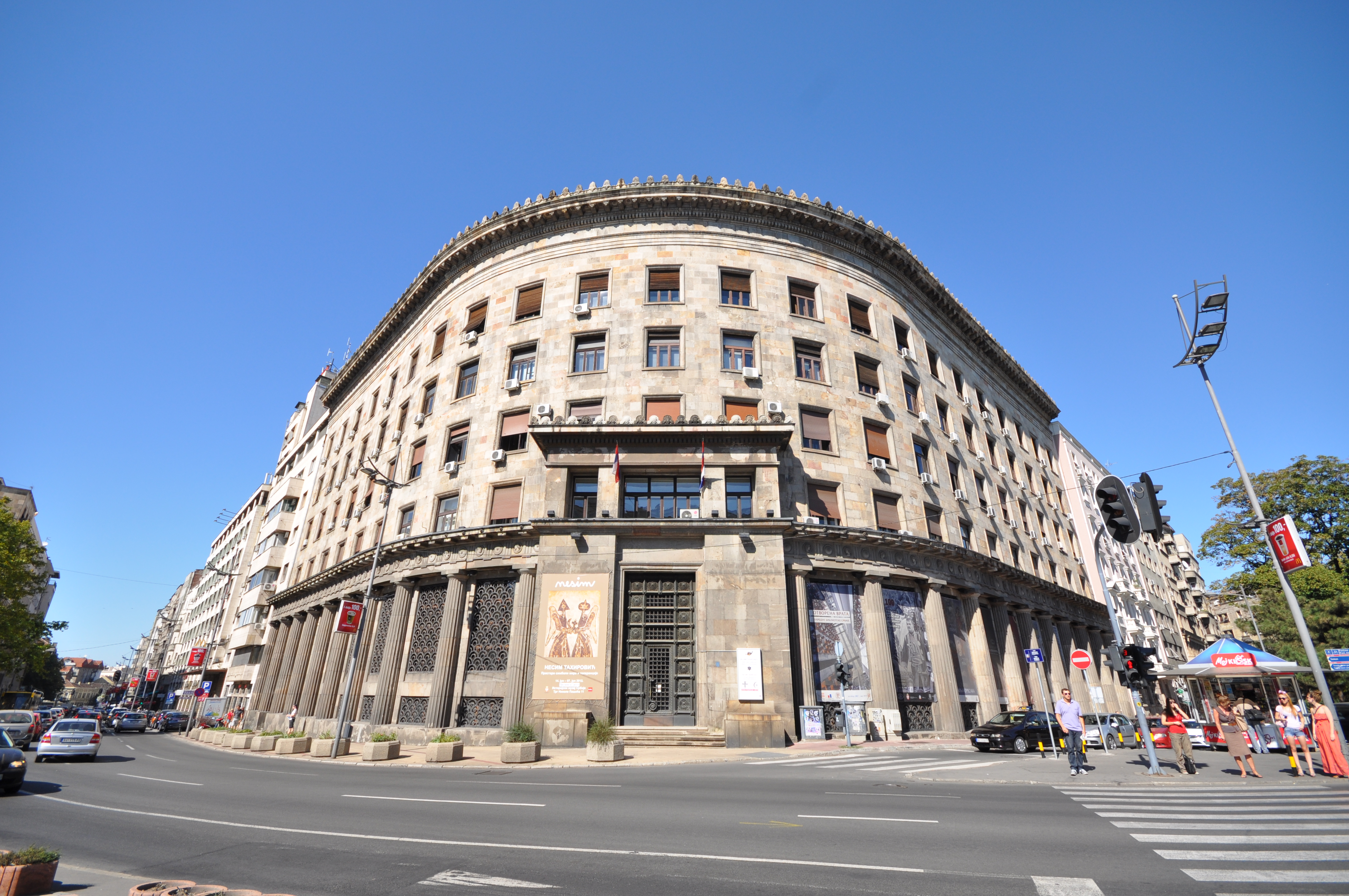
- Building of the institute (shared with the Historical Museum of Serbia)
- Founder: Communist Party of Serbia
- Established: 1949; 76 years ago
- Focus: humanities, history (history of the Serb people from 1918 to the present)
- Address: Nikola Pašić Square 11
- Location: Belgrade, Serbia
- Website: inis.bg.ac.rs/eng

The Institute for Recent History of Serbia (Serbo-Croatian: Институт за новију историју Србије, Institut za noviju istoriju Srbije) is a research institute based in Belgrade, Serbia. It is committed to the academic exploration and analysis of Serbian and Yugoslav history in the 20th and 21st century.

== History ==
Established in January 1949, initially as the Historical Department of the Central Committee of the Communist Party of Serbia, its focus was on studying party documents from 1929 to 1941. It evolved into the Commission for the History of the Central Committee of the Communist Party of Serbia in April 1952, concentrating on leftist and workers' ideologies and movements in Serbia up to the end of World War I. In July 1954 the institute transformed into the Historical Archive of the Central Committee of the Communist Party of Serbia.

During second Yugoslavia, analogous historical institutes were created elsewhere, such as the Institute for the History of the Workers' Movement in Croatia.

Recognizing the broader scope of historical research beyond the Communist Party's history, the Institute for the Collection and Processing of Documents on the Development of the Workers' Movement in Serbia was established on January 1, 1959. Renamed the Institute for the History of the Workers' Movement – Belgrade in 1965, it attained recognition as a scientific institute in April 1979.

Following her removal from active politics alongside the Serbian liberals in 1972, Latinka Perović completed her PhD and spent a period of considerable public isolation while she was "assigned" to work at the institute.

The institute assumed its current name in October 1992. In 2010 the institute signed a cooperation agreement with the University of Sarajevo in Bosnia and Herzegovina.

== See also ==
- Institute of History Belgrade
