= List of wars involving Serbia in the Middle Ages =

Medieval flag of the Kingdom of Serbia

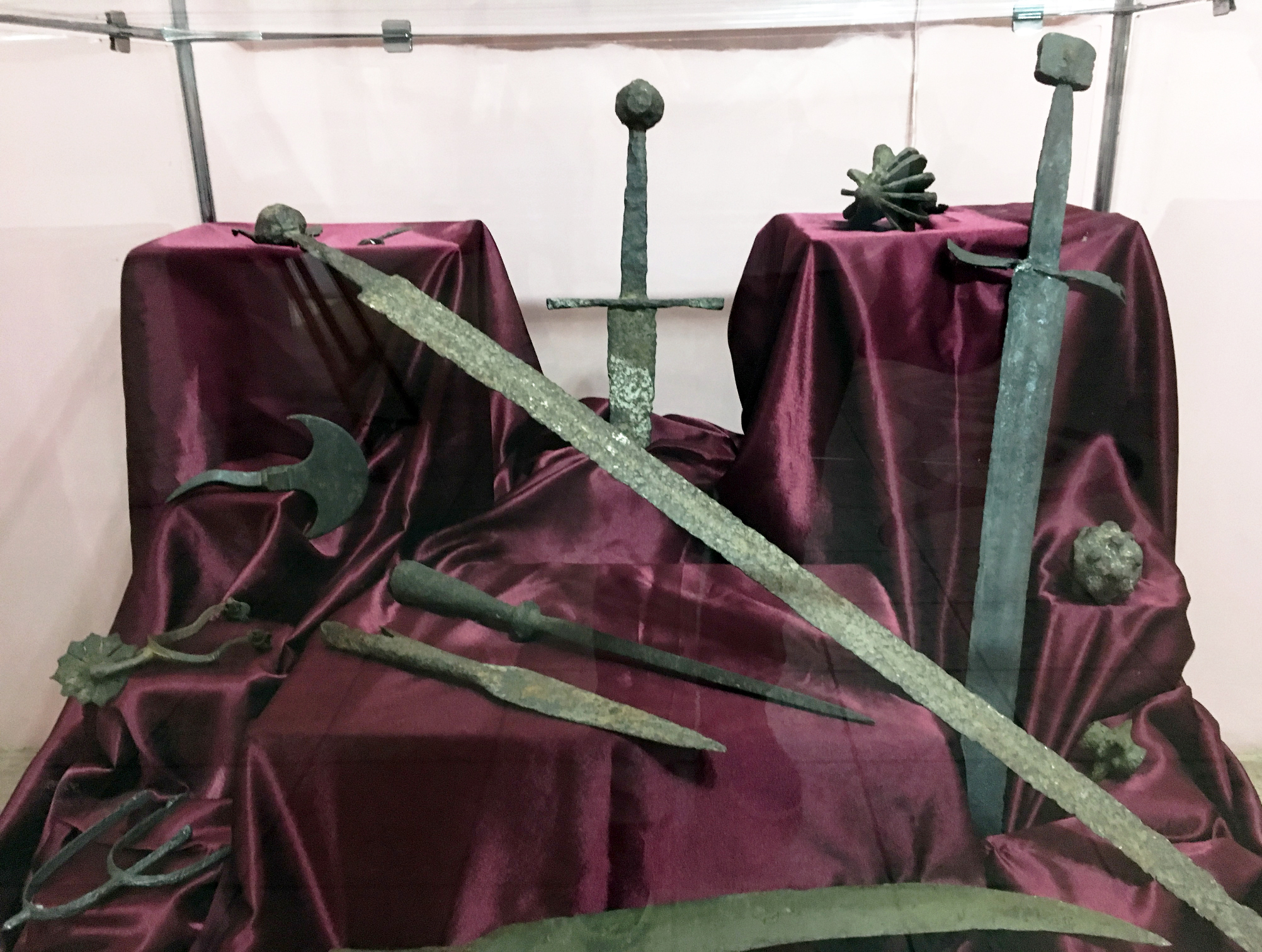
Weapons used by Serbian soldiers during the Middle Ages

This is a list of military conflicts in which Serbian states or armies participated during the Middle Ages.

Civil wars are not included unless there was a foreign intervention.

Not all wars including the Kingdom of Bosnia and the Principality of Zeta are included, the former because it was an independent kingdom that only later took the Nemanjić tradition, and the latter because after Crnojevći came to power in the middle of the 15th century it has its independent political development from the Serbian Despotate.

The list gives the name, the date, the Serbian allies and enemies, and the result of these conflicts following this legend:

Victory
Defeat
Inconclusive (e.g. result unknown or indecisive/inconclusive, status quo ante bellum, or a treaty or peace without a clear result)

== Early Middle Ages ==
Conflict	Combatant 1	Combatant 2	Results
Bulgarian-Serbian War (839–42)	Principality of Serbia	Bulgarian Empire	Victory: Khan Presian launched an invasion into Serbian territory in 839, which led to a war that lasted for three years, in which the Serbs, led by Price Vlastimir were victorious
Bulgarian-Serbian War (853)	Principality of Serbia	Bulgarian Empire	Victory: Boris I sought to avenge the defeat of his father, and in 853 or 854, sends the Bulgar army led by his son, Vladimir-Rasate, to invade the Principality of Serbia; The Serbian army, which was led by Mutimir and his two brothers, defeated the invaders, capturing Vladimir and 12 boyars, after which Boris I and Mutimir agreed on peace
Siege of Bari (870–871) A scene depicting Sawdan, third and last emir of Bari. interrogating a Byzantine ambassador	Frankish Empire; Byzantine Empire: Principality of Serbia	Emirate of Bari	Victory: According to On Administering the Empire, "present by [Byzantine] imperial mandate" at the siege were "the Croat and Serb and Zachlumian chiefs and the Terbouniotes and Kanalites and the men of Ragusa and all the cities of Dalmatia", who "were carried over into Lombardy [i.e., Langobardia Minor] by the inhabitants of the city of Ragusa in their own vessels
Rebellion against the Prince Petar Gojniković (895-896) Serb lands in the late 9th century	Principality of Serbia	Bran Mutimirović; Duchy of Croatia	Victory: From the Duchy of Croatia, Bran Mutimirović attacks the realm of Petar Gojniković, but suffers defeat and gets captured and blinded
Invasion of the Principality of Serbia by the pretender to the Serbian throne Klonimir backed by the Bulgarian Empire (897-898) The Seal of Strojimir (Klonimir's father)	Principality of Serbia	Klonimir; Bulgarian Empire	Victory: Rebellion sponsored by Simeon I of Bulgaria was defeated, resulting in the death of Klonimir and a truce between the Principality of Serbia and the Bulgarian Empire
Bulgar invasion and usurpation of the Serbian throne (917)	Principality of Serbia	Bulgarian Empire; Pavle Branovic	Defeat: Simeon I decided to deal with Prince Petar Gojniković before advancing further against the Byzantines. An army was dispatched under the command of Theodore Sigritsa and Marmais. The two persuaded Petar Gojniković to meet them, seized him, and sent him to Preslav, where he died in prison; Pavle Branovic becomes the new Prince of Serbia; Part of Bulgarian–Serbian wars of 917–924
Byzantine attempt of usurpation of the Serbian throne with contender Zaharija Pribislavljević (920)	Principality of Serbia	Byzantine Empire; Zaharija Pribislavljević	Victory: Zaharija, the exiled son of Pribislav (the eldest of Mutimir's sons), was sent by Romanos I Lekapenos (r. 920–944) to seize the throne. Prince Pavle of Serbia defeated and captured him, handing him over to Symeon, who held him for future use; Part of Bulgarian–Serbian wars of 917–924
Invasion of the Principality of Serbia by Zaharija Pribislavljević (921) Bulgarian campaigns on the territory of the Principality of Serbia	Principality of Serbia	Bulgarian Empire; Zaharija Pribislavljević	Defeat: In 921 Simeon I sent a Bulgarian army headed by Zaharija against the Serbian Principality. The Bulgarian intervention was successful, Pavle was deposed and once again a Bulgarian candidate was placed on the Serbian throne; Zaharija becomes the new Prince of Serbia; Part of Bulgarian–Serbian wars of 917–924
Invasion of the Principality of Serbia by the Bulgarian Empire (923) Serbian weapons from the Early Middle Age	Principality of Serbia	Bulgarian Empire	Victory: Zaharija, soon after taking the throne, switched to the Byzantine side, which prompted the retaliatory invasion by Simeon I which resulted in the Bulgarian defeat; Part of Bulgarian–Serbian wars of 917–924
Invasion and annexation of the Principality of Serbia by the Bulgarian Empire (924) Map of the First Bulgarian Empire under Tsar Simeon I the Great	Principality of Serbia	Bulgarian Empire	Defeat: After the previous defeat, a large Bulgarian force was dispatched, accompanied by a new candidate for the Serbian throne, Časlav, The Bulgarians ravaged the countryside and forced Zaharija to flee to the Kingdom of Croatia; Annexation of Serbia into the Bulgarian Empire; End of Bulgarian–Serbian wars of 917–924
Liberation of the Principality of Serbia from the Bulgar rule (933-934)	Česlav of Serbia	Bulgarian Empire	Victory: Česlav takes possession of the Serbian Principality and submits to the overlordship of Byzantine emperor Romanos I Lekapenos
Magyar-Serb conflict (c. 960)	Principality of Serbia	Magyar tribes	Inconclusive: Mythical, probably unrelated to the 10th century and Časlav; Victory at Drina; Defeat at Syrmia
Bulgarian-Serbian War (998) Fresco of Saint Jovan Vladimir in the church of the Lozen Monastery, Bulgaria	Duklja	Bulgarian Empire	Defeat: In 998 Tsar Samuil invaded the Serbian principality of Duklja, which was ruled by Prince Jovan Vladimir; The Serbs were unable to resist the Bulgarian army, and Jovan Vladimir was captured by Tsar Samuil, however, he married Samuil's daughter and returned to Duklja to rule as a Bulgarian vassal
Serb Uprising (1038–42): Battle of Bar	Duklja	Byzantine Empire	Victory: Independence of Duklja from Byzantine rule, Stefan Vojislav defeats Byzantine expeditions against him, and extends his realm on Zachlumia and Travunia
Intervention of Mihailo I of Duklja in Uprising of Georgi Voyteh (1072-1073) Uprising of Peter III and Georgi Voyteh (1072)	Duklja Bulgarian rebels	Byzantine Empire	Defeat: Bulgarian rebels chose the son of the Serbian Prince of Duklja Mihailo, Constantine Bodin as their leader, as he was a descendant of the Bulgarian Emperor Samuil, in the autumn of 1072 Constantine Bodin arrived at Prizren where he was proclaimed Emperor of the Bulgarians under the name Peter III; The Serbian Prince sent 300 soldiers led by Vojvoda Petrilo; An army under Damianos Dalassenos was immediately sent from Constantinople to help the strategos of the Theme of Bulgaria, Nikephoros Karantenos. In the battle that followed the Byzantine army was completely defeated. Dalassenos and other Byzantine commanders were captured and Skopie was taken by the rebels; Despite initial successes, rebels were defeated in December of 1072, Constantin Bodin was captured by the Byzantines, which leads to the suppression of the uprising in 1073 by Doux Nikephoros Bryennios
Bodin's conquest of Bosna and Rascia (1081)	Duklja	Byzantine Empire	Victory: King Bodin campaigned in Bosnia and Serbia, then under Byzantine rule, and installed his relative Stephen as knez in Bosnia and his nephews Vukan and Marko as župans in Serbia
Invasion of Duklja by John Doukas (1089) Theme of Dyrrhachium in the middle of the 11th century	Duklja	Byzantine Empire: Theme of Dyrrhachium	Defeat: King Bodin was captured by the governor of the Theme of Dyrrhachium, John Doukas, but managed to escape in 1091
First attack of the Grand Prince Vukan against Byzantium (1090) Serbian Medieval weapons	Grand Principality of Serbia	Byzantine Empire	Victory: In about 1090, Grand Prince Vukan began raiding Byzantine territory, first in the vicinity of Kosovo; Byzantines were unable to take steps against Vukan, as they faced a serious threat from the invading Pechenegs; Part of Byzantine–Serbian War (1090–1095)
Invasion of the Grand Principality of Serbia by Byzantine Emperor Alexios I Komnenos (1092) Map of the Byzantine Empire's frontier in the 10-12th century with forts around which was fought the war	Grand Principality of Serbia	Byzantine Empire	Victory: Alexios I Komnenos sent out an army led by the governor of Durazzo but they suffered defeat; In 1093 Alexius mobilized a larger army under his leadership and marched on Raska. Vukan immediately sent envoys to the emperor seeking peace and offering homage which Alexius quickly accepted; Part of Byzantine–Serbian War (1090–1095)
Second attack of the Grand Prince Vukan against Byzantium (1094) Ruins of the Skopje fortress	Grand Principality of Serbia	Byzantine Empire	Victory: Vukan breaks the treaty and begins to expand along the Vardar, obtaining much booty and taking the cities of Vranje, Skopje, and Tetovo; Part of Byzantine–Serbian War (1090–1095)
Retaliatory attack of John Komnenos on the Grand Prince Vukan (1094): Battle of Zvečan; Zvečan Fortress, an important fortification that overlooks the area of the battle	Grand Principality of Serbia	Byzantine Empire	Victory: John Komnenos (governor of Dyrrhachium) was defeated by Vukan at Zvečan, which provoked another intervention by Alexios, who now marched towards Serbia with a sizeable army; Vukan once more sued for peace. Alexios, still pressured by the mounting issues and eager to plug one of many leaks, made simple terms that Vukan accepted; End of Byzantine–Serbian War (1090–1095)
Third attack of the Grand Prince Vukan against Byzantium (1106) Grand Prince Vukan (seen in the middle, with beard). Fresco from the Sopoćani Monastery, painted ca. 1265.	Grand Principality of Serbia	Byzantine Empire	Victory: Grand Prince Vukan attacked Byzantium one last time, defeating the army of John Komnenos (governor of Dyrrhachium) once again; After this victory, Grand Prince Vukan once again reaches a truce with Alexios I Komnenos; The last mention of Grand Prince Vukan in recorded history
Serbian uprising During Byzantine–Hungarian War (1127–29): Battle of Haram; Historical map of Europe in 1130 CE.	Kingdom of Hungary Grand Principality of Serbia	Byzantine Empire	Defeat: As allied Hungarian troops advanced on the Byzantine territory, Serbs had success in their rebellion, capturing the city of Ras; Hungarian defeat and subsequent peace spelled doom for the Serbian uprising, John II Komnenos suppressed the revolt
Serbian Uprising of 1149: Battle of Tara (1150); Manuscript miniature of Manuel I, a powerful Byzantine Emperor who prevented the independence of the Principality of Serbia numerous times	Grand Principality of Serbia Kingdom of Hungary	Byzantine Empire	Defeat: Serbs rebelled while Emperor Manuel I Komnenos was in Avlona planning an offensive across the Adriatic against Normans; The rebellion was crushed, Manuel I Komnenos restored Uroš II in 1155 or 1156 and gave Desa the appanage of Dendra near Niš; Part of a Byzantine–Hungarian War (1149–1155)
Byzantine–Hungarian War (1164–1167): Battle of Sirmium	Byzantine Empire: Grand Principality of Serbia	Kingdom of Hungary	Victory: Serbian troops were called upon invasions of Manuel I Komnenos on the Kingdom of Hungary; Serbian troops participated in the Battle of Sirmium
Uprising of Stefan Nemanja against Byzantine vassals (1166) Serbia during the rule of Prince Stefan Nemanja and his son Stefan II, ca 1150-1220	Stefan Nemanja	Tihomir of Serbia Byzantine Empire	Victory: Stefan Nemanja took advantage of the Hungarian wars to expand his territories and even seized the maritime city of Kotor; Stefan Nemanja becomes the new Grand Prince of Serbia
Tihomir's invasion of the Grand Principality of Serbia (1167): Battle of Pantina	Grand Principality of Serbia	Tihomir of Serbia Byzantine Empire	Victory: While exiled in Byzantium, Tihomir of Serbia asked for military aid, which he got in the form of a mercenary army, however, he was defeated and killed in the battle of Pantina
Invasion of the Grand Principality of Serbia by Manuel I Komnenos (1172) Byzantine Empire at around 1170 AD	Grand Principality of Serbia	Byzantine Empire	Defeat: After a short resistance, Stefan Nemanja surrenders to the vastly superior Byzantine army
Byzantine campaign in the Middle East (1176) This image by Gustave Doré depicts the Turkish ambush at the pass of Myriokephalon	Byzantine Empire: Grand Principality of Serbia	Sultanate of Rum	Defeat: The Byzantine army, which included Serbian troops sent because of vassal obligations, was defeated by Seljuks
Intervention of the Grand Principality of Serbia in Byzantine–Hungarian War (1183-1185)	Kingdom of Hungary Grand Principality of Serbia	Byzantine Empire	Victory: Stefan Nemanja joins the Hungarian offensive against Byzantium, scoring a victory and continuing to wage war independently after Béla III finished the campaign
War of Serbian Independence against the Byzantine Empire (1183-1191) Campaigns and controlled territory (permanent and temporary) of Stefan Nemanja in his war against the Byzantine Empire	Grand Principality of Serbia	Byzantine Empire	Victory: Independence of the Grand Principality of Serbia; Borders of Serbia expended significantly in the direction of Metohija, Niš, Skopje, and Adriatic; Byzantine counteroffensive in 1191 and victory at the Battle of Morava reversed some of Serbian gains, but it was not able to subdue the Grand Principality of Serbia and recover the majority of lost territory; Peace deal between Serbia and Byzantium
Attack of the Hungarian King Bela III on the Grand Principality of Serbia (1192-1193)	Grand Principality of Serbia Byzantine Empire	Kingdom of Hungary	Victory: Hungarian invasion of the Grand Principality of Serbia prompted the intervention of Isaac II Angelos against the invaders; Retreat of the Hungarian army; Stefan Nemanja preserves his throne and state
Attack of Andrew II of Hungary on Hum (1198) Seal of Grand Prince Stefan Nemanja from 1198	Grand Principality of Serbia	Kingdom of Hungary	Inconclusive: Duke Andrew II of Hungary invades Hum, then part of the Grand Principality of Serbia, occupies a part of it temporarily, but then loses it; Hum remains a part of the Grand Principality of Serbia
Civil war between Stefan the First-Crowned and Vukan Nemanjić (1202-1204) Depiction of Vukan Nemanjić from the 14th century, pretender to the Serbian throne	Stefan the First-Crowned Bulgarian Empire	Vukan Nemanjić Kingdom of Hungary	Inconclusive: Status quo ante bellum; Vukan, supported by the Kingdom of Hungary, defeats Stefan the First-Crowned and becomes Grand Prince of Serbia, but as Hungarian vassal; Stefan the First-Crowned exiled to the Bulgarian Empire; Vukan takes part in successful Hungarian invasion of the Bulgarian Empire in 1202; Bulgarian emperor Kaloyan defeats Hungarians and successfully invades the Grand Principality of Serbia in 1203; Stefan the First-Crowned returns and becomes the Grand Prince of Serbia once again, while Vukan returns to Zeta
Invasion of the Bulgarian Empire by the Grand Principality of Serbia (1207-1208) Plan of the medieval fortress Prosek, seat of the Bulgarian feudal lords Dobromir Chrysos and Strez	Stefan the First-Crowned: Strez	Bulgarian Empire	Victory: Grand Principality of Serbia successfully invades the western part of the Bulgarian Empire and expands its territory; Strez established himself in Prosek, a stronghold from which he began expanding into neighboring Macedonia
Invasion of Zeta by the Despotate of Epirus (1214) Map of the territorial expansion of the principality of Epirus under its first two rulers, Michael I Komnenos Doukas (1205-15) and Theodore Komnenos Doukas (1215-30)	Grand Principality of Serbia	Despotate of Epirus	Victory: After successfully invading territories of the Republic of Venice and Arbanon, Michael I Komnenos Doukas invades Zeta; Although he captures Skadar, his invasion fails and gains get reversed
Joint Bulgarian-Latin invasion of The Grand Principality of Serbia (1214) Fresco-painting in the Hilandar monastery depicting the death of Strez	Grand Principality of Serbia	Bulgarian Empire: Strez; Latin Empire	Victory: In 1214 the Bulgarian-Latin alliance planned a two-pronged attack on the Grand Principality of Serbia. Troops of Henry of Flanders and Boril of Bulgaria were to advance upon Serbia from the east while Strez invaded from the south; Serbians try unsuccessful diplomatic action to stop Strez's advance, but he dies shortly after it, leading to the collapse of his forces; The joint invasion of Serbia fails after the death of Strez

== Kingdom of Serbia (1217–1346) ==
Conflict	Combatant 1	Combatant 2	Results
Invasion of the Kingdom of Serbia by Hungarian Crusaders (1237) Fresco depicting King Stefan Vladislav	Kingdom of Serbia	Kingdom of Hungary	Victory: In 1237, Coloman of Galicia-Lodomeria attacked Hum; The northern part, held by a relative of King Vladislav, Toljen II, fell quickly, but Vladislav dispatched an army to regain the region. The crusaders were pushed to the border, and Vladislav pursued them as far as the Cetina River; Part of the Bosnian Crusade
Mongol invasion of the Balkans (1241–1242): Invasion of Hungary; Invasion of Serbia; Invasion of Bulgaria; Mongol invasion in Europe (1235-1242)	Kingdom of Serbia Bulgarian Empire Kingdom of Hungary	Golden Horde (Mongols)	Defeat: Defeat of the military alliance led by the Kingdom of Hungary; Bulgaria enters into vassal relations with the Mongols; Mongols pass through Serbia burning and looting
War between the Kingdom of Serbia and Dubrovnik (1254) Walls of Dubrovnik	Kingdom of Serbia	Dubrovnik Radoslav, Lord of Hum Bulgarian Empire	Inconclusive: Dubrovnik forms an alliance with Tsar Micheal Asen of Bulgaria and Radoslav Andrijić against the Kingdom of Serbia; Bulgarian army penetrates Serbia as far as Bijelo Polje, but then suddenly retreats; No real results from the war
Joint invasion of Empire of Nicaea by Epirote and Serbian forces (1257) Michael II "Komnenos Dukas" Angelos, despot of Epirus	Despotate of Epirus Kingdom of Serbia	Empire of Nicaea	Victory: Serbian and Epirote armies went into action simultaneously, Michael II Komnenos Doukas rapidly regained most of Albania, most probably including Durazzo, then they went into Macedonia and quickly reoccupied Kastoria and Prilep
Involvement of Serbian contingent in Nicaean expedition against Epirus (1259)	Empire of Nicaea: Serbian contingent	Despotate of Epirus Principality of Achaea: Duchy of Athens; Duchy of the Archipelago; Triarchs of Negroponte; Kingdom of Sicily	Victory: Nicaean forces, which included Serbian cavalry units, scored a decisive victory; It is more probable that rather than a royal army, it may instead have been "some disaffected Serbian nobleman [...] with his own followers" who joined the Nicaeans on his own account, due to the alliance of Uroš I with anti-Nicaean forces
War between the Kingdom of Serbia and Dubrovnik (1265-1268) Satellite image showing Dubrovnik and its surroundings	Kingdom of Serbia	Dubrovnik	Inconclusive: The peace treaty established the Serbian tribute, which Dubrovnik had to pay annually to preserve free trade rights in Serbia
Mačva War Territory of the Duchy of Macsó (yellow) in the mid-13th century	Kingdom of Hungary	Kingdom of Serbia	Defeat: Serbian invasion devastates Mačva; Béla IV 's army captures Stefan Uroš I. Their conflict was solved with dynastic marriage
Rebellion of Stefan Dragutin against the King of Serbia, Stefan Uroš I (1276): Battle of Gacko; Fresco of King Dragutin	King of Serbia, Stefan Uroš I	Stefan Dragutin Kingdom of Hungary	Defeat: Stefan Dragutin, with the help of the Kingdom of Hungary, defeats his father, Stefan Uroš I, in the battle of Gacko and becomes the new King of Serbia
Invasion of Macedonia by Stefan Milutin and Stefan Dragutin (1282) Charles I of Anjou, King of Sicily	Kingdom of Serbia	Byzantine Empire	Victory: King of Serbia, Stefan Milutin, joins the campaign of Charles I of Anjou against Byzantium; The Kingdom of Serbia expends its territory and captures the city of Skopje
Nogai intervention in Serbian-Byzantine conflict (1292-1293) Serbian King Milutin after a victory over the Tatars (19th-century lithograph)	Kingdom of Serbia	Byzantine Empire Golden Horde: Nogai Khan	Victory: Byzantine-Nogai army penetrates Serbia as far as Prizren and Lipljan; In the battle at river Drim, the Nogai detachment is decisively defeated; The joint invasion did not affect Serbian military operations as they continued immediately after it
Renewed invasion of Byzantium by the King Stefan Milutin and Stefan Dragutin (1283) Fresco of Stefan Uroš II Milutin of Serbia in Gračanica	Kingdom of Serbia	Byzantine Empire	Victory: Armies of King Stefan Milutin and his brother Stefan Dragutin reach as far as the Aegean Sea
Invasion of Western Macedonia and Albania by Stefan Milutin (1284)	Kingdom of Serbia	Byzantine Empire	Victory: Stefan Dragutin doesn't participate in the invasion following the one from 1293, probably to participate in the Hungarian attack on Braničevo; Stefan Milutin attacks Byzantium once again, occupying Debar, Poreč, and Kičevo in western Macedonia, and northern Albania
Invasion of Braničevo by joint forces of Hungary and Stefan Dragutin (1285) Kingdom of Syrmia from 1282 to 1316, ruled by Stefan Dragutin	Kingdom of Hungary: Stefan Dragutin	Bulgarian Empire: Darman and Kudelin	Defeat: The combined efforts of Hungary and Dragutin in 1285 were unsuccessful in ousting Darman and Kudelin, who quickly struck back by devastating Dragutin’s territories; Darman and Kudelin used Cuman and Tatar units, while Stefan Dragutin looked for help from Stefan Milutin to defeat them; Darman and Kudelin occupy a large portion of Dragutin's land
Invasion of Braničevo by Stefan Milutin and Stefan Dragutin (1291) Replica of helmet worn by Cumans, warriors that were used by Darman and Kudelin	Kingdom of Serbia: Stefan Dragutin	Bulgarian Empire: Darman and Kudelin	Victory: Joint forces of Stefan Milutin and Stefan Dragutin defeat Darman and Kudelin and occupy Braničevo
War between the Kingdom of Serbia and the Prince of Vidin, Shishman (1292) Medieval fortress of Vidin	Kingdom of Serbia	Bulgarian Empire: Shishman of Vidin	Victory: Shishman of Vidin, an ally of Darman and Kudelin, invades Serbia with his army, which consisted mainly of Tatar soldiers; Sishman's army penetrates deep into Serbian territory but suffers a decisive defeat at Ždrelo (near Peć); The Kingdom of Serbia conducts a successful counteroffensive and captures Vidin
Invasion of the Kingdom of Serbia by general Michael Doukas Glabas (1298) Device of the Byzantine emperor Andronikos II Palaiologos, in the so-called "Flag of Andronikos Palaiologos" kept in the Vatopedi Monastery	Kingdom of Serbia	Byzantine Empire	Victory: Emperor Andronikos II Palaiologos sends an army to retake Macedonia under megas konostaulos Michael Doukas Glabas; Even with his extensive military background and the command of a relatively powerful army, Glabas struggled to gain any ground since the Serbs employed guerrilla tactics and avoided direct confrontations, resulting in the failure of the campaign
Attack on Kotor by the Republic of Ragusa (1301) Venice, Navy Museum (Museo Storico Navale di Venezia), galley with rowing slaves, wooden model	Kingdom of Serbia: Kotor	Republic of Ragusa Republic of Venice Ban of Croatia Zadar	Victory: Armada of Catholic allies attacks Kotor but suffers defeat; Part of a greater conflict between the Kingdom of Serbia and the Republic of Ragusa which ended in a peace treaty favorable to Serbia
Invasion of Hum and Zeta by Paul I Šubić of Bribir (1301-1303) Depiction of Paul I Šubić of Bribir on the 14th century Chest of Saint Simeon in Zadar	Kingdom of Serbia	Paul I Šubić of Bribir	Defeat: Paul I Šubić of Bribir successfully conquered Hum, and put in its administrative governorship members of the Nelipčić family (Konstantin until 1307, and Izan 1307-1313). Although his son Mladen II (count of Hum since 1304) was possibly captured, it didn't affect Šubić's territorial control.
Invasion of Hum and Zeta by Paul I Šubić of Bribir (1301-1303) Depiction of Paul I Šubić of Bribir on the 14th century Chest of Saint Simeon in Zadar	Kingdom of Serbia	Paul I Šubić of Bribir	Victory: Paul I Šubić of Bribir, alongside supporting the naval attack on Kotor, penetrates deep into Zeta, reaching Onogošt; Today, this invasion is associated with the fighting over Kotor and its surroundings, after which the invaders retreaded from Zeta and the area of Trebinje
Attacks of the Grand Catalan Company on Mount Athos (1307-1310) Hilandar, Serbian Orthodox monastery, Mount Athos, Greece	Hilandar: Kingdom of Serbia	Grand Catalan Company	Victory: Repeated raids by the marauding Catalan Company are repulsed by monks of Hilandar monastery with support from King Stefan Milutin
War between Stefan Dragutin and Charles Robert (1307-1314) Charles I of Hungary	Realm of Stefan Dragutin	Kingdom of Hungary: Charles Robert	Inconclusive: Frequent raids of the territory of Ugrin Csák, an ally of Charles Robert, by Stefan Dragutin; Ugrin Csák defeats the army of Stefan Dragutin, but the raids into his territory continue; Stefan Dragutin makes peace with Charles Robert in Sremska Mitrovica in February of 1314
Serbian intervention in the war between Byzantines and Turcopoles (1312): Battle of Gallipoli	Byzantine Empire: Kingdom of Serbia	Turcopoles	Victory: Stefan Milutin sent a detachment of 2000 cavalrymen to aid Byzantium; Turcopoles are annihilated in the following battle
Serbian military expedition in Asia Minor in aid of the Byzantine Empire (1313)	Kingdom of Serbia: Byzantine Empire	Beylik of Aydin	Victory: Originally meant to be a campaign led directly by King Stefan Milutin, however, he got preoccupied with the war against Mladen II Šubić in the west; Veliki vojvoda Novak Grebostrek takes command of the campaign and leads it against Aydinids, scoring victories; Despite not changing the dire situation of the Byzantine Empire, this expedition is celebrated by both Greek and Serbian sources
War between Mladen II Šubić and brothers Stefan Milutin and Stefan Dragutin (1312-1313) Illumination from a manuscript depicting Mladen II Šubić of Bribir	Kingdom of Serbia Realm of Stefan Dragutin	Mladen II Šubić	Inconclusive: In 1312 or 1313, brothers Stefan Milutin and Stefan Dragutin planned a re-conquest offensive against the Šubić family in Hum, but it is not clear what are the results of this war and "possibly never happened".
War between Mladen II Šubić and the Kingdom of Serbia (1318-1319)	Kingdom of Serbia	Mladen II Šubić	Victory: As part of Hungarian-Italian initiative against the Serbian king, Mladen II Šubić attacks eastern Hum, Trebinje and Konavle with significant success.; However, a year later the tide changes, and Mladen's brother, Grgur Šubić, gets captured along with two other nobles, prompting peace negotiations, and the Šubić's agree to restore eastern Hum to Milutin.
Revolt of the Albanian nobility against the Kingdom of Serbia (1319)	Kingdom of Serbia	Albanian nobility: Muzaka family lead the revolt; Pope John XXII and Philip I of Taranto support the revolt	Victory: Revolt crashed by Stefan Milutin
War between the Kingdom of Serbia and the Kingdom of Hungary (1319)	Kingdom of Serbia	Kingdom of Hungary	Defeat: After the death of Stefan Dragutin, the Kingdom of Serbia occupied most of his realm, which the Kingdom of Hungary considered to be theirs; Provoked by this action, Charles Robert, with the support of Pope John XXII, tries to assemble a Catholic coalition against Stefan Milutin, but this diplomatic action fails; Warfare between the two kingdoms results in Hungarian victory in Mačva, but, Serbia managed to keep Braničevo and prevent further advances into its territory
Conquest of Hum by the Branivojević family (1321-1322) Medieval fortifications at Ston	Branivojević noble family	Mladen II Šubić	Victory: Branivojevići, a local noble family or agents of King Milutin, take control of Hum, expending their influence from the eastern to the western part of it; Although it is unclear if they also conquered Ston and Pelješac during or after the rule of Mladen II, they did participate in his downfall
War of Hum (1326–1329)	Kingdom of Serbia: Branivojević	Banate of Bosnia Republic of Ragusa	Defeat: Joint Bosnian-Ragusan action against the Branivojević noble family, who were a semi-independent Serbian noble family, and the unpreparedness of Stefan Dečanski to help his vassals, led to the loss of Hum; Bosnian renewed invasion of the Kingdom of Serbia in 1328/1329 was defeated by Stefan Dušan, which is the first recorded conflict of the future Emperor of Serbia; Despite some reversal of Bosnian gains Ban Stephen II Kotromanić keeps most of Hum
War between the Kingdom of Serbia and the Republic of Ragusa (1327-1328)	Kingdom of Serbia: Kotor	Republic of Ragusa	Victory: After occupying the territories of Branivojević, relations between Serbia and Ragusa were tense; A new war between the two states starts in the fall of 1327 and lasts till the fall of 1328, resulting in the Serbian reconquest of Ston
War between the Kingdom of Serbia and the Bulgarian-Byzantine coalition (1330): Battle of Velbazhd; Battle of Velbužd, detail from Visoki Dečani	Kingdom of Serbia: Western mercenaries	Bulgarian Empire: Cumans; Tatars; Jasz; Wallachia; Byzantine Empire	Victory: Emperor Andronikos III and Emperor Michael Asen III settled an anti-Serbian peace treaty on the 13th of May 1327; The joint invasion of the Kingdom of Serbia starts in July of 1330, with the Byzantine advance from the South and the Bulgarian advance from the East; Bulgarian forces are decisively defeated at the battle of Velbazhd; Bulgarian defeat leads to the collapse of the coalition against Serbia
First Byzantine-Serbian war of Dušan's reign (1331) The fresco of king Stefan Dušan praying to the Angel, Dečani, Serbia	Kingdom of Serbia	Byzantine Empire	Victory: First conquest of Byzantium conducted by Stefan Dušan; Although limited in scope compared to the later campaigns, Serbians occupied Strumica and expanded their territory South
Second Byzantine-Serbian war of Dušan's reign (1333-1334) Conquests of Serbia under Stefan Dušan	Kingdom of Serbia	Byzantine Empire	Victory: Dušan began campaigning against the Byzantine Empire in late 1333, when Syrgiannes, a leading Byzantine general, switched sides; After the significant success of the campaign, it comes to a halt after Syrgiannes is murdered by Byzantine conspirators; Peace deal between King Stefan Dušan and Emperor Andronikos III Palaiologos from 1334 confirms most of the Serbian conquest
Hungarian invasion of the Kingdom of Serbia (1334-1335)	Kingdom of Serbia	Kingdom of Hungary: Banate of Bosnia	Victory: While Stefan Dušan was campaigning in Macedonia, Charles I, supported by Stephan II, launched an invasion of the northern territory of the Kingdom of Serbia; With the news of Stefan Dušan's return, the Hungarian army rapidly retreats with possible high casualties while trying to cross the river Sava
Invasion of Central Albania by the Kingdom of Serbia (1336) Durazzo in the Middle ages	Kingdom of Serbia	Kingdom of Albania (medieval): Capetian House of Anjou	Inconclusive: Albanian defense collapsed and city of Durazzo fell; The Kingdom of Serbia had "limited success" in central Albania; Angevin prince, Louis of Durazzo, gained successes while fighting against Serbs
Third Byzantine-Serbian war of Dušan's reign (1342-1343) Byzantine Emperor John VI Kantakouzenos presiding over a synod. The Hesychast Council of Constantinople, 1351	Kingdom of Serbia: John VI Kantakouzenos	Byzantine Empire	Victory: Intervention of King Stefan Dušan on behalf of pretender John VI Kantakouzenos in his war against regent Anna of Savoy; Intervention in the civil war turns into conquest of south Macedonia, with Edessa, Kastoria, and Florina falling under the Kingdom of Serbia; Part of the Byzantine civil war of 1341–1347
Dušan's great invasion of Albania (1343-1346)	Kingdom of Serbia	Kingdom of Albania (medieval): Capetian House of Anjou	Victory: Stefan Dušan launches a great invasion of Albania; Swift and methodological conquest of major Albanian strongholds; Although the fate of Durazzo is unknown, the whole of Albania is occupied by the Kingdom of Serbia by 1346
Battle of Stephaniana	Kingdom of Serbia	Emirate of Aydin	Defeat: King Stefan Dušan sends his elite units under his general Preljub in order to fight against the Turks; Superior tactical awareness and mobility of Turks bring them victory; Possible short halt of offensive actions by King Stefan Dušan
Fourth Byzantine-Serbian war of Dušan's reign (1343-1345) Acropolis of Serres, an important Byzantine castle	Kingdom of Serbia	Byzantine Empire: John VI Kantakouzenos; Emirate of Aydin	Victory: Stefan Dušan turns hostile against John VI Kantakouzenos and concludes a formal alliance with the regency; The Kingdom of Serbia attacks Byzantine territory, capturing Serres after a long siege, while Kantakouzenos-Turkish forces fail to drive the invaders out, prioritizing attacking regent Anna of Savoy; After these conquests, Stefan Dušan becomes Emperor of the Serbs; Part of the Byzantine civil war of 1341–1347

== Serbian Empire (1346–1371) ==
Conflict	Combatant 1	Combatant 2	Results
Fifth Byzantine-Serbian war of Dušan's reign (1347-1348) Map of the Serbian Empire, University of Belgrade, 1922	Serbian Empire	Byzantine Empire	Victory: John VI Kantakouzenos becomes the new Byzantine emperor; Black Death devastates Greek territories, leaving them vulnerable; Emperor Stefan Dušan launches an invasion of the Byzantine Empire and conquers Epirus, Aetolia, Acarnania, and Thessaly
Bosnian–Serbian War (1350–1351) The heraldry belongs to Banate of Bosnia	Serbian Empire	Banate of Bosnia	Defeat: Serbian Empire attacks the region of Hum, which Banate of Bosnia occupied in 1326, and achieves significant success; However, Emperor Stefan Dušan turns his army south on the news that John VI Kantakouzenos has launched invasion of the newly-acquired Serbian land; Only small garrisons left to defend Hum, which Stjepan II Kotromanić had no problem defeating
Sixth Byzantine-Serbian war of Dušan's reign (1350-1351)	Serbian Empire	Byzantine Empire: Ottoman beylik	Victory: Byzantine Empire, with additional Turkish troops, invades the Serbian Empire, achieving significant success, but the siege of Servia fails; Serbian counteroffensive reverses the gains of the Byzantines
Seventh Byzantine-Serbian war of Dušan's reign (1352): Battle of Demotika; Restored mosaic of John V Palaiologos	Serbian Empire: John V Palaiologos; Bulgarian Empire	Byzantine Empire: Ottoman beylik	Defeat: Serbian intervention in the Byzantine civil war of 1352–1357 on the behalf of John V Palaiologos; The joint army of Serbians, Bulgarians, and Greeks was defeated by more numerous Ottomans in the Battle of Demotika; The battle was the first major battle of the Ottomans on European soil
Hungarian-Serbian War (1354-1355)	Serbian Empire	Kingdom of Hungary	Victory: War can be classified as a crusade against schismatics; The initial invasion of the northern parts of the Serbian Empire was successful, which prompted Emperor Stefan Dušan to start negotiations with Pope Innocent VI on recognizing papal supremacy, although it is questionable how sincere this attempt was; Despite initial successes, the Hungarian invasion was defeated while the Serbian counteroffensive might have captured additional territory from the Kingdom of Hungary
Invasion of Thessaly and Epirus by Nikephoros II Orsini (1356)	Serbian Empire	Nikephoros II Orsini	Defeat: Nikephoros II Orsini swiftly captures Thessaly and Epirus after the death of Stefan Dušan and Preljub; However, he does not return the territory to the Byzantine Empire, but reestablishes the Despotate of Epirus
Byzantine invasion of southeastern territories of the Serbian Empire (1356-1357)	Serbian Empire	Byzantine Empire	Defeat: Byzantine army, led by two powerful magnates, reoccupied territories on the southeastern border of the Serbian Empire
Invasion of Serres by Matthew Kantakouzenos (1357)	Serbian Empire	Byzantine Empire: Ottoman beylik	Victory: Matthew Kantakouzenos, with an army primarily consisting of Turkish mercenaries, attacked Serres; The commander of the Turkish troops was killed early in the battle of Serres, which spelled doom for the forces of Matthew Kantakouzenos, who gets captured after the battle
Rebellion of John Komnenos Asen against the central power of the Serbian Empire (1357) The map that represents the territories of the noble families in the Serbian Empire in 1360	Serbian Empire	John Komnenos Asen: Republic of Venice	Defeat: Powerful magnate John Komnenos Asen establishes himself as an independent ruler; His might will be greatly reduced over time, leading to the collapse of his realm
Invasion of Zeta by pretender Simeon Uroš (1358) Detail of fresco Loza Nemanjića, Simeon Siniša, Visoki Dečani, Serbia	Serbian Empire	Simeon Uroš: Greek and Albanian supporters	Victory: Simeon Uroš, half-brother of Stefan Dušan, proclaims himself as the new Serbian Emperor and gathers a sizable army consisting of Greek and Albanian troops; Simeon Uroš occupies a large part of the Despotate of Epirus; Stefan Uroš V, who is supported by most of the Serbian nobility, defeats the pretender's army near Skadar, and Stefan Uroš is never again a threat to his rule
Invasion of Thessaly and Epirus by the self-proclaimed Emperor Simeon Uroš (1359) Empire of the Greeks and Serbs and whole Albania (Empire of Simeon Uroš - Siniša), 14th century	Empire of Simeon Uroš	Despotate of Epirus	Victory: After the death of Nikephoros II Orsini in the Battle of Achelous Simeon Uroš reestablishes the Serbian control of Thessaly and Epirus, but as an independent ruler
Hungarian-Serbian War (1359) Louis I of Hungary	Serbian Empire	Kingdom of Hungary: Rastislalić noble family	Victory: The Kingdom of Hungary interferes in the fighting of northern Serbian nobles, installing Rastislalić as their vassals, who soon after became independent; This intervention soon became the full-scale invasion of the Serbian Empire, headed personally by Louis I of Hungary; Uroš V meets invaders on the battlefield, but suffers defeat; Serbs turn to guerilla warfare in the hills, which Hungarians had no answer for, so their army retreats
War between the Serbian Empire and the Republic of Ragusa (1359) Vojinović family coat of arms, from the Korenić-Neorić Armorial	Serbian Empire: Vojislav Vojinović	Republic of Ragusa	Victory: This conflict could be seen as a continuation of the Hungarian-Serbian War of 1359, as the Republic of Ragusa became a subject of the Kingdom of Hungary after the Treaty of Zadar; Vojislav Vojinović, with the approval of Emperor Uroš V, invades the territory of the Republic of Ragusa and devastates it; Republic of Ragusa pays tribute to Vojislav Vojinović
War between the Serbian Empire and the Republic of Ragusa (1361-1362) Small Coat of Arms of Balsic Dynasty	Serbian Empire: Vojislav Vojinović; Kotor	Republic of Ragusa: Balšići; Budva	Inconclusive: Beginning of the collapse of the central power in the Serbian part of the Serbian Empire as Balšić and the town of Budva openly sided with the Republic of Ragusa; War began with military attacks and devastation of inland territories of Ragusa, which responded by naval blockade of Kotor; Still, Ragusa was suffering losses, however, the tide changes when Balšiči and Budva entered the war on their side; Peace concluded between Ragusa and the Serbian Empire, which proved that the war ended inconclusively
Balšići-Thopia War (1363–66) Portrait of Karl Thopia at Skanderbeg Museum	Balšići: Matarangos	Thopia	Defeat: Đurađ I Balšić, together with his Matarangos allies, declare war against Thopia, noble family which controlled northern Albania; Đurađ I Balšić gets captured by Karl Thopia and gets held until 1366, when Republic of Ragusa mediated peace and procured his release
Albanian-Epirote War (1367–70) Princess Maria Paelolog and her husband Thomas Prelubovich. Detail of icon "Doubting Saint Thomas". Monastery of Transfiguration, Metheora	Despotate of Epirus: Thomas Preljubović	Despotate of Arta	Inconclusive: As a part of Epirus is overrun by Albanians, the city of Ioannina asked Simeon Uroš for protection, and he sends Thomas Preljubović as a new Despot of Epirus, establishing Serbian administration of the city of Ioannina in 1368; Peter Losha leads Albanians in the long siege of Ioannina, which ends in a peace and marriage agreement
Balšići-Thopia War (1368)	Balšići	Thopia	Victory: New invasion of the territory of Karl Thopia by Balšić noble family is successful as Ulcinj is incorporated in their territory
Expension of the Despotate of Serres (1368-1371) Domain of King Vukašin Mrnjavčević and Despot Jovan Uglješa (in 1371)	Uglješa Mrnjavčević	Byzantine Empire Ottoman Empire	Victory: Uglješa Mrnjavčević, the despot of feudal state centered in Serres, significantly increased his holdings; Frequent fighting with raiding Turks, in which despot scores victories; It is most probable that those victories were against smaller raiding parties, which motivates the Despot Uglješa Mrnjavčević to deal with a Turkish threat
Serbian-Ottoman War of 1371: Battle of Maritsa; Map of Balkans in September and Serbian campaign of 1371	Serbian Empire: Vukašin of Serbia; Uglješa Mrnjavčević	Ottoman Empire	Defeat: The diplomatic action of Uglješa Mrnjavčević to form a grand Christian alliance to drive the Turks out of the Balkans fails, with only his brother answering the call; The army of the two brothers was large, but nowhere near the claim of 60 000 that was reported by later sources; Serbian army was decisively defeated and the two brothers died in the battle, leading to the loss of southern Serbian lands; Collapse of the Serbian Empire

== The time of regional lords (1371–1402) ==
Conflict	Combatant 1	Combatant 2	Results
Albanian-Epirote War (1374–1375) Despotate Arta under Peter Loscha and Despotate under Gjin Bua Shpata between 1359 and 1374	Despotate of Epirus: Thomas Preljubović	Despotate of Arta	Inconclusive: After the plague that killed Peter Losha, Gjin Bua Shpata leads new attacks against Ioannina, raiding its countryside; Peace and marriage agreement between the warring parties
Albanian-Epirote War (1377)	Despotate of Epirus: Thomas Preljubović	Despotate of Arta: Malakasioi	Victory: Albanian chieftain named Gjin Phrates led an army of Malakassaioi in an attack on the city on September 14, 1377, however, he was defeated and triumphantly paraded around the streets while captured soldiers were sold into slavery; First victory of Thomas Preljubović over Albanians
Invasion of Acarnania by the Order of Knights of the Hospital of Saint John of Jerusalem (1378)	Despotate of Epirus: Thomas Preljubović; Despotate of Arta: Gjin Bua Shpata	Knights Hospitaller: Juan Fernández de Heredia	Victory: Serbian-Albanian alliance defeats the Frankish forces led by Juan Fernández de Heredia, who himself gets captured and sold; Albanians recapture the territory taken by the Knights Hospitaller
Albanian-Epirote War (1379)	Despotate of Epirus: Thomas Preljubović	Despotate of Arta: Malakasioi; Local Bulgarians and Vlachs	Victory: Malakasioi amphibious and land attack on Ioannina, although planned well with the help of a local traitor, was defeated, and the captives were brutally treated by the Despot Thomas Preljubović; After this siege, the attack of Gjin Bua Shpata on Ioannina was defeated too, Thomas Preljubović brutalized prisoners; Thomas Preljubović goes down in history as the Albanitoktonos, the slayer of Albanians
Ottoman invasion of the Principality of Moravian Serbia (1381): Battle of Dubravnica; States in the Central Balkans that emerged after dissolution of Serbian Empire in the 14th century (1373-1395)	Moravian Serbia	Ottoman Empire	Victory: The incursion of Turkish troops into the Principality of Moravian Serbia, probably after military operations in Bulgaria; Serbian forces of Prince Lazar, led by commanders Vitomir and Crep defeated the invading Ottoman Turks of Sultan Murad I in the battle of Dubravnica
Albanian-Epirote War (1381–84)	Despotate of Epirus: Thomas Preljubović; Ottoman Empire	Despotate of Arta: Malakasioi; Local Bulgarians and Vlachs	Victory: In 1381, Thomas II Preljubović, accompanied by Ottoman auxiliary forces, launched an invasion of the Despotate of Arta; He is successful and managed to expand his control in Dryinopolis, Velas, Boursina, Krezounista, Dragomi and Vagenetia and most of the land previously under the control of the Malakasioi tribe
War between Prince Lazar and the Kingdom of Hungary (1382) Fresco of Prince Lazar Hrebeljanović in the Ravanica Monastery, Serbia	Moravian Serbia	Kingdom of Hungary	Victory: Prince Lazar established himself as the most powerful lord after the fall of the Serbian Empire, and expanded his territory north to the Danube river, while still being the vassal of King Louis I of Hungary; When King Louis dies, Prince Lazar declares independence and attacks Golubac and Belgrade, and crosses the Sava river; Although attacks on Golubac and Belgrade fail, Prince Lazar becomes an independent ruler
Balšići-Thopia War (1385): Battle of Savra	Balšići	Thopia: Ottoman Empire	Defeat: Balša II successfully invades territories of Karl Thopia, managing to conquer Durazzo; However, with the help of the Turkish army, Balša II is defeated and killed in the battle of Savra, and Karl Thopia restores control of the lost territory; Loss of the Albanian territories held by Balšići
Ottoman invasion of the Principality of Moravian Serbia (1386): Battle of Pločnik	Moravian Serbia	Ottoman Empire	Victory: Large-scale invasion of the realm of Prince Lazar led personally by Murad I; Ottomans conquer Niš, an important strategic town and logistical center, which enables their future conflicts; However, Ottoman invasion is stopped at Pločnik, Prince Lazar strengthens defenses of his realm; Prelude of the Battle of Kosovo
Ottoman invasion of the Principality of Moravian Serbia (1389): Battle of Kosovo; Battle of Kosovo 1389, old Russian miniature (Facial chronicle of Ivan IV)	Moravian Serbia: Kingdom of Bosnia; Realm of Vuk Branković	Ottoman Empire: Beylik of Isfendiyar	Inconclusive: The Ottoman invasion led personally by Murad I met strong resistance in the form of a Christian coalition led by Prince Lazar, leading to one of the largest battles of the late medieval times; Ottomans had a significant numerical advantage and more reserves that were not called to participate in the invasion, while the entirety of Serbian forces were called upon; Both Murad I and Prince Lazar are killed during the battle, and the bulk of both armies is destroyed; Bayezid I, son of Murad I, upon hearing of his father's death, murders his brother, Yakub Çelebi, securing the title of Sultan; Remaining Ottomans retreat from Serbian territory, however, less numerous Serbian forces are significantly depleted
War between the Principality of Moravian Serbia and the Kingdom of Hungary (1389-1392) Golubac Fortress	Moravian Serbia: Ottoman Empire	Kingdom of Hungary	Victory: Sigismund of Luxembourg invades Serbian territory right after the Battle of Kosovo, and depleted Serb are not able to put up effective resistance; Caught between the two expansionist powers, Prince Stefan Lazarević had to act diplomatically to save his state; The State Assembly with the support of Serbian Patriarch Spyridon (1379–1389), decided on the conclusion of peace and acceptance of the supremacy of Sultan Bayezid I; Serbians, with the help of Ottoman troops, pushed Hungarians out, recaptured the lost territory, and continued raids into the Kingdom of Hungary; The Kingdom of Hungary temporarily lost Golubac to Turks twice, but in 1382, Sigismund of Luxembourg kicked the Turks out and conducted a raid deep into Serbian territory
Ottoman invasion of lands of Vuk Branković and Đurađ II Balšić(1389-1392) Vuk Branković coat of arms	District of Branković Principality of Zeta	Ottoman Empire	Defeat: Serbian lands that were not a part of the realm of Stefan Lazarević were a target of Turkish conquest; Both Vuk Branković and Đurađ II Balšić suffer significant territorial losses and become vassals of the Ottoman Empire
Invasion of Albanian lands by Konstantin Balšić (1394)	Konstantin Balšić: Ottoman Empire	Albanian noble families	Victory: Konstantin Balšić, as an Ottoman vassal, invades and captures Dagnum and establishes supremacy over local Albanian nobles
Zetan-Ottoman War (1395) Principality of Zeta after collapse of the Serbian Empire in the 14th century	Principality of Zeta: Republic of Venice	Ottoman Empire: Konstantin Balšić	Victory: Đurađ II Balšić breaks his Ottoman vassalage and successfully invades northern Albania while Ottomans are busy with their campaign in Wallachia; Principality of Zeta conquers Skadar and other territories, defeating Konstantin Balšić in the process; However, Đurađ II is aware that he can not stop further Turkish invasions, so he offers the newly acquired territory to the Republic of Venice
Ottoman invasion of Wallachia (1395): Battle of Rovine; Map Of Wallachia	Ottoman Empire: Stefan Lazarević; Marko Mrnjavčević; Konstantin Dejanović; Konstantin Balšić	Wallachia Kingdom of Hungary	Defeat: Great invasion force led personally by Bayezid I, which included many of his Serbian vassals, was defeated by Wallachian forcces led by Mircea I in the Battle of Rovine; Many of Ottoman vassals died in this battle, and Bayezid I annexed their territories after retreating from Wallachia; Sigismund of Luxembourg successfully invades Ottoman territories after the battle, giving him hope for a future crusade against the Ottoman Empire
Ottoman invasion of lands of Vuk Branković (1396) Realm of Branković was one of the states that emerged from the collapse of the Serbian Empire in the 14th century	District of Branković	Ottoman Empire	Defeat: Ottomans capture the majority of territory held by Vuk Branković
Crusade against the Ottoman Empire (1396): Battle of Nicopolis; Battle of Nicopolis, 1396, Facsimile of a Miniature Conserved in the Topkapi Museum in Istanbul	Ottoman Empire: Moravian Serbia	Crusade: Holy Roman Empire; Kingdom of France; Duchy of Burgundy; Kingdom of Hungary; Voivodship of Transylvania; Kingdom of Croatia; Principality of Wallachia; Knights Hospitaller; Republic of Venice; Republic of Genoa; Bulgarian Empire; Teutonic Knights; Byzantine Empire; County of Cilli; District of Branković; Kingdom of Hungary	Victory: Great crusader army crosses the Danube river and captures Vidin; Bayezid I found himself in a predicament, but bad organization of the Crusade and Western unfamiliarity with the Turkish battle tactics worked in his favor; In the Battle of Nicopolis Crusaders suffered a decisive defeat, with the Serbian contingent of Stefan Lazarević, consisting of heavily armored cavalry, being the decisive factor; Crusaders are driven back, and Ottomans, together with the troops of Stefan Lazarević, conduct a large-scale raiding operation in the Kingdom of Hungary; Vuk Branković is captured and the majority of his territory is given to Stefan Lazarević
Ottoman-Timurid War (1402): Battle of Ankara; Ottoman Sultan Bayezid I and the Emir of the Timurid Empire, Timur, after the Battle of Angora in 1402	Ottoman Empire: Moravian Serbia; District of Branković; Other Ottoman vassals	Timurid Empire: Aq Qoyunlu; Germiyanids	Defeat: One of the greatest battles of the Middle Ages with high consequences for the Ottoman state; Although Timur was more interested in expanding into Mesopotamia and Egypt, Bayezid's demand for tribute offended this mighty ruler, moving him to start a campaign against Ottomans; The battle was catastrophic for Ottomans, however, a contingent of Serbian knights fought heroically, even when surrounded, defeating several Mongol assaults; Serbian knights break off the encirclement and return from the battlefield; While returning, Stefan Lazarević visits Constantinople, where John VII Palaiologos, who was ruling the Byzantine Empire in the absence of Manuel II Palaiologos, awards him with the prestigious title of Despot; Beginning of the Serbian Despotate

== Serbian Despotate (1402–1459) ==
Conflict	Combatant 1	Combatant 2	Results
Serbian-Ottoman War (1402): Battle of Tripolje	Serbian Despotate: Principality of Zeta	Ottoman Empire: District of Branković	Victory: After Stefan Lazarević returned from the Byzantine Empire to the Principality of Zeta, he organized an army to return to his realm, as Ottomans were actively hunting him down with the help of Branković noble family; Despite avoiding major roads and evading Turks, battle was inevitable and the two armies clashed in Tripolje, a place near Gračanica; The tactical superiority and leadership abilities of Stefan Lazarević bring him victory over the joint Ottoman-Branković army; Stefan Lazarević takes control of the Serbian Despotate
Serbian-Ottoman War (1404)	Serbian Despotate	Ottoman Empire: District of Branković	Victory: This conflict is a part of the centralization effort of Stefan Lazarević as he went on the offensive against Ottoman-held cities and the realm of Brankovič, achieving significant success and consolidating his power; Despite the warfare against Turkish garrisons, Stefan Lazarević maintains his good relations with Sultan Süleyman Çelebi
First Scutari War (1405–1413)	Principality of Zeta: Serbian Despotate	Republic of Venice	Inconclusive: Growing strength of the Serbian Despotate caused concern in the Republic of Venice, which soon started the oppression of its Orthodox subjects; Balša III, provoked by these actions, attacked Venetian territory, starting a long war that ended in indecisive peace treaty in 1413
War between the Serbian Despotate and the alliance of Ottoman Empire and Vuk Lazarević (1409-1410): Battle of Kosmidion	Serbian Despotate: Kingdom of Hungary; Musa Çelebi	Ottoman Empire: Vuk Lazarević	Victory: Vuk Lazarević, the ambitious brother of Stefan Lazarević, with substantial Ottoman help in the form of an army numbering 30,000 men, attacked the Serbian Despotate; Serbian Despotate, with the aid of the Kingdom of Hungary, put up fierce resistance, but was pushed to Belgrade, at which point Süleyman Çelebi demanded the surrender of Stefan Lazarević, but it was refused; Vuk Branković probably gained southern Serbian lands, however, the fighting continued when Musa Çelebi attacked Süleyman Çelebi; After the defeat of the Serbian-Musa alliance at the Battle of Kosmidion, Süleyman Çelebi approves another invasion of Vuk Lazarević of the Serbian Despotate, however, he gets captured and executed by Musa Çelebi; Stefan Lazarević, after the death of his brother, reoccupied all the lost lands; Part of the Ottoman Interregnum
Invasion of the Serbian Despotate by Musa Çelebi (1412)	Serbian Despotate	Ottoman Empire	Victory: Musa Çelebi, after defeating and killing his brother, Süleyman Çelebi, turns against his former allies and invades the Serbian Despotate; Ottoman army breaks into Serbian lands and cause much devastation, however, they are unable to conquer Novo Brdo, which was defended with the help of brave Ragusan citizens who were frequently trading in the city; Ottoman army retreats when the news of arrival of the army of Stefan Lazarević reaches them; Part of the Ottoman Interregnum
Coalition against Musa Çelebi (1413): Battle of Çamurlu	Serbian Despotate: Kingdom of Bosnia; Kingdom of Hungary; Mehmed Çelebi: Dulkadirids	Ottoman Empire	Victory: Musa Çelebi attacked the Serbian Despotate again in 1413, causing large-scale devastation, but failed to capture Stalać and decisively defeat Stefan Lazarević; With Mehmed Çelebi, Bosnian and Hungarian allies, Stefan Lazarević organizes the attack on Musa Çelebi; In the decisive Battle of Çamurlu, Musa is defeated and killed; Part of the Ottoman Interregnum
Second Scutari War (1419–1426)	Principality of Zeta: Serbian Despotate	Republic of Venice	Inconclusive: Another long war that was started by the attack of Balša III on the Venetian territory; Tide changes several times during the war; Balša III passed the rule of Zeta to Despot Stefan Lazarević; Serbian Despotate continues the war and in 1426 concludes peace with Venice
Hussite Wars(1419–1434): Battle of Trnava (1430)	Kingdom of Hungary: Serbian Despotate	Hussites	Victory: Serbian troops first participated in the Hussite Wars when Emperor Sigismund of Luxembourg requested them from Despot Stefan Lazarević; Their first enrolment was in the December of 1421 and lasted until the January of 1422; Serbian troops also participated in the Hungarian army in the later parts of the conflict; Victory for the Serbian allies
First invasion of the Serbian Despotate by Murad II (1425)	Serbian Despotate: Kingdom of Hungary; Wallachia	Ottoman Empire	Victory: Despite maintaining peace with the Ottomans during the reign of Mehmed I, Despot Stefan Lazarević found himself in a difficult position when Murad II became the new Sultan; This drove Despot Stefan Lazarević to strengthen his ties with the Kingdom of Hungary and improve the defenses of his country; Both sides prepared for the upcoming war, which finally started after the failed diplomatic attempt of Despot Stefan Lazarević to stop it; The Ottoman army led by Sultan Murad II invaded the Serbian Despotate and reached Kruševac, causing major devastation, however, they met stiff resistance from the joint Serbian-Hungarian forces; Murad II accepts a peace proposal from Stefan Lazarević; Although the exact content of the peace deal is not known, the Ottoman army retreated from the Serbian Despotate
Second invasion of the Serbian Despotate by Murad II (1427)	Serbian Despotate	Ottoman Empire	Defeat: Serbian Despotate found itself in a difficult position after the death of Despot Stefan Lazarević; Murad II invades the Serbian Despotate, now ruled by Đurađ Branković, and captures Niš and Kruševac, however, the main goal of the campaign is Novo Brdo, a rich and well-defended Serbian city; The Ottoman lay a long siege of the city, however, they failed to take it and retreat from the Serbian Despotate; Despite this setback, Ottomans kept Niš and Kruševac, and Đurađ Branković recognizes the supremacy of Sultan Murad II
Siege of Thessalonica (1422–1430)	Ottoman Empire: Serbian Despotate	Byzantine Empire Republic of Venice	Victory: Son of Despot Đurađ Branković, Grgur Branković, leads the contingent of Serbian troops that fought for Ottomans under vassal obligations; Grgur Branković fought well, winning him favors with Murad II
Invasion of Zeta by Stešan Balšić Maramonte (1430)	Serbian Despotate Republic of Venice	Stefan Maramonte: Ottoman Empire; Koja Zaharia; Little Tanush	Victory: Stefan Maramonte, with the help of Turkish axillaries and Albanian nobility, invades Zeta, a region that was split between the Serbian Despotate and the Republic of Venice; Stefan Maramonte achieves success and the city of Drivast surrenders to him, but he cannot capture its fortress which was defended by the Serbian troops; The invasion ends in failure
Albanian revolt of 1432–1436	Ottoman Empire: Serbian Despotate	Albanian nobility: Kingdom of Hungary	Victory: The fake rumor that Murad II died caused an uprising in Albania against Ottoman rule; To suppress it, Ottomans call upon Đurađ Branković to support them with troops in the suppression of the uprising; However, Albanians defeat invading Ottomans in several battles, and even go on the offensive against the Serbian Despotate, but they are unable to capture Drivast; Despite this success and the help of the Kingdom of Hungary, the uprising is ultimately suppressed
Third invasion of the Serbian Despotate by Murad II (1437)	Serbian Despotate	Ottoman Empire	Defeat: Ottomans suffered a great defeat against the Kingdom of Hungary when Hungarians and their allies broke into their territory and plundered it; Đurađ Branković tried to stay neutral in this conflict, but a part of the Christian army passed through the Serbian Despotate when returning back home, which caused suspicion of Murad II; Ottomans invade and cause great harm to the country, and Đurađ Branković, unable to resist the might of the Ottoman army, surrenders Braničevo to Turks
Fourth invasion of the Serbian Despotate by Murad II (1438-1439)	Serbian Despotate	Ottoman Empire	Defeat: Murad II personally leads the Ottoman army into the Serbian Despotate; He occupies almost every part of it and lays siege to Smederevo, which was defended bravely by Grgur Branković and Thomas Kantakouzenos but eventually they ran out of supplies, Before the siege of the last Serbian stronghold, Đurađ Branković and the royal court managed to escape to the Kingdom of Hungary; Fall of the Serbian Despotate and the first fall of the Serbian Medieval state under foreign rule
Siege of Belgrade (1440)	Kingdom of Hungary: Serbian defenders	Ottoman Empire	Victory: Boosted by previous successes, Mured II launched an invasion of Belgrade, a mighty city that was fortified by Stefan Lazarević before it was given back to the Kingdom of Hungary; However, Turkish attempt to capture it fails
Siege of Novo Brdo (1440–1441)	Novo Brdo	Ottoman Empire	Defeat: After the long siege, Ottoman forces manage to capture this important city, causing great devastation
First campaign of the Crusade of Varna (1443-1444): Battle of Nish (1443); Battle of Zlatitsa; Battle of Kunovica	Kingdom of Poland Kingdom of Hungary Serbian Despotate Kingdom of Croatia Grand Duchy of Lithuania Crown of Bohemia Principality of Wallachia Bulgarian rebels Kingdom of Bosnia	Ottoman Empire	Victory: A great Crusader army, with a contingent of Serbian infantry and cavalry numbering 8000 men led personally by Đurađ Branković, crosses the Danube river and penetrates deep into Ottoman territory; Đurađ Branković, due to his knowledge of the terrain, led the Crusader forces; Army reaches Niš and decisively defeats the Ottoman army led by Kasım Pasha, after which they advance to Sofia; Due to the harsh conditions and Ottoman resistance at Zlatica, Crusaders retreated, defeating pursuing Ottomans in several battles; The Crusade influenced an uprising in Novo Brdo, but it was quickly suppressed by the Ottomans; Despite the ultimate failure of the Crusade in the battle of Varna that happened later, this campaign proved quite successful for the Đurađ Branković, who will reach the peace agreement with Murad II, which is why he didn't participate in the disastrous second campaign; On the 15th of August 1444, the Serbian Despotate is restored
War between The Serbian Despotate and the Republic of Venice (1448)	Serbian Despotate: Stefan Crnojević	Republic of Venice	Defeat: Đurađ Branković demands the return of parts of Zeta that was held by the Republic of Venice, but his army is defeated by Venetians who were using cunning tactics
Serbian involvement in the Fall of Constantinople (1453)]]	Ottoman Empire: Serbian Despotate	Byzantine Empire: Latin mercenaries and volunteers	Victory: Despite his ambition to remarry his daughter Mara to Constantine XI, financing the defense of Constantinople in the past, and his personal affection towards Greeks, Đurađ Branković had to send troops to help the Ottoman conquest under vassal obligations; Serbian troops didn't significantly participate in the siege, apart from engineers who were doing earthwork; Fall of the city sends shockwaves across Serbia and Christian Europe, and, despite participating on the winning side, it foreshadows the fall of the Despotate
Uprising of Stefan Crnojević (1452-1453)	Serbian Despotate	Stefan Crnojević: Republic of Venice	Defeat: Stefan Crnojević rises against the Serbian Despotate with the help of the Republic of Venice; Fighting under the Venetian flag, he takes control of the majority of Zeta and defeats two armies sent by Đurađ Branković; Dominance of the Crnojevići family in Zeta until its downfall
First invasion of the Serbian Despotate by Mehmed the Conqueror (1454): Battle of Ostrvica; Battle of Leskovac; Battle of Kruševac	Serbian Despotate: Kingdom of Hungary	Ottoman Empire	Victory: Mehmed the Conqueror breaks truce with the Serbian Despotate and invades it; The Ottoman army is divided into several parts and quickly overwhelms the Despotate, Đurađ Branković flees to the Kingdom of Hungary to seek help, which is provided by John Hunyadi; Ostravica, despite fierce resistance, falls to the Ottomans, but Mehmed II fails to capture Smederevo, after which the main Ottoman army retreats with much plunder and slaves; The joint Serbian-Hungarian army defeats numerous Turkish armies that are left in Serbia and continue the plunder into Ottoman territory; While Mehmed II didn't manage to conquer the Despotate of Serbia, this invasion was the beginning of its final fall
Second invasion of the Serbian Despotate by Mehmed the Conqueror (1455)	Serbian Despotate: Kingdom of Hungary	Ottoman Empire	Defeat: Mehmed II invades the Serbian Despotate once again, achieving significant success; Ottoman army captures Novo Brdo and the whole southern territory of the Despotate, causing great harm to its population, massacring and enslaving many; Among the enslaved populace many men are drafted into janissaries, however, after finding out that Serbians immediately started to conspire to kill him, Murad II bans them from his court; With the fall of the southern parts of the Serbian Despotate, the link between it and Zeta is lost
Third invasion of the Serbian Despotate by Mehmed the Conqueror (1456): Siege of Belgrade (1456)	Serbian Despotate: Kingdom of Hungary	Ottoman Empire	Victory: Mehmed II gathers a grand army equipped with a large artillery arsenal and advances towards the Danube, however, Đurađ Branković also strengthens the defenses of Smederevo with supplies and artillery; Ottomans, despite heavy casualties, fail to take Smederevo, but continue to advance towards Belgrade; This siege ends in a great Christian victory, with Serbian troops contributing greatly in defending the city and fighting the Ottoman river navy
Serbian intervention in the straggle between King Ladislaus the Posthumous and barons (1457): Siege of Belgrade (1456)	Ladislaus the Posthumous: Serbian Despotate	Barons that opposed King of Hungary	Victory: Lazar Branković attacks the enemies of the Hungarian king and captures several cities on the left bank of the Danube, marking the first expansion of the Serbian state across this river; Despite the defeat of the Serbian army, the Serbian Despotate keeps the captured territory
Fall of the Serbian Despotate (1458-1459)	Serbian Despotate	Ottoman Empire Kingdom of Hungary Kingdom of Bosnia	Defeat: Lazar Branković dies without an heir, leading to the infighting in the Serbian Despotate and foreign invasions; Kingdom of Bosnia captures Srebrenica and several fortresses; Kingdom of Hungary captures newly-acquired Serbian holdings on the left bank of the Danube; Ottomans, after participating in the failed coup d'état against the Serbian ruling council, invade the crippled Despotate and reach the border with the Kingdom of Hungary; The last despot of Serbia, Stephan Tomašević, surrenders the last Serbian stronghold, Smederevo, to the Ottomans; On June 20 of 1459 the Serbian Despotate ceased to exist

== See also ==
- Medieval Serbian army
- List of wars involving Serbia
