= Medieval Serbian army =

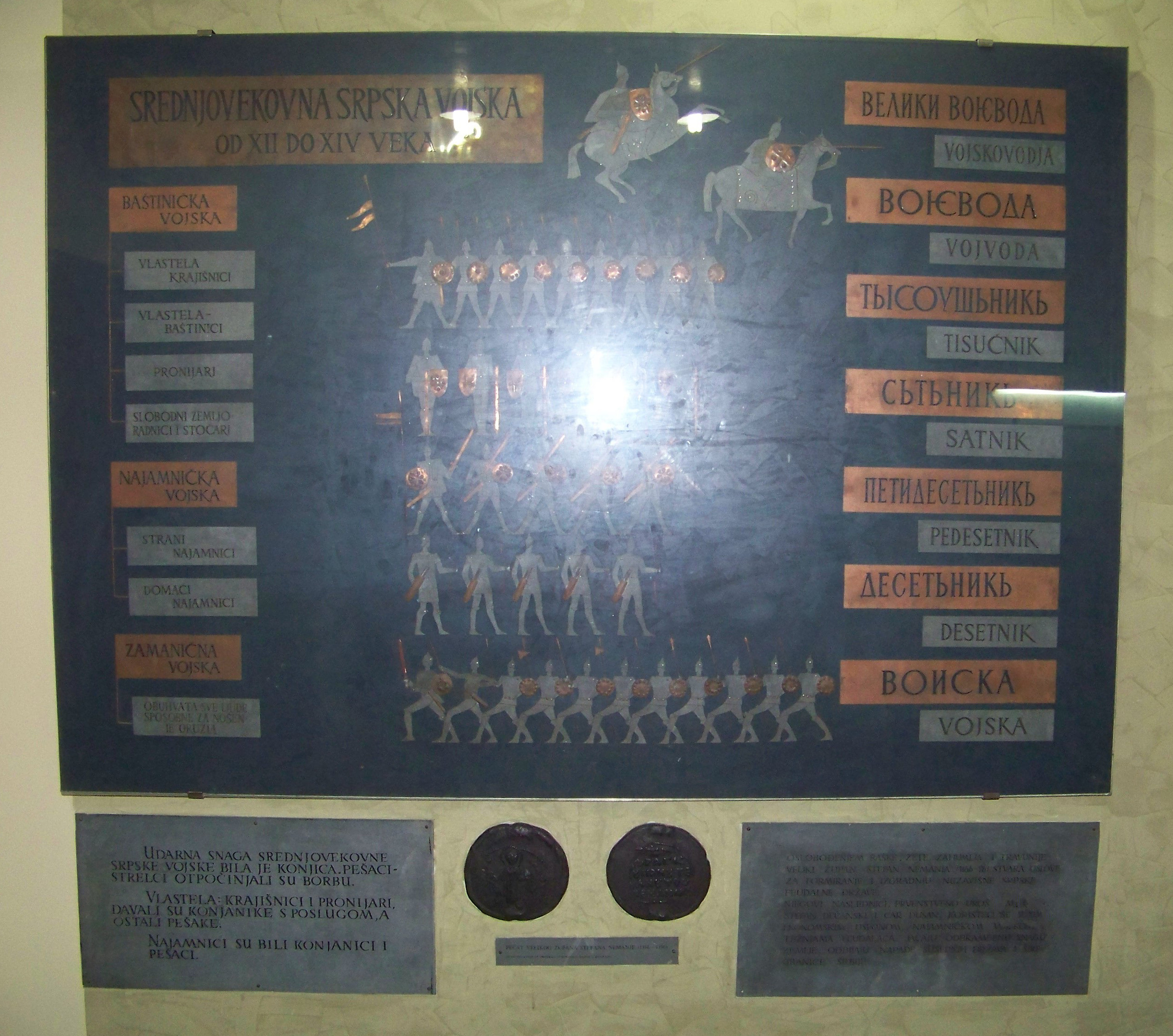
- Structure of Serbian army in the Middle Ages
- Active: 839 – 1540
- Disbanded: 1540 (Ottoman conquest)
- Size: Unknown

Commanders
- Commander-in-chief: Serbian ruler

Serbia in the Middle Ages had an army that was well known for its strength and was among the strongest in the Balkans prior to the Ottoman conquest of Europe. Prior to the 14th century, the army consisted of European-style noble cavalry armed with bows and lances (replaced with crossbows in the 14th century) and infantry armed with spears, javelins and bows. With the economic growth from mining, mercenary knights from Western Europe were recruited to finalize and increase the effectiveness of the army, especially throughout 14th century.

== History ==
=== Early Middle Ages ===
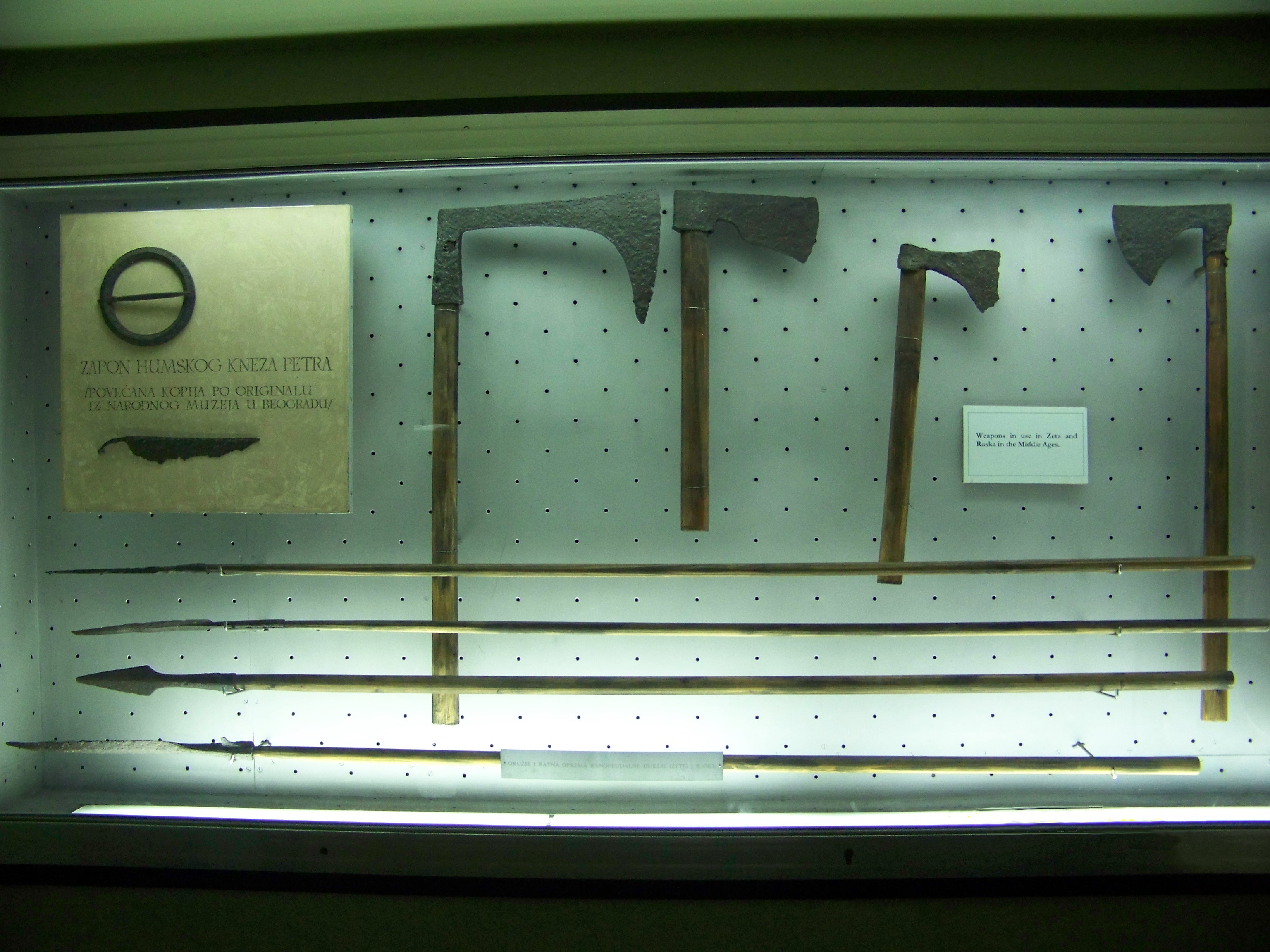
9th century axes

Between 839 and 842 the Bulgar Khan Presian invaded inland parts of the Serbian territory, the two having lived peacefully sharing a common frontier up until that point. The cause for the invasion is unclear. It led to a war that lasted three years, in which the Bulgars were decisively defeated. In the mid 850s the Bulgarians under Boris I made another unsuccessful attempt to subdue the Serbs. In the beginning of the 10th century Simeon I launched several campaigns against the Serbs who were acting as Byzantine allies and by 925 he managed to conquer Serbia completely but the Bulgarian rule was short-lived. Samuel of Bulgaria subjected the Serbs for a second time in 1009 or 1010 after he defeated their ruler Jovan Vladimir.

10th-century Byzantine military manuals mention chonsarioi, light cavalry formations recruited in the Balkans, especially Serbs, "ideal for scouting and raiding". These units are considered a precursor of Hussar cavalry formations later found in Hungarian and Polish armies.

=== Late Middle Ages ===
==== 12th century ====
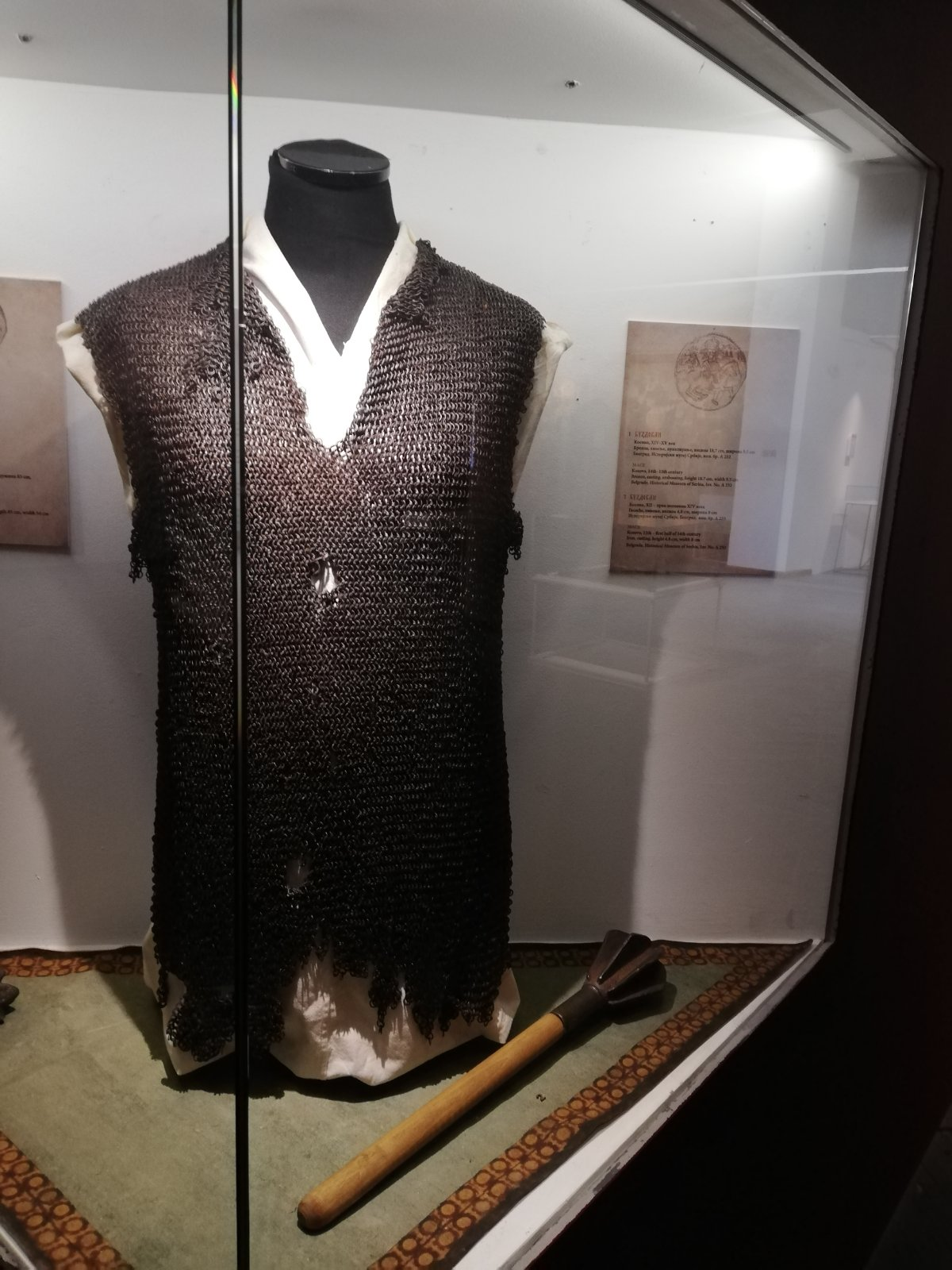
Medieval Serbian chainamail shirt

The writings of John Kinnamos and other contemporary Byzantine sources (Anna Komnene, Niketas Choniates, Eustathios of Thessalonica, Michael of Thessalonica) of the twelfth century, gives substantial data concerning Serbian armament and tactics.

- Both Kinnamos and Michael of Thessalonica attest to Serbians' usage of spears and long shields in the twelfth century. Kinnamos specifically mentions the usage of swords by Serbians. Regarding the spears and shields, the words borata and aspibaz are used; for the swords, the term xifoz. All three of these terms, both by the writings of Kinnamos and contemporary Byzantine sources, refer to these armaments in generalities. Then, by this terminology alone, it's not possible to determine the exact type of spears, swords, or shields employed by the Serbs during the twelfth century. Regarding their swords, one clue is given by N. Chionates, who uses the term romfaia to describe the swords used by Serbians during this period. This term is typically reserved for single-edged swords in Byzantine sources, and we can therefore reasonably conclude that Serbians were using some kind of single-edged sword in battle at this time.
- Kinnamos doesn't mention Serbian usage of bow and arrows, although Serbian usage of arrows is known from the previous epochs. This circumstance may be attributed to the fragmented character of Kinnamos' data concerning foreign nations, or to Kinnamos' personal impression that arrows didn't play vital role in Serbian warfare.
- Kinnamos doesn't mention armor among Serbs, but when talking about battle of Tara (1150) he mentions that Serbs were well armed using word katafraktoz, usually meaning armored. Presence of armor among Serbs of the twelfth century is attested by Michael of Thessalonica, who mentions Serbs using mail face-coverings. We know that such mail masks were usually an integral part of mail hauberks. Kinnamos mentions Serbian hoplites in fortress of Galič; in Kinnamos' writings, term 'hoplite' denotes heavy armed and armored infantryman, which indicates the presence of armor among Serbs during the twelfth century. Eustathios of Thessalonica also mentions hoplites in Serbian army.
- Concerning Serbian tactics, Kinnamos offers some interesting fragments. When describing one part of the Serbian army's tactics in the battle of Tara, Kinnamos shows them fighting in infantry units. The Serbian infantry of the twelfth century is attested by Eustathios of Thessalonica; importantly, Eustathios mentions Serbian cavalry, led by Nemanja. When describing the battle of Tara, Kinnamos mentions that some parts of the Serbian army used tactics including ambushes and sudden strikes. Serbians' use of ambush is attested by Eustathios of Thessalonica, who mentions Nemanja employing such techniques.

==== 14th century ====
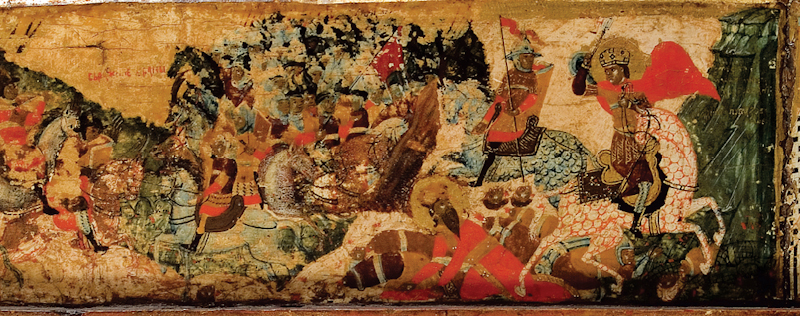
Battle of Velbazhd in 1330, depicted in 15th century fresco in Visoki Dečani Monastery

Serbia defeated the Bulgarian Empire in the Battle of Velbazhd in 1330, becoming a military superpower during the middle part of the 14th century under the dynamic Stephen Uroš IV Dušan (1331–55), who created the Serbian Empire. It included Macedonia, Albania, Epirus and Thessaly, reaching from the Drina and Danube rivers as far south and east as the Gulf of Patras and the Rhodope Mountains by 1350. A large part of this expansion was at the expense of the Byzantine Empire. Dušan set his sights on the Byzantine capital of Constantinople itself, dividing his lands into 'Serbia' and 'Romania'. Dušan was crowned Emperor (Tsar) of Serbs and Romans in 1346. He modeled his court on that of Constantinople, calling his officials by Byzantine titles such as caesar, despot, sebastokrator and logotet (logothete). However, following his death, the Serbian Empire gradually disintegrated under his successor Stephen Uroš V (1355–71). One Byzantine chronicler noted with evident satisfaction that the Serbian nobility were soon divided into '10,000 factions', while John VI Kantakouzenos wrote that Dušan's empire fell 'into a thousand pieces'.

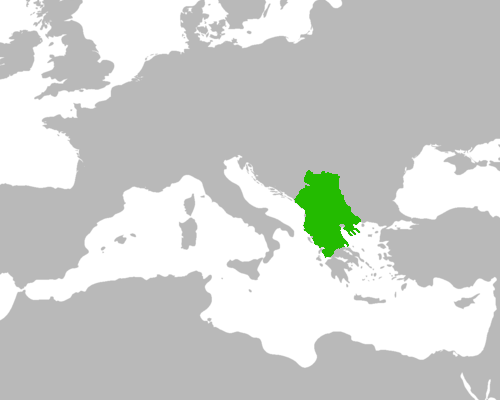
Emperor Dušan's Serbia, ca. 1350

After 1363, Vukašin Mrnjavčević became the most powerful noble in the Serbian Empire; he controlled lands in the south of the empire, primarily in Macedonia. He was defeated and killed by the Ottoman Turks in 1371 in the Battle of Marica. In 1371, Prince Lazar Hrebeljanović emerged as the most powerful Serbian lord. He created the largest state on the territory of the disintegrated Serbian Empire; his state is known in historiography as Moravian Serbia. Its government and army were better organized than those of the domains of the other Serbian lords. In 1386, Prince Lazar rebuffed the Ottoman Sultan Murad I at Pločnik, a site southwest of the city of Niš.

An Ottoman army led by Sultan Murad, estimated at between 27,000 and 30,000 men, arrived in June 1389 on the Kosovo Field near Priština. The Ottomans were met by the forces commanded by Prince Lazar, estimated at between 15,000 and 20,000 men, with a higher estimate up to 25,000, A higher estimate places the size of Murad's army up to 40,000 and Lazar's up to 25,000 troops. which consisted of the prince's own troops, Vuk Branković's troops, and a contingent sent by the King Tvrtko I of Bosnia. In the Battle of Kosovo, both Prince Lazar and Sultan Murad lost their lives. The battle was tactically inconclusive, but the mutual heavy losses were devastating only for the Serbs, who had brought to Kosovo almost all of their fighting strength. Lazar was succeeded by his eldest son Stefan Lazarević, who became an Ottoman vassal in the summer of 1390. Vuk Branković accepted Ottoman suzerainty in 1392. The battle of Kosovo was one of the large battles of late medieval times. In comparison, in the battle of Agincourt (1415) even by assuming the higher estimate of army size as correct, around 10,000 fewer soldiers were engaged. Later, Stefan Lazarević participated on the Ottoman side in the Battle of Rovine in 1395, the Battle of Nicopolis in 1396, and the Battle of Ankara in 1402.

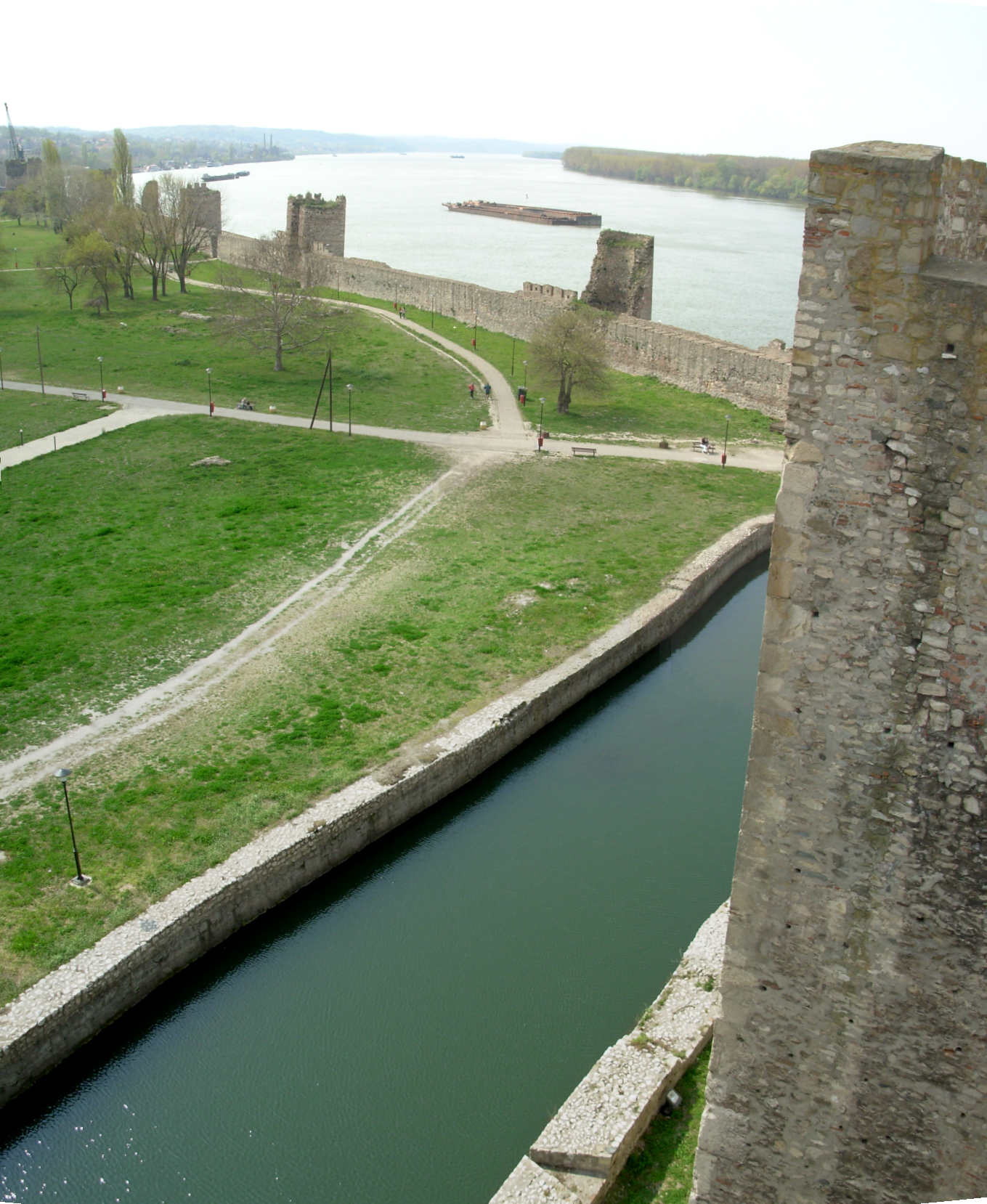
Smederevo Fortress constructed in 1429

==== 15th century ====
Stefan Lazarević was granted the title of Despot by the Byzantine Emperor, and he ceased to be an Ottoman vassal in 1402. He introduced modern western style knight warfare and knight tournaments. And there were firearms already in use, especially in armored cavalry. He ruled Serbia as Despot from 1402 to 1427. He was fighting against the Ottomans, and later he supported Mehmet I rise to power in the Battle of Çamurlu.

After him the Branković dynasty came to power. They continued developing modern military battle tactics. Despot Đurađ Branković who ruled Serbia from 1427 to 1456, constructed the Smederevo Fortress, which was the largest medieval lowland type of fortress in Europe. This fortress had 24 towers and a citadel with 50m tall towers. Most of the fortress remains intact until nowadays.

== Organization ==
The Serbian army was feudal in nature, though its system of military landholding was inherited from the Byzantine pronoia rather than the Western European fief. The pronoia itself - hereditary by some accounts, non-hereditary by others - is only first recorded in Serbia under that name in 1299 (the Serbs spelt it pronija, or pronya, and called its holder a pronijar), but even from as early as Stefan Nemanja reign (1186–96) every able-bodied man possessing a bashtina (a grant of hereditary freehold land, the holder being called a bashtinik or voynic) had been obliged to attend the army whenever required, only monastic tenants being exempted in exchange for performing part-time garrison duties in local fortresses and fortified monasteries. The building and maintenance (gradozadanje) of such fortresses, and equally the maintenance of their permanent garrisons (gradobljudenlje) was an additional aspect of the feudal responsibilities of the population of each Župa (district), who were also responsible for guarding their own frontier. The holders of both bashtinas and pronijas constituted the nobility (though many of the former were only upper-class peasants), and these were the principal native element of every Serbian army, serving as heavy cavalry (the proniiars) and infantry (the voynici), In fact most armies included only the nobility (the vlastelini, or 'holders of power') and their retinues, maintained at their own expense, but in times of emergency the arriere-ban, called the Zamanitchka Voyska ('All Together'), would be summoned. As elsewhere, this comprised all the nobility and every able-bodied freeman.

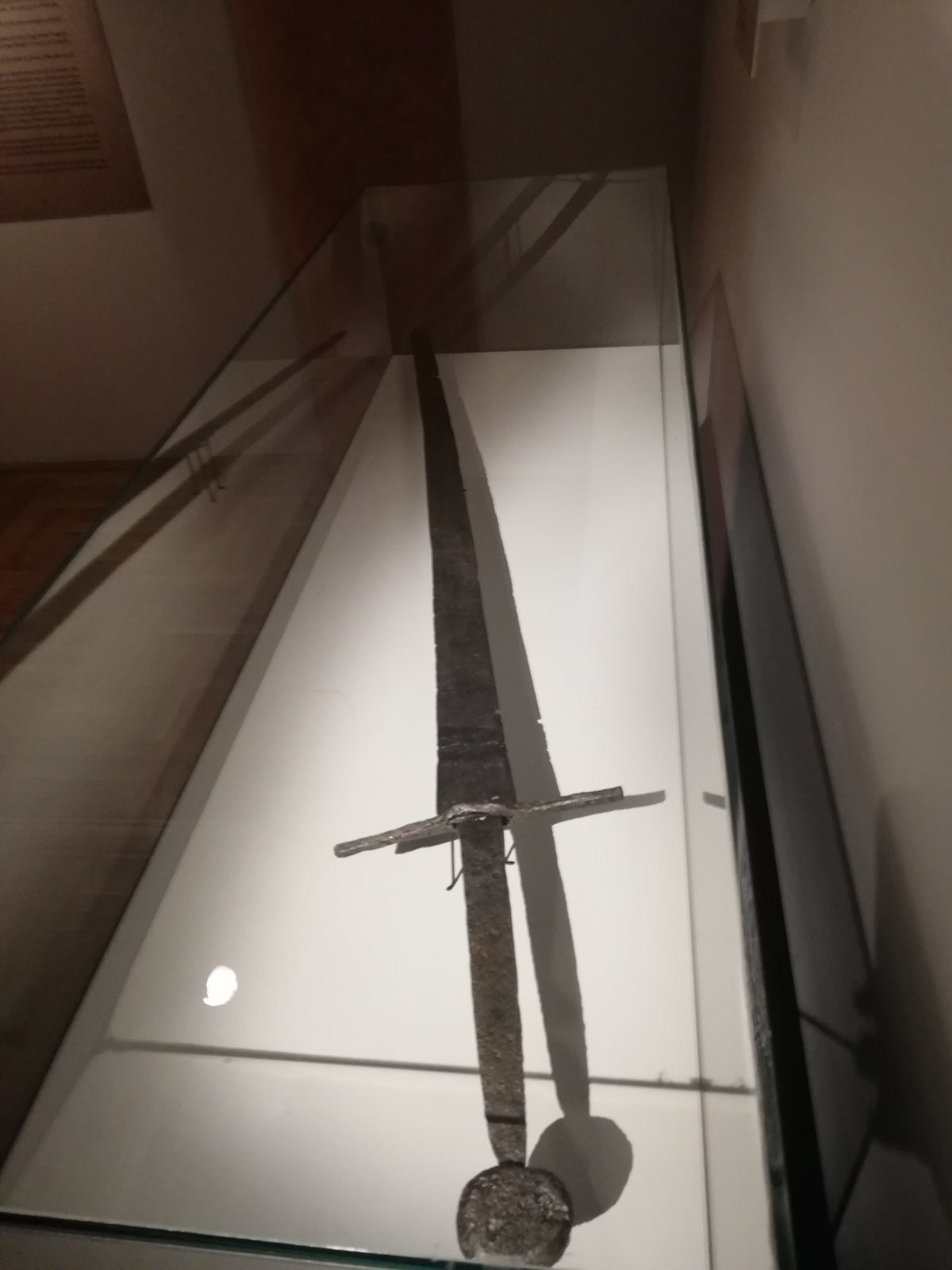
Medieval Serbian sword

In border regions all land-grants appear to have been called krayina and their holders vlastele krayishnik ('border lords'), whose duty it was to guard the frontier. Dušan's Code of 1349 (the Zakonik, extended and completed in 1354) actually states that any damage inflicted by an invading army had to be compensated for by the border-lord through whose lands the enemy had entered, another article stating that similar pillaging committed by brigands had to be repaid seven-fold. The Byzantine chronicler Gregoras, as ambassador for Andronikos III to Emperor Dusan, encountered some krayishnici (men of a border- lord) on crossing the frontier. He wrote: 'When we passed the Struma River ... and came into thick woods, we were suddenly surrounded by men clad in black woolen garments, who darted forth from behind trees and rocks like devils out of the earth. They wore no heavy armor, being armed only with spears, battle-axes, and bows and arrows.

From the 11th century on the commander-in-chief of the army was the king (kral), a veliki vojevoda or 'high military chief, equivalent to the Byzantine Grand Domestic, being appointed in his absence. However, since any call to arms had to be approved by the Sabor (the National Assembly) the king actually had limited military power, in effect being no more than a glorified Grand Župan, or elected tribal leader. Although Dušan stripped the Sabor of much of its power, the crown's inclusion of permanent nucleus of mercenaries that was not subject to the assembly's whims had by then already evolved. Under Stephen Uroš II Milutin (1282-1321) these mercenaries included such diverse elements as Cumans; Anatolian Turks (some 1,500 were employed in 1311 from amongst those who had been allied to the Catalans in Thrace and Macedonia); Tartars from South Russia; and Christian Ossetians (Jasi in Serbian and Russian sources) from the Caucasus. However, it was Western European style heavy cavalry which soon came to predominate. As early as 1304 a certain Francisco de Salomone is mentioned in an inscription in Trevise as having distinguished himself in the service of 'Orosius, rex Rascie' (i. e. Uroš, king of Serbia). Stephen Uroš III's army that defeated the Bulgarians at Battle of Velbazhd in 1330 were composed of 15,000 Serbs, 2,000 Italians from the Kingdom of Naples and 1,000 German mercenaries, and it was the latter who seem to have predominated among the mercenaries during Dušan reign. The papal legate to his court reported seeing 300 German mercenaries there under the knight Palman Bracht, who held the rank of capitaneus. In addition we know that the Serbian troops supplied to the Byzantine Emperor, John VI Kantakouzenos, in 1342-43 were Serbs with some German mercenaries, and that the troops garrisoning Beroia in Macedonia in 1341-50 were German mercenaries too. Even at the Battle of Kosovo in 1389 it is significant that many of Lazar mercenaries were German and Hungarian according to a Florentine account, while a mid-15th century Ottoman source reports that his army included Wallachians, Hungarians, Bohemians, Albanians, Bulgarians and Franks, doubtless chiefly mercenaries. Another says he employed many mercenaries from among the Serbians themselves as well as some Hungarians, Bosnians and Albanians. Serbian documents indicate that as well as Germans the other predominant European mercenary elements comprised Spaniards (possibly as many as 1,300-strong at one point) plus Hungarians, Frenchmen, Italians and Swiss. One prominent name to appear in their ranks was that of Philippe de Mézières, in later life Chancellor of Cyprus and one of the last protagonists of the Crusade. Inevitably, in the 15th century Ottoman auxiliaries were also used, for example by Vuk Lazarević against Stephen, 1409-13. In addition to the king or despot, the larger cities also employed some mercenaries of their own to back up their militia.

When the Ottoman hold on Serbia weakened after the Battle of Ankara, Stefan Lazarević took advantage of the situation to establish his independence from the Turks. Recognizing the king of Hungary as his overlord he built up a small regular army, on the basis of a newly imposed levy known as the vojstatik, which was stationed in the country's 11 major fortresses as well as several of its small walled towns. This army included many Hungarians and was well equipped with cannon and handguns; for example, there were 2 cannons in the fort guarding the large silver mine at Srebrnica in 1425, and in Belgrade, Lazarević capital, there was a large bombard (called Humka, meaning 'Knoll') captured from the Bosnians the same year. In 1455 there were as many as 3 large cannon, 5 other guns and 55 handguns in the fort guarding the great silver mine at Novo Brdo.

=== Field Army ===
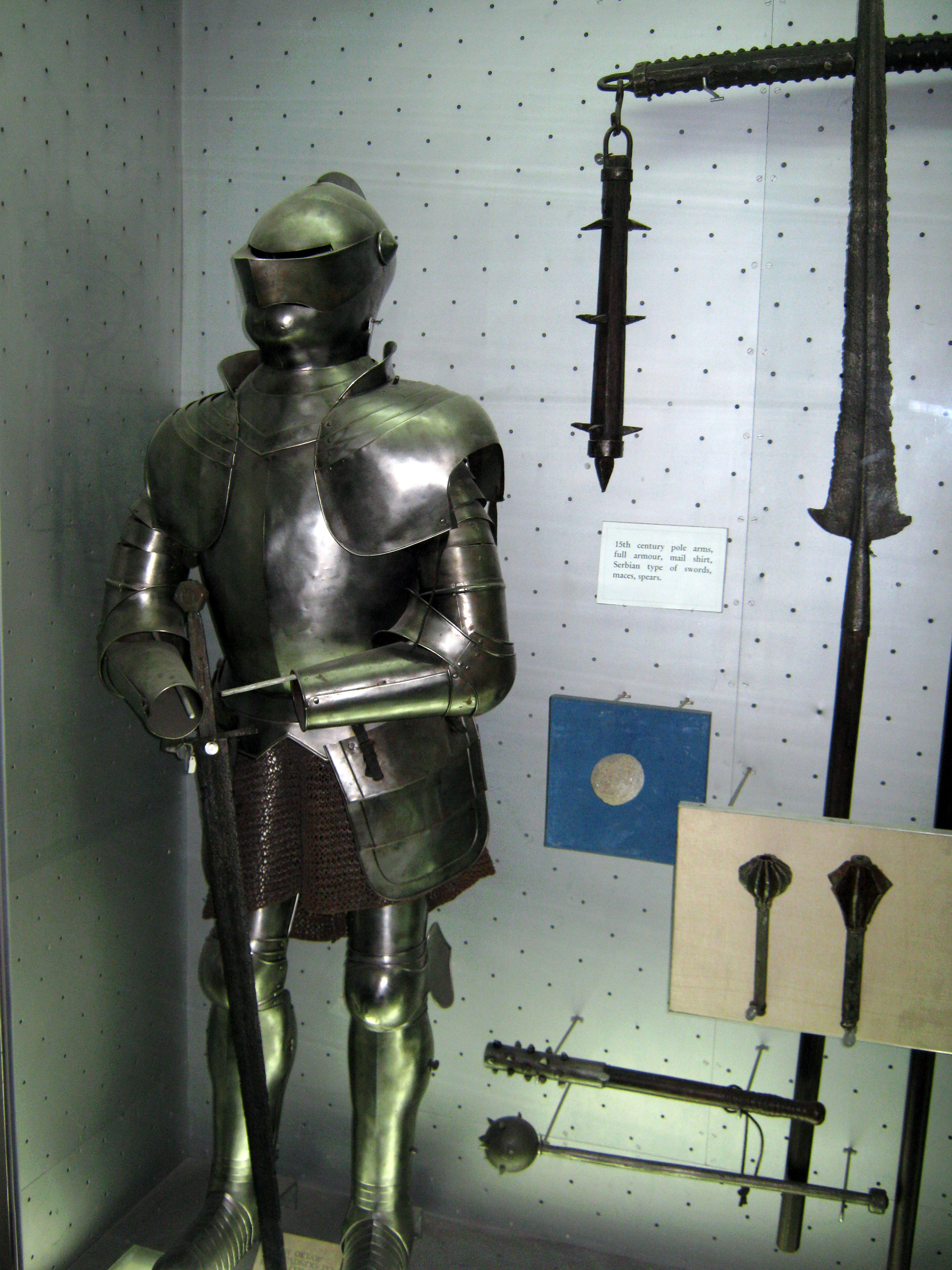
Serbian 15th-century armour (Military Museum Belgrade)

Serbian armies were composed of lance-armed light and heavy cavalry, plus infantry (armed with spears, axes, and above all bows and, later, crossbows) and a baggage-train (komora) manned by shepherds ("Vlachs"). Most of their armies tended to be small because of the difficulties involved in supplying them in the field, and on the whole they could probably raise only about 12,000 men in the late 14th century, the army at the Battle of Kosovo probably numbering at most 20-25,000 men including allied contingents. The majority were heavy cavalry. Emperor Stefan Dušan was said to have raised around 80,000 men for the invasion of Bosnia in 1350 although the largest Serbian army on record in this period was that raised by Dušan in 1355 for his proposed attack on Constantinople, which numbered 85,000 men according to later Ragusan chronicles.

After the Battle of Maritsa in 1371, Ottoman suzerainty was accepted by the Serbian rulers in Macedonia: King Marko (Vukašin Mrnjavčević's son), Konstantin Dragaš, and Radoslav Hlapen. By 1388, Djuradj Stracimirović Balšić, the lord of Zeta, also became an Ottoman vassal. Stefan Lazarević and Vuk Branković accepted Ottoman suzerainty in 1390 and 1392, respectively. Stefan Lazarević ceased to be an Ottoman vassal and ally in 1402, when he became a despot and created the Serbian Despotate. According to Serbian historiography, Stefan from 1390 on, was obliged to pay an annual tribute of 1,000 lbs of gold and to provide the sultan with a contingent of 1,000 cavalry when called upon. Finlay and Creasy, however, maintained that it was the treaty of 1376 that first imposed this obligation, while Gibbons says 1386; certainly there were Serbs as well as Bulgarians and Byzantines in the Ottoman army that fought against the Karamanli Turks in Anatolia in 1387 (the Serbs being promised booty in return for their services). Finlay says in one of his books that Sultan Beyazid actually demanded the service of the same number of Serbians as the Byzantines had called for after Manuel's subjugation of Serbia in 1150, i.e. 2,000 to armies serving in Europe and 500 to armies serving in Asia; but in another book he says that the figure was only 'subsequently increased to 2,000 men' when Beyazid was gathering his forces to confront Tamerlane in 1402. Bertrandon de la Brocquière, in his 'Travels' of 1432-33, recorded of the despot of Serbia that 'every time the sultan sends him his orders, he is obliged to furnish him with 800 or 1,000 horse, under the command of his second son.' Elsewhere he adds how he had heard that 'in the most recent army [supplied to the sultan] from Greece, there were 3,000 Serbian horse, which the despot of the province had sent under the command of one of his sons. It was with great regret that these people came to serve him, but they dared not refuse.' Konstantin Mihailović reports that when the treaty with Serbia was renewed under Mehmed II the obligatory tribute was set at 1,500 lbs of gold and a contingent of 1,500 cavalry.

Amongst the battles in which Serbs fought for their Ottoman allies were Battle of Rovine, against the Wallachians and Bulgarians, in 1395; Battle of Nicopolis in 1396, where apparently their contingent comprised 5,000 heavy cavalry; and Battle of Ankara in 1402, where Doukas says there were 5,000 "encased in black armor" and Chalkokondyles that there were an unlikely 10,000 (though the Ottoman chronicler al-Anwari says that there were 10,000 Serbs and Wallachians altogether). George Branković even supplied an unwilling contingent of 1,500 cavalry under voivode Jakša according to Konstantin Mihailović, for the final siege of Constantinople in 1453, plus some silver-miners from Novo Brdo whom Sultan Mehmed employed as sappers. On August 11, 1473, the army that marched against Uzun Hasan which resulted in an Ottoman victory in The battle of Otlukbeli included many Christians - Greeks, Albanians and Serbians, in their number.

==== Cavalry ====
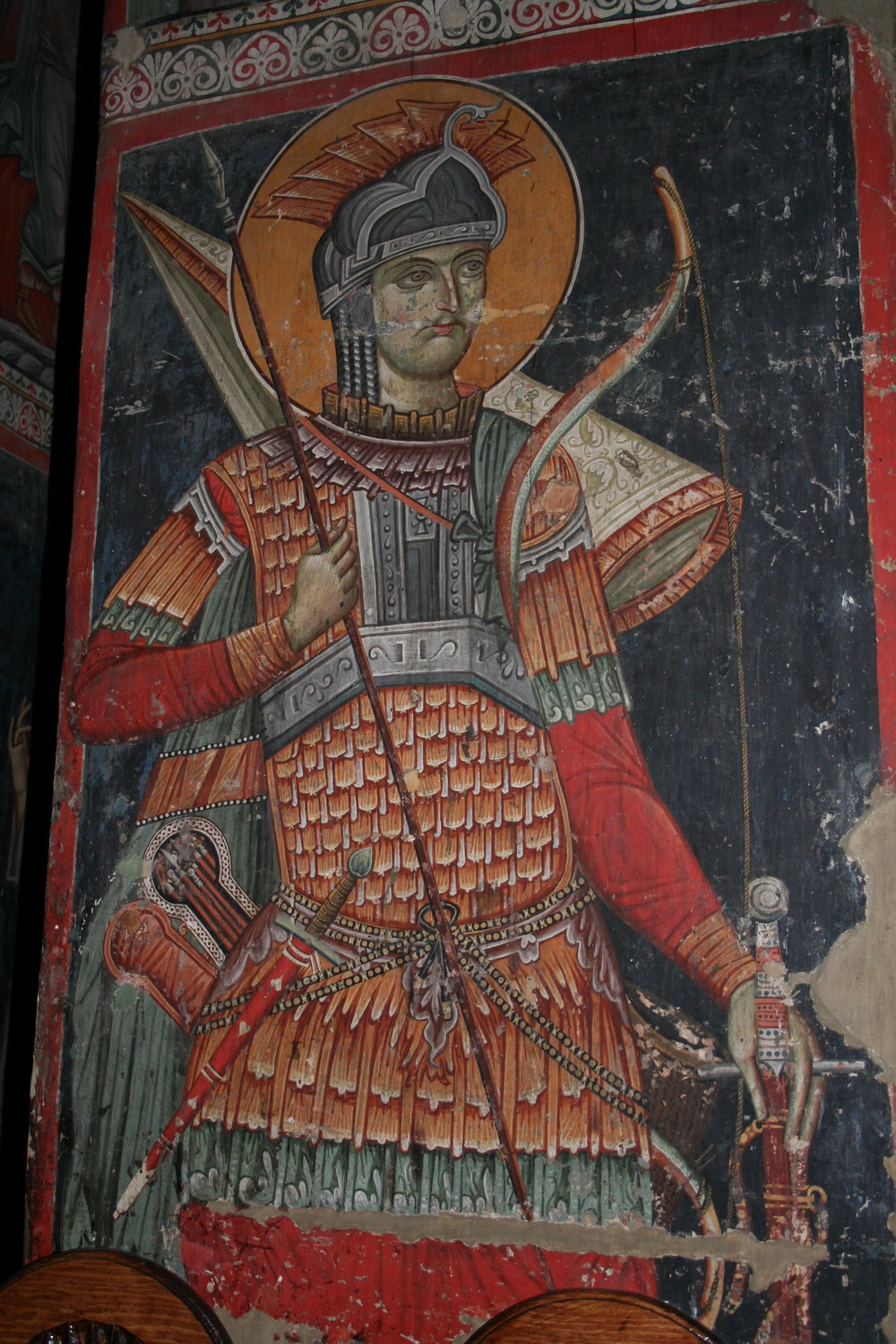
Serbian military uniform influenced by Byzantium tradition, depicted in fresco in Lesnovo Monastery

Gusar light cavalry forces were part of the medieval Serbian military. Armed with spears and pentagonal wood shields padded with metal, they supported the noble knights as their second line on the battlefield. In the middle of each wooden shield, there was a round metal knob that held the shield together.

Gusar light cavalries were a traditional Serbian force, which meant that they usually were not hired as mercenaries from Spain or Germany. Their style of fighting was similar to the noble knights. They used the eastern style of fighting: they would charge into the enemy ferociously, and try to cause mass havoc. As for their role with the foot soldiers, they were more like support cavalry. When the foot soldiers were losing the battle, the Gusars would charge into the enemy's flank, hoping to cause them to rout. They would repeat this charge from different angles while the infantry kept the enemy from chasing the Gusars.

Later on, after the fall of the Serbian Empire, these troops were used as "Krajišnici" meaning frontiersman in the Habsburg Monarchy (today Croatia, Slavonia, Vojvodina) which southern parts became the military frontier, defending and liberating as they believed Christendom from the Ottoman invasion. Their military tactics of engaging combat, as well as pillaging and looting of Ottoman ruled territories, were similar to the ones of the Cossacks.

According to Webster's the word hussar stems from the Hungarian huszár, which in turn originates from the Serbian хусар (Husar, or гусар, Gusar) meaning pirate, from the Medieval Latin cursarius (cf. the English word corsair). A variant of this theory is offered by Byzantinist scholars, who argue the term originated in Roman military practice, and the cursarii (singular cursarius). Through Byzantine Army operations in the Balkans in the 10th and 11th centuries when Chosarioi/Chonsarioi were recruited with especially Serbs, the word was subsequently reintroduced to Western European military practice after its original usage had been lost with the collapse of Rome in the west.

The hussars reportedly originated in bands of mostly Serbian warriors crossing into Kingdom of Hungary after the Ottoman invasion of medieval Serbian state at the end of the 14th century. The Governor of Hungary, Hunyadi János – John Hunyadi, created mounted units inspired by his enemy the Ottoman Turks. His son, Hunyadi Mátyás Matthias Corvinus, later king of Hungary, is unanimously accepted as the creator of these troops. Initially they fought in small bands, but were reorganised into larger, trained, formations during the reign of King Matthias Corvinus. Initially the first units of Polish hussars in the Kingdom of Poland were formed in 1500, which consisted of Serbian mercenaries.

=== Navy ===
In addition to her land forces, Serbia occasionally also had a very small fleet, provided by the communes of Dulcigno (modern Ulcinj), Budua (Budva) and Cattaro (Kotor), sometimes by Ragusa (in exchange for a year's tax-exemption), and briefly by Venice (which provided 4 new galleys, the galee domini imperatoris, in 1350, the subsequent fate of which is unknown). King Tvrtko of Bosnia too later constructed his own small fleet, with a Venetian as its admiral, and was similarly given a galley by Venice, this time fitted with a cannon.

== Equipment ==
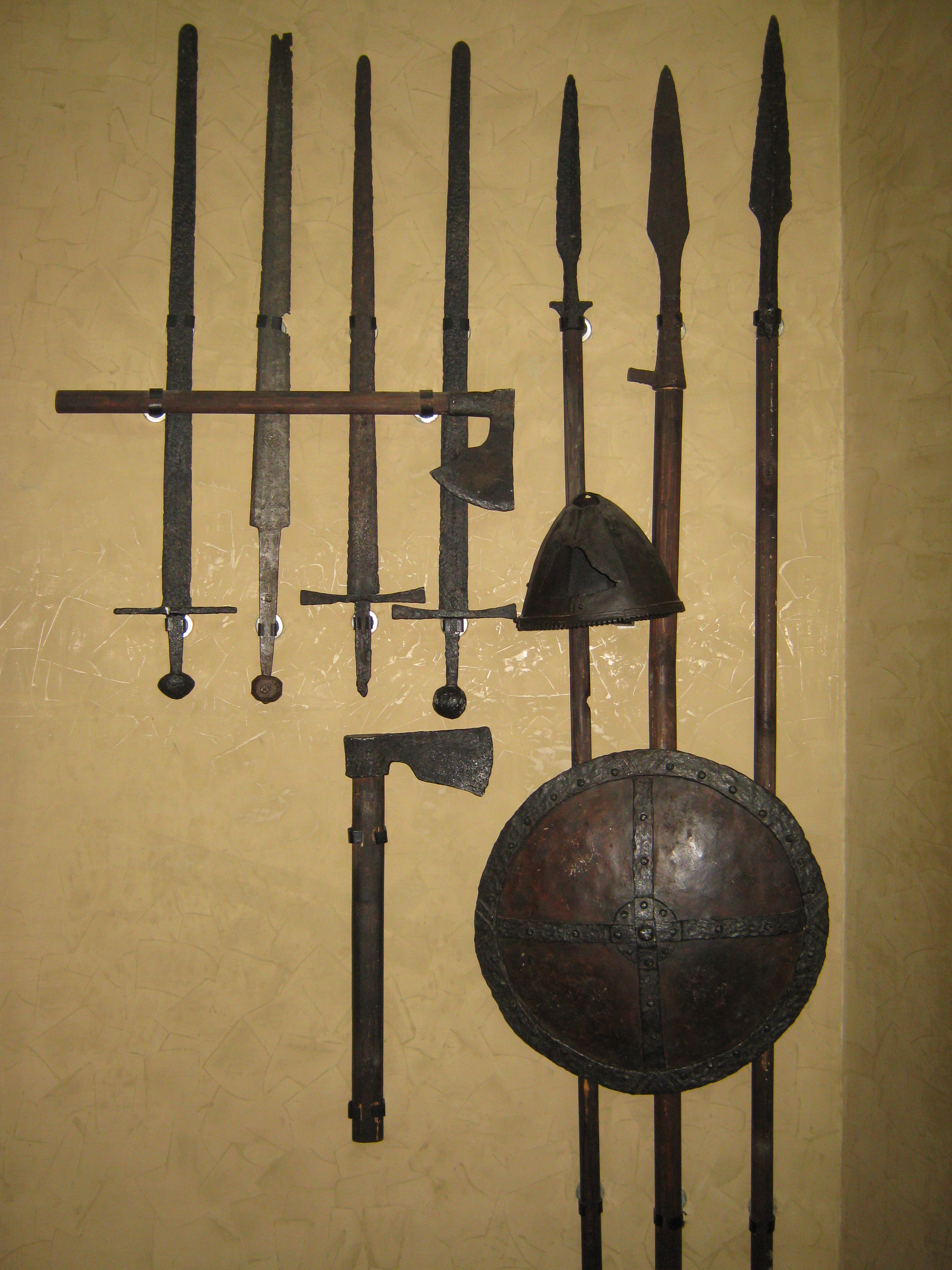
Serbian medieval field army equipment (Military Museum Belgrade)

=== Weapons and armour ===
Prior to the 14th century the army consisted of classic European-style noble cavalry armed with bows and lances (replaced with crossbows in the 14th century) and infantry armed with spears, javelins and bows.

=== Artillery ===
Serbia had adopted gunpowder artillery from the Republic of Ragusa, where a centre for the manufacture of wrought-iron cannon existed by 1363. The first gun foundry in the Balkans, casting bronze cannons, was also established at Ragusa (Dubrovnik), in 1410. Neighbouring Bosnia had cannon by 1380, and they were in use in Serbia by 1382–86 at the very latest, probably served and certainly made by Ragusan engineers. In fact, Ragusan chronicler Mavro Orbini (1563–1614) claims that knez Lazar Hrebeljanović used guns against župan Nikola Altomanović even as early as 1373. Guns were apparently employed in the field by the Serbians as early as 1389 at the Battle of Kosovo, being clearly mentioned in one later Ottoman chronicle (Mehmed Neşrî) and alluded to in a contemporary Serbian source which says that 'fiery explosions thundered, the earth roared greatly, and the air echoed and blew around like dark smoke'; we know too that King Tvrtko of Bosnia (1353–91) brought one gun, a gift of the Italians, with him to the battle. The Serbian contingent in the Ottoman army defeated at Ankara in 1402 also had artillery, but as at Kosovo it failed to affect the outcome, probably for the same reasons on both occasions - i.e. the guns were too small to be effective in order that they might be maneuverable on the battlefield. In siege work trebuchets and ballistae remained in service alongside gunpowder artillery for a long time.

== See also ==
- List of wars involving Serbia in the Middle Ages
- Military history of Serbia

== Sources ==
- Humphreys, Brendan (2013). The Battle Backwards A Comparative Study of the Battle of Kosovo Polje (1389) and the Munich Agreement (1938) as Political Myths (PDF) (Thesis).
- Aleksić, Marko (2007). Mediaeval Swords from Southeastern Europe. Material from 12th to 15th Century. Belgrade: Dedraplast.
- Bataković, Dušan T., ed. (2005). Histoire du peuple serbe [History of the Serbian People] (in French). Lausanne: L’Age d’Homme. ISBN 9782825119587.
- Bulić, Dejan (2013). "The Fortifications of the Late Antiquity and the Early Byzantine Period on the Later Territory of the South-Slavic Principalities, and their re-occupation". The World of the Slavs: Studies of the East, West and South Slavs: Civitas, Oppidas, Villas and Archeological Evidence (7th to 11th Centuries AD). Istorijski institut SANU. pp. 137–234. ISBN 9788677431044.
- Ćirković, Sima (2004). The Serbs. Malden: Blackwell Publishing. ISBN 9781405142915.
- Ćirković, Sima; Mihaljčić, Rade (1999). Лексикон српског средњег века (in Serbian). Knowledge. ISBN 9788683233014.
- Drašković, Marko (2010). "Српско наоружање и тактика у делу Јована Кинама" [Serbian Armament and Tactics in Writings of John Kinnamos]. Војно-историјски гласник (II): 9–19.
- Fine, John Van Antwerp Jr. (1991) [1983]. The Early Medieval Balkans: A Critical Survey from the Sixth to the Late Twelfth Century. Ann Arbor, Michigan: University of Michigan Press. ISBN 0472081497.
- Fine, John Van Antwerp Jr. (1994) [1987]. The Late Medieval Balkans: A Critical Survey from the Late Twelfth Century to the Ottoman Conquest. Ann Arbor, Michigan: University of Michigan Press. ISBN 0472082604.
- Ivanović, Miloš (2014). "Развитак војне службе као основ формирања властеоског слоја у српској средњовековној држави" [Development of Military Service as Foundation for Creation of Nobility in Medieval Serbian State]. Војно-историјски гласник (I): 30–48.
- Ivanović, Miloš (2019). "Militarization of the Serbian State under Ottoman Pressure". Hungarian Historical Review. 8 (2): 390–410.
- Mihaljčić, Rade (2001) [1984]. Лазар Хребељановић: историја, култ, предање (in Serbian). Belgrade: Srpska školska knjiga; Knowledge. ISBN 86-83565-01-7.
- Škrivanić, Gavro (1957). Оружје у средњовековној Србији, Босни и Дубровнику. Научно дело.
- Uzelac, Aleksandar (2014). "Српске војске у ратовима у Европи и Малој Азији (XII-XIV век)" [Serbian Armies in the Wars in Europe and Asia Minor (XII-XIV C.)]. Војно-историјски гласник (I): 9–29.
- Uzelac, Aleksandar B. (2015). "Foreign Soldiers in the Nemanjić State - A Critical Overview". Belgrade Historical Review. 6: 69–89.
- Cox, John K. (2002). The History of Serbia. Greenwood Publishing Group. ISBN 978-0-313-31290-8.
