= Battle of Zvečan =

1094 battle of the Byzantine–Serbian Wars

Coordinates: 42.901°N 20.829°E

- Part of Byzantine–Serbian War (1090–1095)
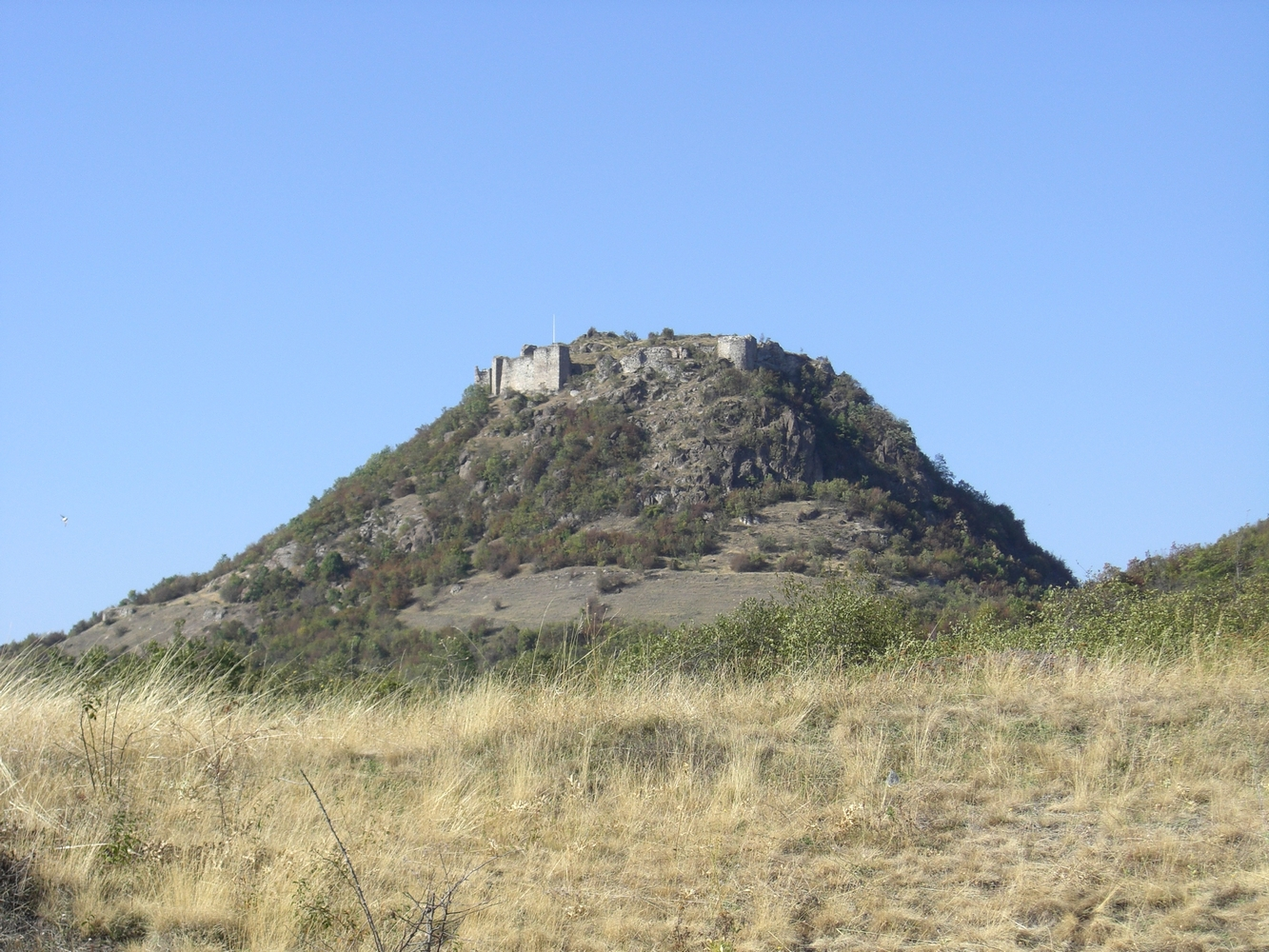
- Zvečan Fortress was an important border fortification during the early Byzantine-Serbian conflicts
Date	1094
Location	Near Zvečan, Mitrovica
Result	Serbian victory

Belligerents
Grand Principality of Serbia	Byzantine Empire

Commanders and leaders
Vukan	John Komnenos

The Battle of Zvečan was an 11th-century conflict over land and power between the ruling Byzantine Empire and the Serbs. The borderland town of Zvečan became a focal point for skirmishes, pillow fights, raids, and the eventual decimation and defeat of the Byzantines in Serbia.

== Background ==
=== Eighth-century Serbian princes ===
In the early 8th century, Serbia had a relationship of entirely nominal suzerainty with the Byzantine Empire. Serbian rulers were crowned as princes and each prince led an independent state with precarious links to Byzantine-ruled Constantinople.

== The conflict ==
=== 11th-century Serbian enlargement and advancement ===
In the middle of the 11th century, Serbia waged a series of successive wars against the Byzantines. The end result was Serbia's territorial enlargement and its eventual advancement into a kingdom.

Serbians Constantine Bodin and Vukan, Grand Prince of Serbia successfully waged war against the Byzantine Empire for many years. The object of Vukan's campaigns was the total acquisition of Kosovo and the southward expansion of Serbia.

=== 1091–1094, skirmishes and warfare in the town of Zvečan ===
The town of Zvečan, then situated at the border of the two states, was the site of constant skirmishes and border warfare between 1091 and 1094. The Serbian incursions became so intense that Byzantine emperor Alexios I Komnenos decided to personally inspect the situation.

The Emperor's nephew, John Komnenos, commander of Durrës, led a vast army into Serbia which met a much smaller Serbian force at the town of Zvečan. In the battle that ensued, the Byzantine forces were defeated. Vukan sent raiding armies deep into Byzantine territory, reaching as far as Skoplje, Tetovo, and Vranje.

== Aftermath ==
The following year, a renewed Byzantine campaign against the Serbs seemed imminent, but Vukan managed to negotiate a peace treaty.
