= Byzantine–Serbian War (1090–1095) =

- Part of the Byzantine–Serbian wars
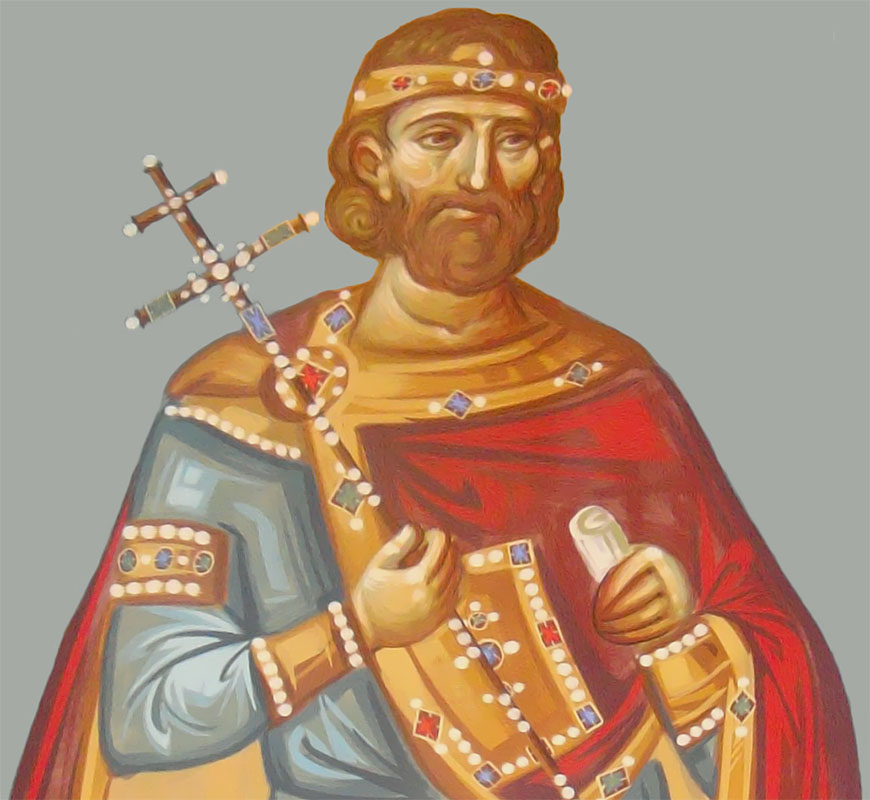
- Vukan I, ruler of the Principality of Serbia during Byzantine–Serbian War (1090–1095)
Date	1090–1095
Location	Raška, Macedonia
Result	Serbian military victory; Consecutive attacks and plunder of the Byzantine territory and defeats of their armies; Peace treaty; Several Serbian nobles taken hostage; Cessation of hostilities between Serbia and Byzantium until 1106, when Vukan defeated the army of John Komnenos and reached a truce again with Alexios I Komnenos
Territorial changes	Southern Kosovo temporarily gained by Serbia

Belligerents
Grand Principality of Serbia	Byzantine Empire: Theme of Dyrrhachion

Commanders and leaders
Vukan Vojislavljević	Alexios I Komnenos; John Komnenos

The Byzantine–Serbian War (c. 1090–1096) was part of a series of wars between the Byzantine Empire and the medieval Serbian states. The succession of medieval Serbian states went through several periods of warfare.

In around 1090, Vukan, governor of Raška, declared independence from the mediaval kingdom of Duklja and established the Grand Principality of Serbia. Soon, he launched a series of raids into Byzantine Empire's territories, under Emperor Alexios I Komnenos, around Kosovo to expand his territory and influence. The raids were successful due to Turkish incursions distracting the Byzantines.

After destroying village of Lipljan, he negotiated peace, only to resume attacks once Byzantium faced other threats in 1093, capturing cities such as Vranje, Skopje, and Tetovo. The raids were successful because Alexios I was distracted with another Turkish incursion. Though Alexios I forced another truce, hostilities flared again in 1106 when Vukan defeated Byzantine forces once more. These conflicts established a pattern of warfare, diplomacy, and hostage exchanges that defined early Serbian-Byzantine relations.

== Prelude ==
The Serbian medieval state of Duklja gained independence from the Byzantine Empire in the early 11th century under Stefan Vojislav, who founded the eponymous Vojislavljević dynasty. Vojislav's son Mihailo succeeded him in the 1040s. Mihailo expanded his rule towards inner Serbian regions, became a king and ruled until 1081. He was succeeded by his own son, king Constantine Bodin, whose rule was marked by complex relations with the Byzantine empire.

In 1083, king Bodin appointed Vukan as governor of the Raška (i.e., Serbia). He enlarged his domain, proclaimed his independence from the king c. 1090, took the title of Grand Župan (Prince) and thus founded the Grand Principality of Serbia. Around that same time he began penetrating into Byzantine territory and raiding areas in and around Kosovo region, taking advantage of a Turkish incursion into Byzantine territory near Constantinople which preoccupied the Emperor Alexios I.

== Events ==
Most of the fighting between the Serbs and Byzantines occurred in the Kosovo region, particularly between the Serbian-held fortress of Zvečan and the Byzantine stronghold of Lypenion, as well as along the Toplica north of Vranje. While little is recorded about Vukan's early campaigns, historians describe them as harsh. Around 1090, Grand Prince Vukan began raiding Byzantine lands near Kosovo. The Byzantines, preoccupied with an invasion by the Pechenegs, could not respond effectively. When Emperor Alexios I Komnenos finally turned his attention westward in 1092, he sent an army under the governor of Durazzo, which suffered a defeat.

In 1093, Vukan destroyed the village of Lipljan, then an important eparchy under the Archbishopric of Ohrid. That attack provoked Emperor Alexios I to personally lead an army toward the Serbian border, likely in 1094. Facing retaliation and potential loss, Vukan sent a letter to Skopje, claiming that Byzantine agents had caused the conflict and expressing willingness to make peace. Alexios accepted his offer, as his focus was diverted by a renewed threat from the Cumans, who had crossed the Danube and were ravaging Thrace and Bulgaria. Taking advantage of the emperor's distraction, Vukan quickly resumed his raids, capturing several key cities, including Vranje, Skopje, and Tetovo. In response, Alexios dispatched his nephew John Komnenos, governor of Dyrrhachion, who was defeated by Vukan at Zvečan. The emperor then marched into Serbia himself, forcing Vukan to seek peace once more. Alexios I accepted lenient terms and returned to Constantinople with twenty hostages, among them Vukan's two sons, to ensure the agreement was upheld.

== Aftermath ==
The second treaty would conclude hostilities between Serbia and the Byzantine Empire for 11 years. Following this treaty it also became commonplace for there to be Serbian royal family members that were 'court hostages' in Constantinople to ensure peaceable relations between the Serbs and Byzantines.

In 1106, hostilities would resume between the Grand Principality of Serbia and the Byzantine Empire when Vukan attacked Byzantium one last time, defeating the army of John Komnenos (governor of Dyrrhachium) once again.

== Sources ==
- Bataković, Dušan T., ed. (2005). Histoire du peuple serbe [History of the Serbian People] (in French). Lausanne: L’Age d’Homme.
- Ćirković, Sima (2004). The Serbs. Malden: Blackwell Publishing.
- Fine, John Van Antwerp Jr. (1991) [1983]. The Early Medieval Balkans: A Critical Survey from the Sixth to the Late Twelfth Century. Ann Arbor, Michigan: University of Michigan Press.
- Srejović, Dragoslav; Mirković, Sima; Gavrilović, Slavko (1981). Istorija srpskog naroda: knj. Od najstarijih vremena do Maričke bitke (1371) (in Serbian).
