= Vojinović noble family =

Medieval Serbian noble family

Vojinović Војиновић
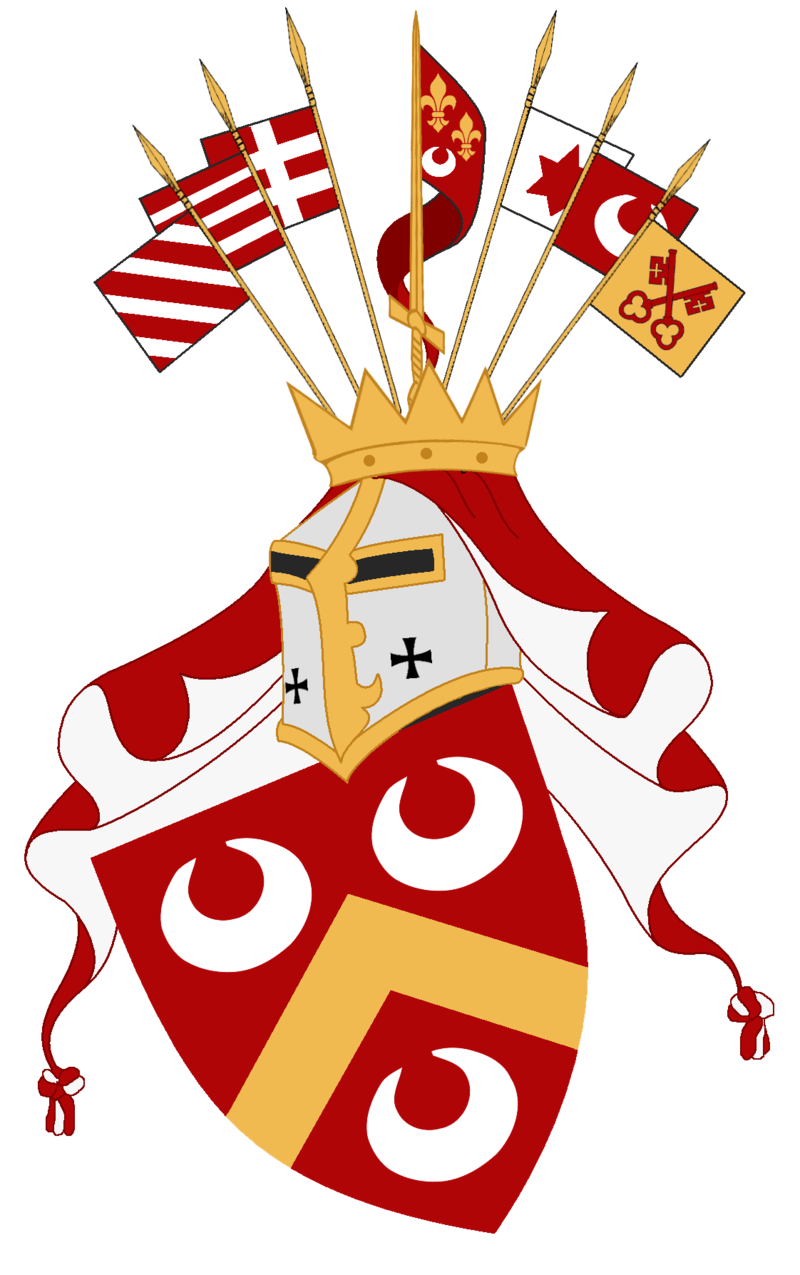
- Country: Medieval Serbia: Serbian Empire; Serbian Despotate
- Founded: 1322, by Vojvoda Vojin
- Final ruler: Nikola Altomanović
- Titles: voivode (military commander, Duke), Grand Voivode, Grand Župan, caesar
- Estates: Hum (1322-1363); Area encompassing: Rudnik, Podrinje, Polimlje, East Hum, Konavle and Dračevica (1368)
- Dissolution: 1398

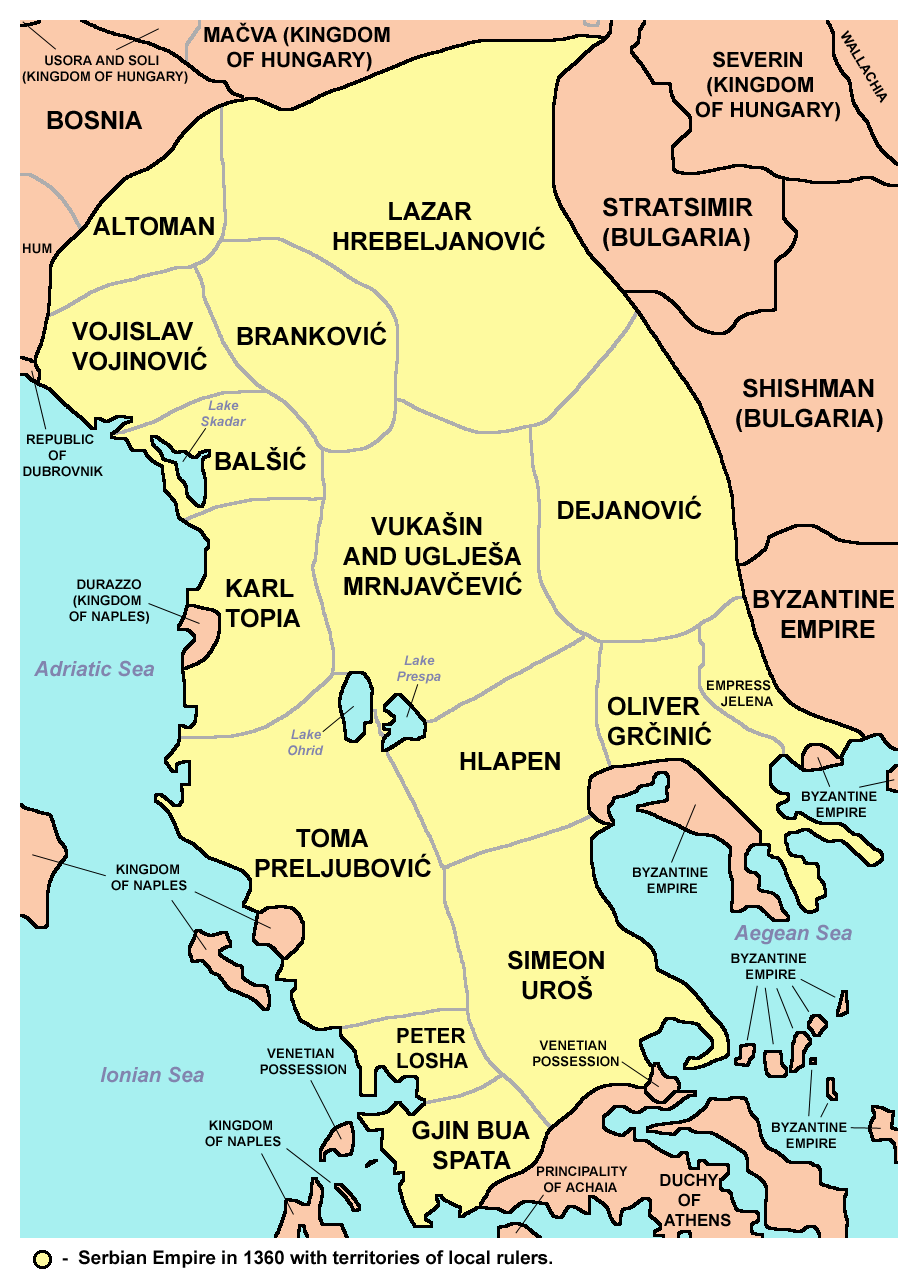
Map of the Serbian Empire in 1360 with territories of local rulers

The Vojinović family (Serbian Cyrillic: Војиновић, pl. Vojinovići / Војиновићи) is a medieval Serbian noble family that played an important role in the Serbian Empire during the 14th century. Following the death of Emperor Dušan (King 1331–1346, emperor 1346–1355), in the period of the Fall of the Serbian Empire, its representatives, Grand Duke Vojislav Vojinović (c. 1355–1363) and later his cousin Nikola Altomanović Vojinović (1366–1373), were among the strongest regional lords in medieval Serbia.

== History ==
The family's ancestor, whose name is unknown, had four sons, two of whom are known: Hrvatin and Vojin. Vojvoda Vojin is considered the founder of the noble lineage; during the reign of Stefan Dečanski, he controlled areas around Gacko. Their holdings expanded over the years, and his heirs, Vojislav and Nikola, controlled a territory stretching from the borders of the Republic of Ragusa, the Bay of Kotor, and Zvečan Fortress to Rudnik. The power of the last representative of the Vojinović family was broken by a joint coalition consisting of Prince Lazar (1371–1389) and Ban Tvrtko (Ban 1353–1377, King 1377–1391). This coalition was supported by King of Hungary Louis I (1342–1382), who sent the Ban of Mačva Nikola Gorjanski Elder with 1000 lancers during the summer and autumn of 1373. The lands of the Vojinović family were divided. Nikola was captured and blinded in Užice Fortress. He subsequently received a small estate where he died after 1398, the last year he is mentioned in historical sources. During the 14th century, the Vojinović family was connected with other Serbian noble families, such as the Branivojevići and the Mladenovići.

== Legacy ==
The influence of the Vojinović family is reflected in Serbian folk tradition. They appear in epic folk poetry, specifically in the Pre-Kosovan Cycle (Miloš Vojinović), and are credited with building medieval structures in Vučitrn, such as the Old Bridge (Vojinovića most) and fort (Vojinovića Kula).

According to folklore, the family originated from Vučitrn in Kosovo, where the Vojinović Bridge and Vojinović Tower are located.

== Vojinović family members ==
1. Unknown
  1. Unknown
  2. Unknown
  3. Hrvatin (late 13th century–March 6, 1349), veliki čelnik, controlled the area around Rudine and beyond. In 1325, he plundered Dubrovnik with his brother Vojin. He had his own group of retainers, one of whom stole a horse in 1330. He is identified with Dimitrije buried at the Church of St. Nicholas in Banja.
  4. Vojin (1322–1347), Vojvoda for Stefan Dečanski and Emperor Dušan.
    1. Miloš Vojinović, in service to Emperor Dušan, participated in the sale of Ston and Pelješac to the Dubrovnik. He died after December 1332.
    2. Altoman Vojinović (1347–1359), married to Ratoslava Mladenović (sister of the subsequent Sebastokrator Branko Mladenović, father of Vuk Branković (1371–1391)).
      1. Nikola Altomanović Vojinović (born 1348, died after 1398, ruled 1366–1373), Grand Župan. After his father's death in 1359, he was displaced by his uncle Vojislav. Following Vojislav's death in 1363, he regained his lands.
    3. Vojislav Vojinović (c. 1355–1363), grand duke, married to Goislava.
      1. Dobrivoj, after his father's death in 1363, while still a child, was displaced by his cousin Nikola.
      2. Stefan, after his father's death in 1363, while still a child, was displaced by his cousin Nikola.
    4. Vojislava Vojinović, married to Brajko Branivojević. After his death in 1326, the young King Dušan intervened to secure her release from prison in Dubrovnik.

== See also ==
- List of Serbian monarchs
- Vojnović noble family

== Sources ==
- Fajfrić, Željko (2000a) [1998], Sveta loza Stefana Nemanje (in Serbian) (Internet ed.), Belgrade: "Tehnologije, izdavastvo, agencija Janus", "Rastko".
- Fajfrić, Željko (2000b), Veliki župan Nikola Altomanović (in Serbian) (Internet ed.), Belgrade: "Grafosrem", "Rastko".
- Tomović, Gordana (2011). Rudić, Srđan (ed.). "Vojinovići". Споменица академика Симе Ћирковића [Homage to Academician Sima Ćirković]. Istorijski institut: 355–366. ISBN 978-86-7743-091-7.
