= Vushtrri Castle =

Castle in Vushtrri, Kosovo

Coordinates: 42°49′20″N 20°58′3″E

Vushtrri Tower
- Kulla e Vjetër; Војиновића кула
- Vushtrri, Kosovo
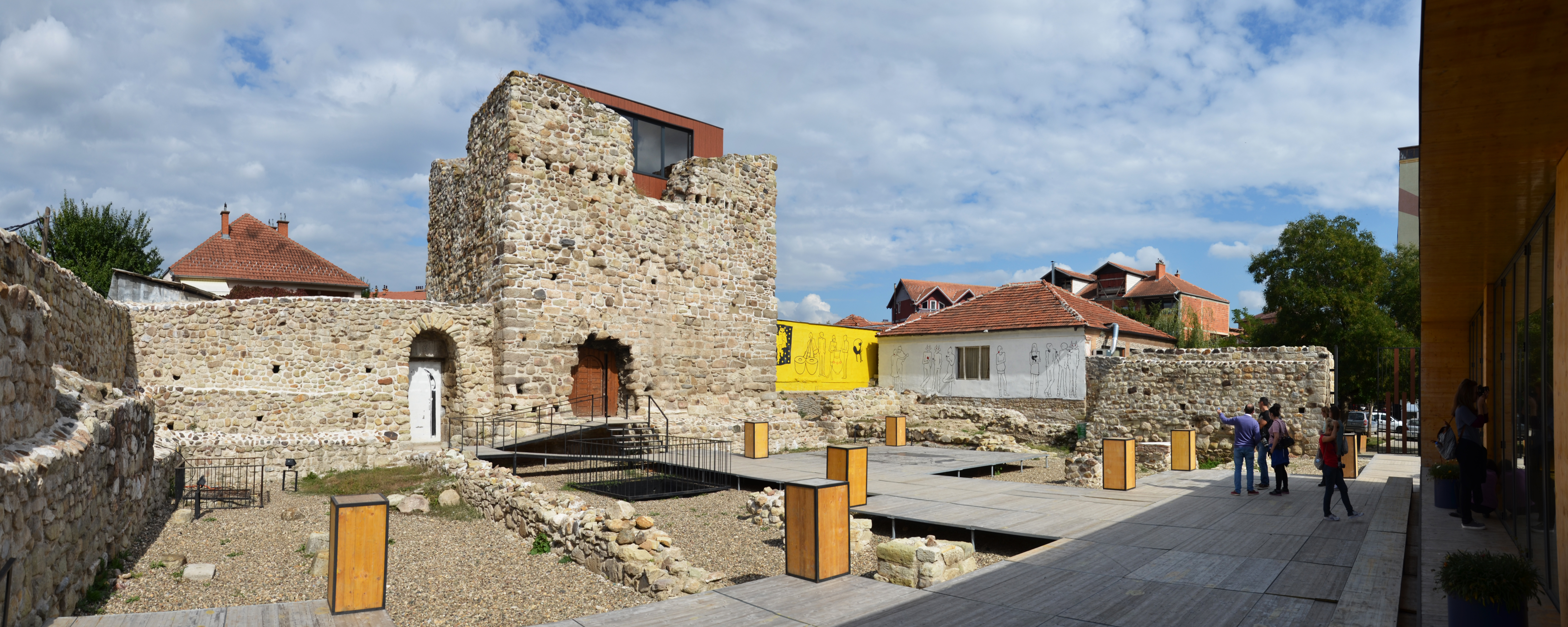
- Vojinović tower, interior court

Site information
- Type: Strategic fortification
- Open to the public: Yes

Site history
- Built by: Vojinović brothers
- Materials: Stone

Cultural Heritage under Permanent Protection
- Official name: Kështjella "Kalaja" Kulla e vjetër
- Type: Archaeological Heritage: Reservation
- Reference no.: 2852

The Vushtrri Castle (Albanian: Kalaja e Vushtrrisë; Serbian: Војиновића Кула) or Old Tower (Albanian: Kulla e Vjetër; Serbian: Vojinovića Kula) are city fortifications in Vushtrri, Kosovo. It was the seat of despot Đurađ Branković (1427–1456). Later chroniclers (Ami Boué, Aleksandar Giljferding) are noted that the fort itself is derived from the times of Dušan, and that it is an old fortress with a tower in the middle of the town.

== History ==
The building of the fortress is traditionally attributed to the Vojinović brothers, to whom is also attributed the nearby Stone Bridge, while its style places it at the end of the 14th or early 15th century. The Vojinovići existed as nobility in the first half of 14th century, and according to epic poetry were nephews of Emperor Dušan. However Vučitrn itself was outside their area of control, which was expanding to the nearby Zvečan, even at the time of their greatest power under the Vojislav Vojinović (around 1355 - 1363) and Nikola Altomanović (1366–1373). However, in Vučitrn in the early 15th century, the court of the house of Branković is mentioned, who were related to the Vojinović family: Ratoslava, the sister of Branko Mladenović (father of Vuk Branković) was married to Altoman Vojinović (father of Nikola Altomanović).

== Vojinović Tower ==
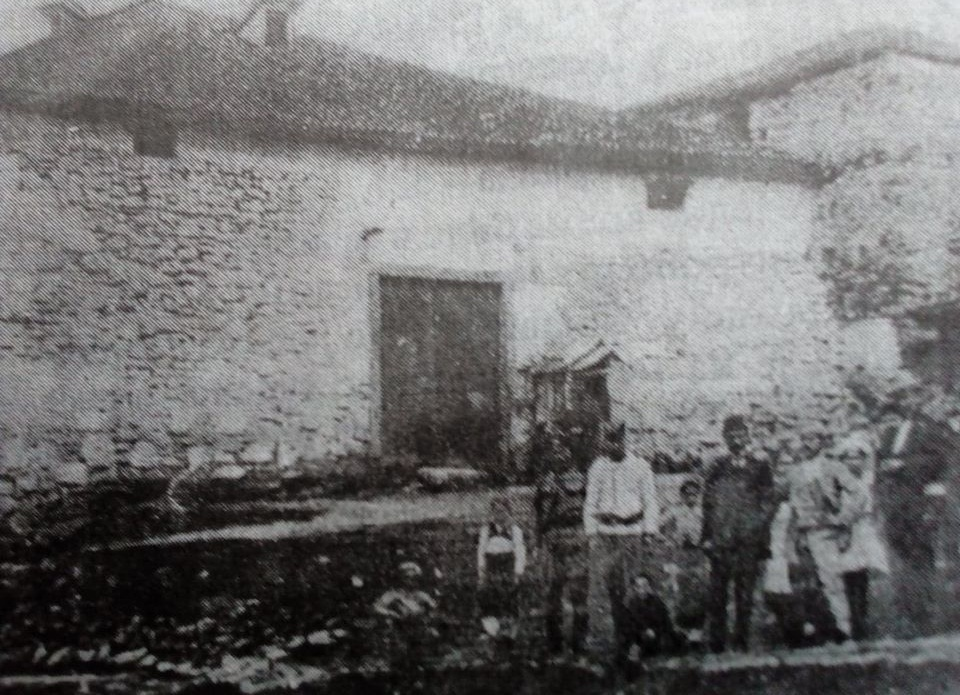
Vojinović Tower

Today, of the entire fort survived only donjon tower that the people called Vojinović Tower with part of wall in the form of a square. On that walls (thick about 3 m), the remains of machicolation, putlog holes or hoardings can be seen, and in addition to the closed ground, had the floor, over which there was an open top of the tower with battlement on. As all Donjon, Vojinović Tower also had no entrance in the basement, but only on the floor with the southern side and it is approached by wooden stairs that in a case of emergency could be easily removed.

== Remains ==
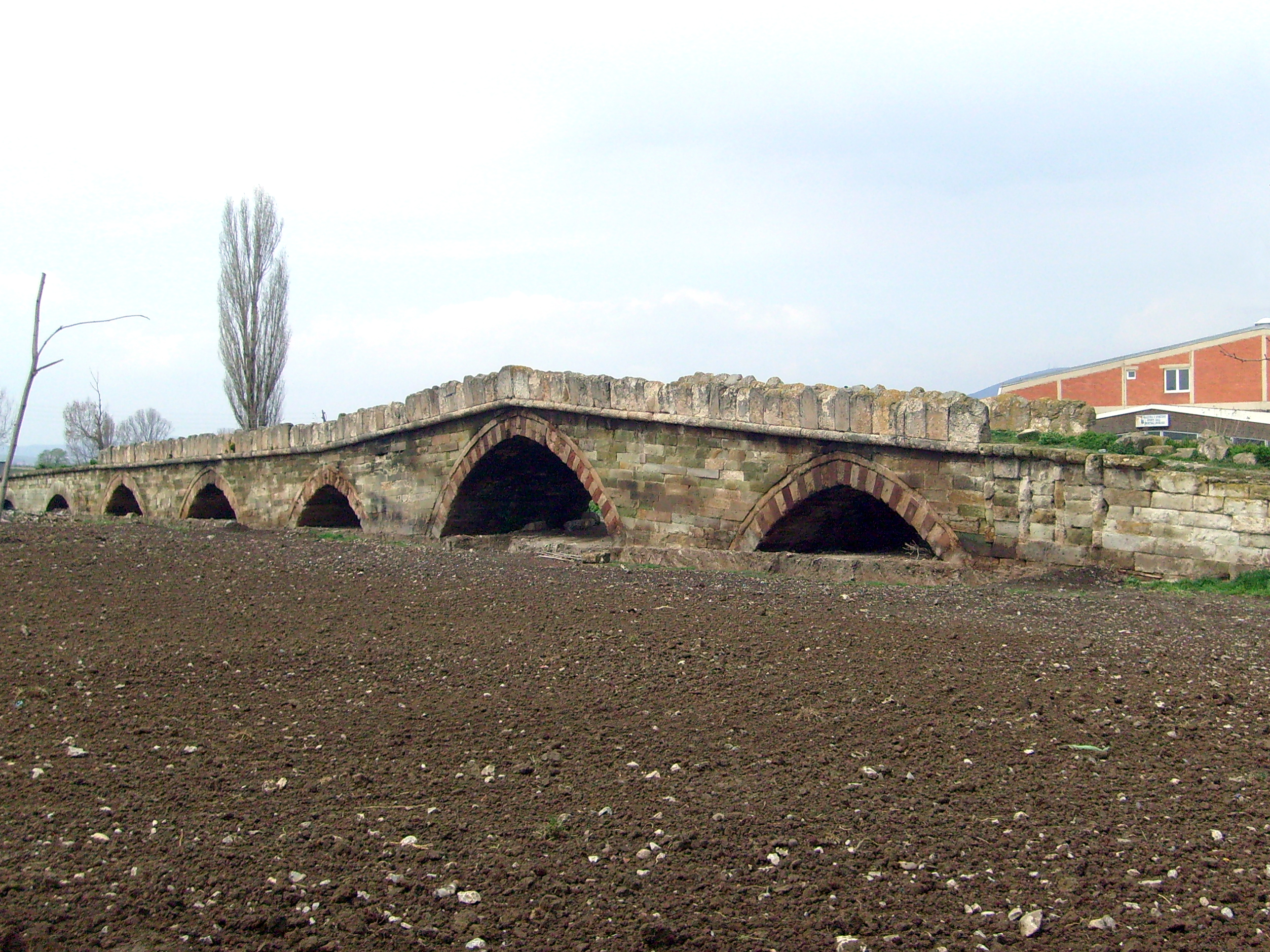
Stone Bridge

Most of the former capital of Đurađ Branković disappeared during Ottoman period when the space fortress became the seat of government and administrative Bey, while the ground floor of the tower used as a warehouse for the grain (barley, corn, wheat) that are collected on behalf of Bey taxes. Former entrance gates, located next to the tower (at a distance of 1m) in North wall and has semicircle shape, was embowered and immured, and instead of that one, new was opened on the East wall.

Today, of the whole former fortress survived only donjon tower with walls around it to form a square courtyard base. Their height is 4–5 m, with the exception of southern wall that faces the main street with the bottom of the slope (height 1.2–1.5 m, sally 0.35–0.4 m) whose height is 6–7 m.

Vojinović Tower was declared Monument of Culture of Exceptional Importance in 1990, and it was protected by the Republic of Serbia.

== See also ==
- Cultural heritage of Kosovo
