= Stone Bridge, Vushtrri =

Cultural heritage monument of Kosovo

Coordinates: 42.8236°N 20.9603°E

Stone Bridge
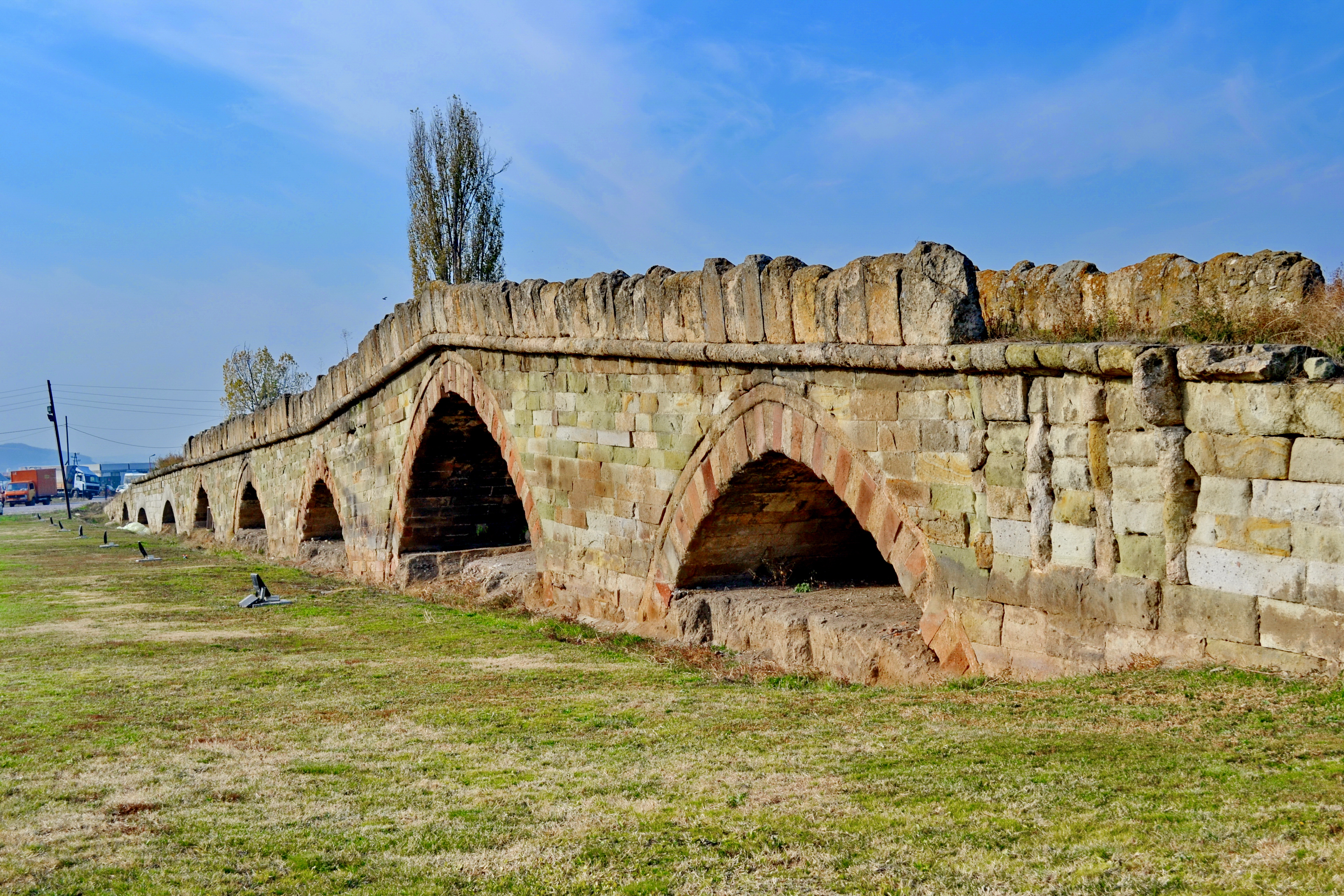
- Interactive map of Stone Bridge
- Location: Vushtrri, Kosovo
- Designer: Vojinović brothers
- Type: Bridge
- Material: Stone
- Length: 135 metres (443 ft)
- Width: 5 metres (16 ft)
- Beginning date: 14th century
- Completion date: 15th century

The Stone Bridge (Albanian: Ura e Vjetër e Gurit - Ura me Nëntë Harqe) or Vojinović Bridge (Serbian: Vojinovića most, Serbian Cyrillic: Војиновића мост) is a medieval bridge located in Vushtrri (Serbian: Vučitrn), Kosovo. It dates from the end of the 14th or early 15th century, and according to legend, was built by two brothers from the Vojinović noble family. The brothers are mentioned in Serbian epic poetry as nephews of Tsar Dušan, who ruled as King of Serbia from 1331–1346 and as Serbian Emperor from 1346–1355. It was built over the Sitnica river, which lay on the trade route between Dubrovnik and Skopje and neighbouring parts of the Balkan peninsula.

Despite the need, no conservation works have been undertaken on the bridge. In 1990, it was declared as a Monument of Culture of Exceptional Importance by the Republic of Serbia.

== History ==
The construction of the bridge is traditionally attributed to the Vojinović brothers, to whom is also attributed the nearby Vushtrri Castle. Its style suggests it was built in the late 14th or early 15th century. The Vojinovići existed as nobility in the first half of 14th century, and according to epic poetry were nephews of Emperor Dušan. However, Vushtrri itself was outside their area of control, which was expanding to the nearby Zvečan, even at the time of their greatest power under the Vojislav Vojinović (around 1355–1363) and Nikola Altomanović (1366–1373). However, in Vushtrri in the early 15th century, the court of the House of Branković is mentioned, who were related to the Vojinović family. Ratoslava, the sister of Branko Mladenović (father of Vuk Branković), was married to Altoman Vojinović (the father of Nikola Altomanović).

== Architecture ==
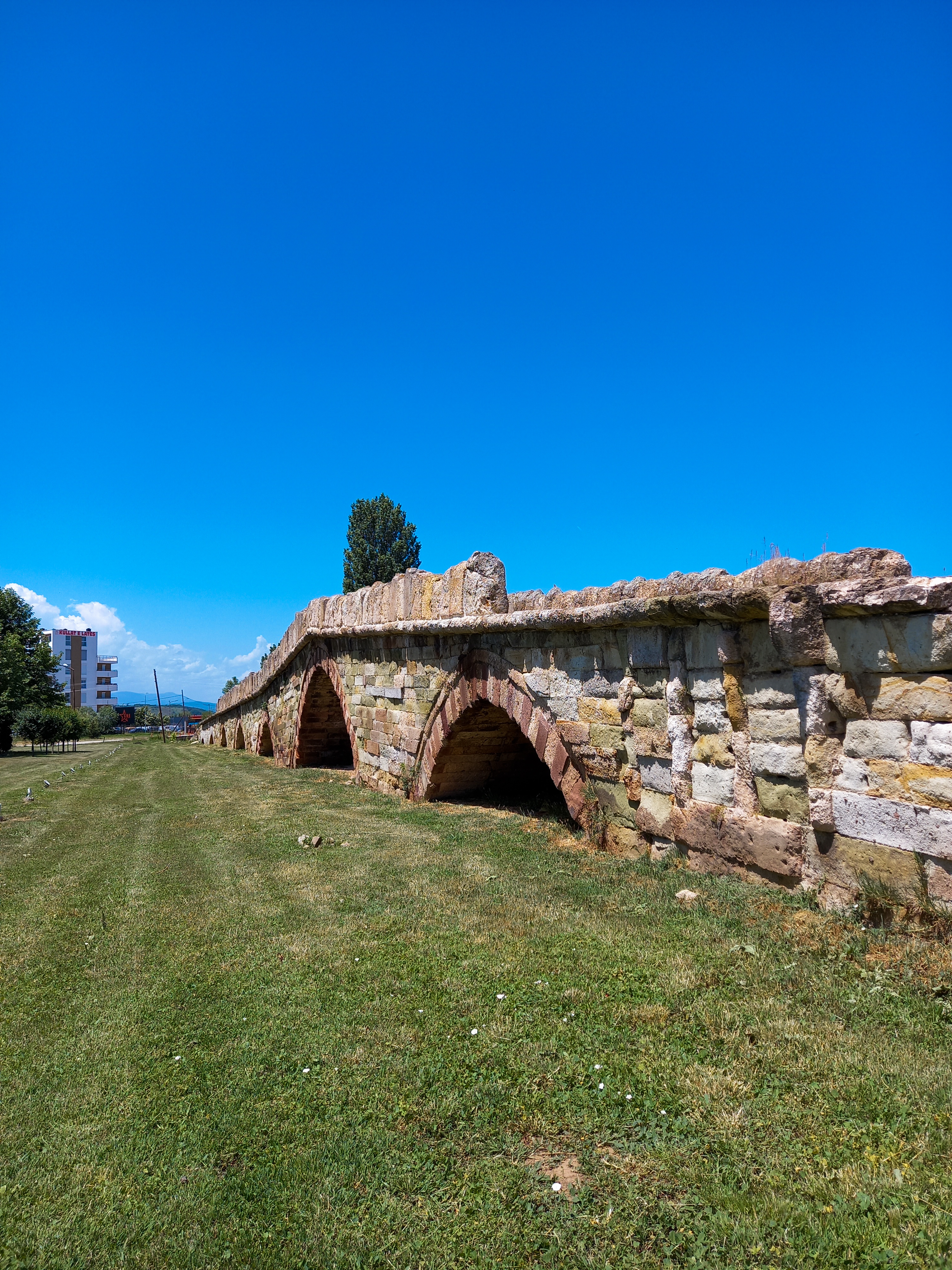
The Stone Bridge in Vushtrri

The bridge carried the caravan route between Dubrovnik and Skopje across the river Sitnica. It is constructed of alternate red and grey trimmed stones. It is over 135 metres (443 ft) long with nine arches, and almost 5 metres (16 ft) wide. The arches are asymmetric, and most of them have a width of almost 13 metres (43 ft). The course of the Sitnica changed over time; the bridge originally had five arches with sharp peaks, but four semicircular arches were subsequently added. The river continued to change its course over the centuries, and deposited sediment around the bridge, so that today the flowing river is no longer under it, and as a result of river sediment, its total length has been reduced.

== See also ==
- Cultural heritage of Kosovo
