= Mladen (vojvoda) =

Serbian magnate

- vojvoda (general, duke)
- Born: Second half of 13th century Kosovo
- Died: after 1326; Unknown
- Issue: Branko and Ratoslava
- Occupation: magnate

Mladen (Serbian Cyrillic: Младен; fl. 1323–26) was a Serbian magnate that served King Stefan Dečanski (r. 1322–1331), holding the titles of župan (count), and later vojvoda (general). He was the father of Branko Mladenović, a later magnate.

Mladen and his brother Nikola hailed from a family that held estates in Drenica, in Kosovo, during the reign of Stefan Milutin (r. 1282–1321). The family was elevated during the rule of King Stefan Dečanski (r. 1322–1331); Mladen is mentioned in 1323 as governing Trebinje and Dračevica, while his brother Nikola is mentioned as serving as governor in northern Albania in 1329. King Stefan Dečanski's confirmation on the rights of Ragusan merchants dating to March 25, 1326, was attended by vojvoda Mladen, tepčija Vladoje, and čelnik Đuraš Ilijić. The Serbian court hierarchy was as follows: stavilac, čelnik, kaznac, tepčija and vojvoda, the supreme title. Although the family was influential, it was not among the most powerful families at the Serbian court. It is unknown whether Mladen lived to serve King Stefan Dušan, as is the case with many other magnates such as vojvoda Vojin and čelnik Gradislav Vojšić.

The last mention of him in documents dates to 1326. He had a son, Branko, and a daughter, Ratoslava. Ratoslava married župan Altoman, the son of vojvoda Vojin. Branko was among the magnates that were given Byzantine court titles upon the crowning of Stefan Dušan as Emperor (1346), receiving the title of sevastokrator.

== Sources ==
- Blagojević, Miloš (2001). Državna uprava u srpskim srednjovekovnim zemljama. Službeni list SRJ. pp. 27, 37, 44, 45, 46, 210. ISBN 9788635504971.
- Ćorović, Vladimir (2001), Istorija srpskog naroda (Internet ed.), Belgrade: Ars Libri
- Fajfrić, Željko (2000a) [1998], Sveta loza Stefana Nemanje (Internet ed.), Belgrade: Janus; Rastko
- Fajfrić, Željko (2000b) [1999], Sveta loza Brankovića (Internet ed.), Belgrade: Janus; Rastko
