= War of Hum =

Armed conflict between the Banate of Bosnia and the Kingdom of Serbia (1326–1329)

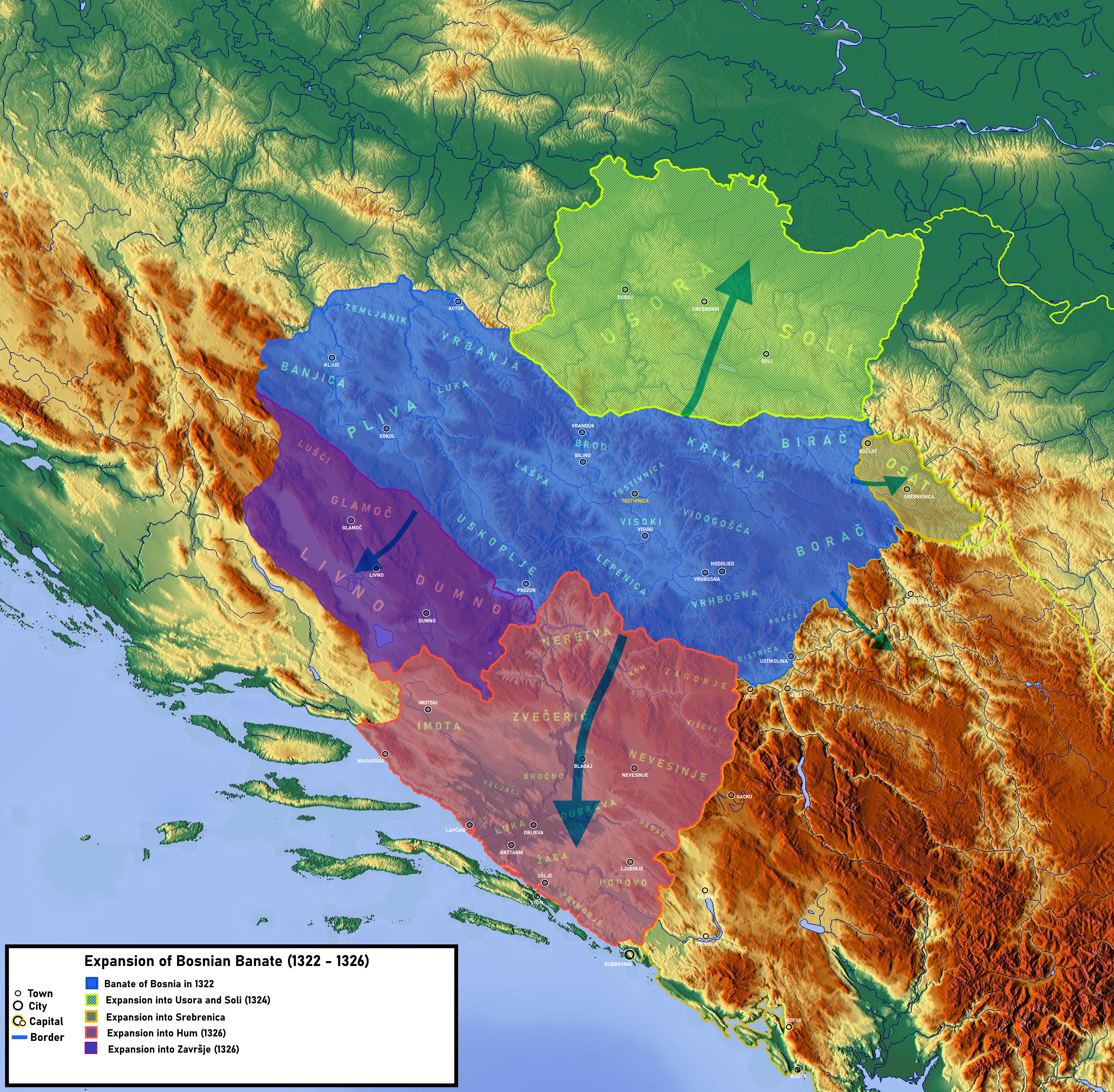
- Expansion of Bosnian Banate during Stephen II reign
Date	1326—1329
Location	Zahumlje
Result	Bosnian victory
Territorial changes	Bosnia captures Zahumlje

Belligerents
Banate of Bosnia; Republic of Ragusa	Kingdom of Serbia

Commanders and leaders
Stephen II Kotromanić	Stefan Dečanski; Stefan Dušan

Casualties and losses
unknown	unknown

The War of Hum was fought in 1326–1329 between the Banate of Bosnia under Stjepan II Kotromanić and the Kingdom of Serbia under Stefan Dečanski Nemanjić.

== Background ==
Branivoje who served King Stefan Milutin Nemanjić (r. 1282–1321) was given to rule over the city of Ston and Pelješac peninsula. His family had by 1325 emerged as the strongest in Zahumlje (or Hum). Probably at their highest point they ruled from Cetina river to the town of Kotor. Though nominal vassals of Serbia, the Branivojević family attacked Serbian interests and other local nobles of Hum, who in 1326 turned against Serbia and the Branivojevići. The Hum nobility approached Stjepan Kotromanić II, the ban of Bosnia, who then entered conflict with Serbia.

== History ==
In 1326, Ban Stephen II attacked Serbia in a military alliance with the Republic of Ragusa and conquered Zahumlje, gaining access to the Adriatic Sea. He also expanded into Završje, including the fields of Glamoč, Duvanj and Livanj. The province of Zahumlje was ruled by the local noble family of Branivojevićs who had tricked Stefan Dečanski's vassal Prince, Crep, who was a close friend, so King Stefan had no desire to defend those areas from Ban Stephen's forces.

Bosnia controlled the territory from the border with Ragusa in Dubrovačka Rijeka along the coast to Neretva, and further to Omiš. Ban Stephen II killed two members of the Branivojević, while Branko Branivojević fled to Serbia and sought help from King Stefan and then headed to Ragusa, from where he proceeded to Ston. Ban Stephen pursued Branko, but eventually the Ragusan forces caught the last of the four Branivojević brothers.

The Bosnian titles included Lord of the Hum Land ever after. Ban Stephen became the ruler of all the lands from Cetina to Neretva with the exception of Omiš, which was taken by the Hungarians.

In 1329, Ban Stephen II of Kotromanić pushed another military attempt into Serbia with limited success, assaulting Lord Vitomir of Trebinje and Konavli, but the main portion of his force was defeated by the Young King Stefan Dušan who commanded the forces of King Stefan of Dečani at Pribojska Banja. The Ban's horse was killed in the battle, and he would have lost his life if his vassal and retainer, Vuk Vukoslavić, had not given him his own horse. By doing so, Vuk sacrificed his own life, and was killed in open battle. Thus, the Ban's campaign was partially successful, as he managed to add Nevesinje and parts of župa Zagorje (area between rivers of Upper Neretva, Bistrica and Sutjeska) to his realm.

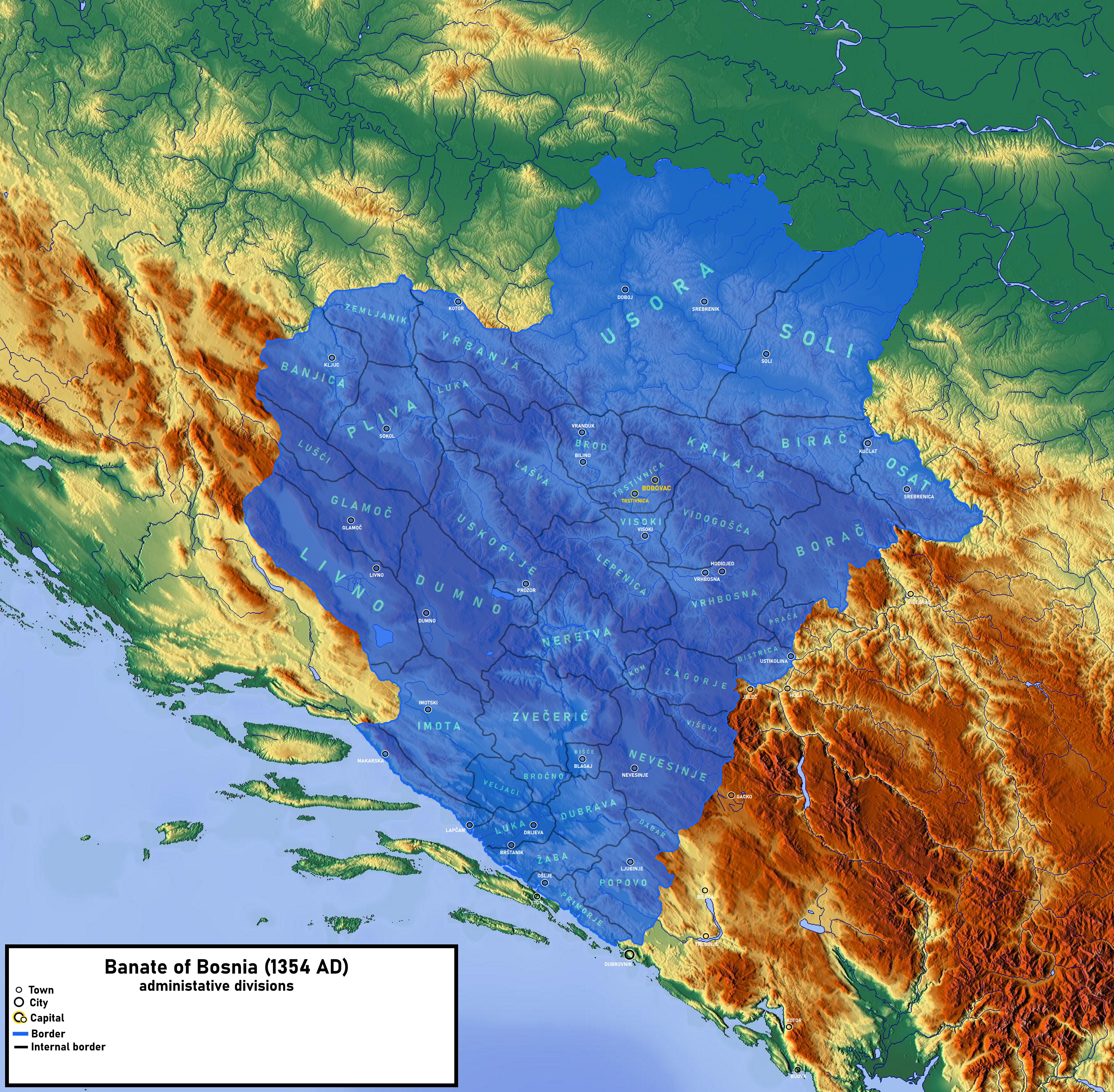

Although the Zahumljans mostly accepted the Ban's rule, some resisted, like Petar Toljenović who ruled the Primorje (transl. Seaside) from his capital in Popovo; he was the grandson of the famous Zachlumian Prince Andrew. Petar raised a rebellion, wishing either more autonomy or total independence. He lost a battle against Ban Stjepan II and was imprisoned and put in irons. Ban Stjepan had him thrown with his horse off a cliff. Peter survived for a full hour after the fall.

The Ban's vassal that governed Zahumlje started to raid Ragusan trade routes, which worsened Bosnian-Ragusan relations that were very high during the conquest of Zahumlje. To make matters worse, Ban Stjepan II asked Ragusa to pay him the old traditional mogoriš tax that they traditionally paid to the Serbian rulers and even asked them to recognize his supreme rule. The Republic of Ragusa refused with the explanation that it belongs to certain Dedić family from župa Popovo and that neither the Serbian nor the Bosnian rulers nor the Knez of Hum have a right to it.

== Bibliography ==
- Ćirković, Sima (1964). Историја средњовековне босанске државе [History of the medieval Bosnian state] (in Serbian). Srpska književna zadruga. OCLC 494551997.
- Fine, John Van Antwerp (1994), The Late Medieval Balkans: A Critical Survey from the Late Twelfth Century to the Ottoman Conquest, Ann Arbor: University of Michigan Press, ISBN 978-0-472-08260-5
- Mišić, Siniša (1997). "Ston i Pelješac od 1326. do 1333. godine". Историјски часопис. 42–43. Istorijski institut: 25–32.
