= Serbian nobility conflict (1369) =

14th century Serbian conflict

- Part of Fall of the Serbian Empire
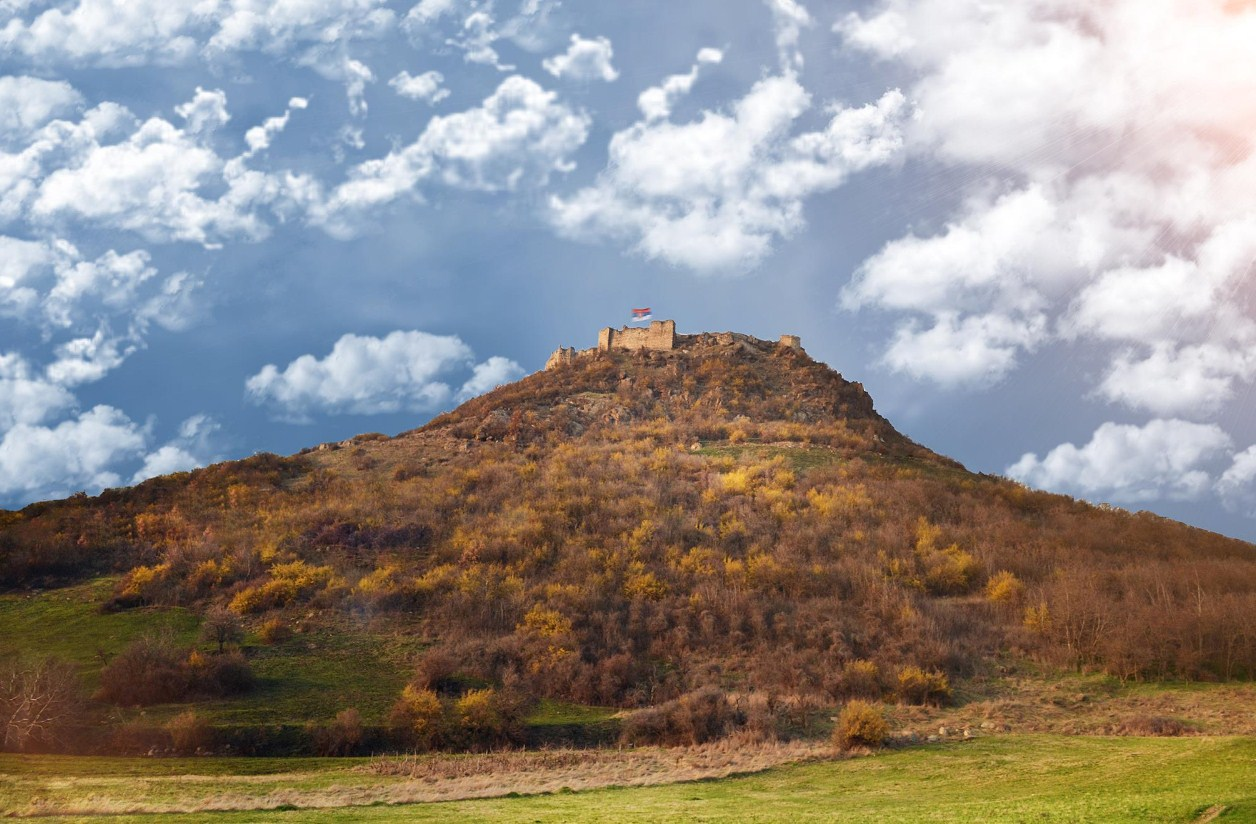
- Zvečan fortress
Date	1369
Location	Zvečan, Kosovo and Metohija, Serbian Empire
Result	Mrnjavčević victory: End of Nemanjić rule in Serbia

Belligerents
Nikola Altomanović, Hrebeljanović and Stefan Uroš V	Mrnjavčević dynasty and supporters

Commanders and leaders
Stefan Uroš V (POW); Nikola Altomanović (WIA); Lazar Hrebeljanović	Vukašin Mrnjavčević; Uglješa Mrnjavčević; Gojko Mrnjavčević Vlatko Paskačić

Casualties and losses
Heavy	low

The Serbian nobility conflict in 1369 was a conflict between two major opposing factions of the Serbian nobility, one supporting magnate Nikola Altomanović, and one supporting the Mrnjavčević family in Macedonia and Greece. In 1369, a battle was fought between the two sides at the Kosovo field, ending in the decisive victory of King Vukašin, confirming his supremacy, which would last until 1371 battle of Maritsa.

== Background ==
Emperor Stefan Uroš IV Dušan was succeeded by his son Stefan Uroš V whose reign was characterized by decline of central power and rise of numerous virtually independent principalities. Stefan Uroš V was not able to sustain the great empire created by his father, or limit the independence of the powerful nobles. Vukašin Mrnjavčević was the most powerful noble in the Serbian Empire, ruling northern Macedonia. Although he was given the title of Despot by Emperor Uroš in 1355, his steady power increase enabled him to crown himself King of Serbs and Greeks in 1365, and extend his claims over west and south Macedonia, Kosovo, and Raška.

=== Preparations ===
Since the Mrnjavčević family desired to succeed the Nemanjić dynasty as the new rulers of Serbia, Emperor Uroš started supporting a coalition of Serbian elite loyal to him. One of them was Lazar Hrebeljanović, who was married to Princess Milica from the Nemanjić family. Lazar and the Emperor managed to persuade the young but capable general Nikola Altomanović to join their coalition, as well as some minor governors. But, since Nikola was at war with Bosnia, he was only able to bring a portion part of his army, because he had to keep large part of his army on his lands, to protect them from the possible Bosnian attack. Vukašin on the other hand, had the largest and the most powerful army in the Empire - which was also fully professional.

== Battle ==
The armies met near Zvečan, in Kosovo. During the battle, the much larger New Nobility, led by the Mrnjavčević dynasty army defeated the Old Nobility, and even managed to capture the Emperor. After seeing that the battle could not be won, Lazar Hrebeljanović retreated from the battlefield with his heavy cavalry. Nikola Altomanovic fought till the very end and was carried off the field heavily wounded by his men. At that time it was even speculated that he did not survive the battle.

== Aftermath ==
The Mrnjavčević family did not manage to make the most of the battle because of the threat even more serious than the local Serbian rulers - the Ottoman Turks. As he was raising an army in Skadar with the Balšić, to deliver a final blow on Altomanović, Vukašin received word from Uglješa that the main Rumelian Ottoman army crossed to Asia Minor. On September 26, 1371, Vukašin ordered a forced march to Adrianople, but his army was ambushed while camped in the Battle of Maritsa, suffering a heavy defeat that sealed the fate of Serbian Empire, and the chance of a serious counter offensive against the Turks. Both King Vukašin and Jovan Uglješa lost their lives in that battle. Two months later, on 4 December 1371, Uroš, the last Serbian Emperor died at the age of 35.

The battle at Zvečan was the place where hatred between Nikola Altomanovic and Lazar Hrebeljanovic was born. Nikola felt that Lazar had betrayed him, and in the future he would even try to kill him face to face. That would trigger a coalition of Nikola's enemies: Lazar Hrebeljanovic, Tvrtko I of Bosnia, Đurađ I Balšić, Nicholas Garay and the Hungarian King Louis I of Hungary, after which Nikola was blinded and deposed of his holdings in 1373.

== Sources ==
- Ćirković, Sima (2004). The Serbs. Malden: Blackwell Publishing. ISBN 9781405142915.
