= Nikola Altomanović =

Serbian župan

- Grand Župan
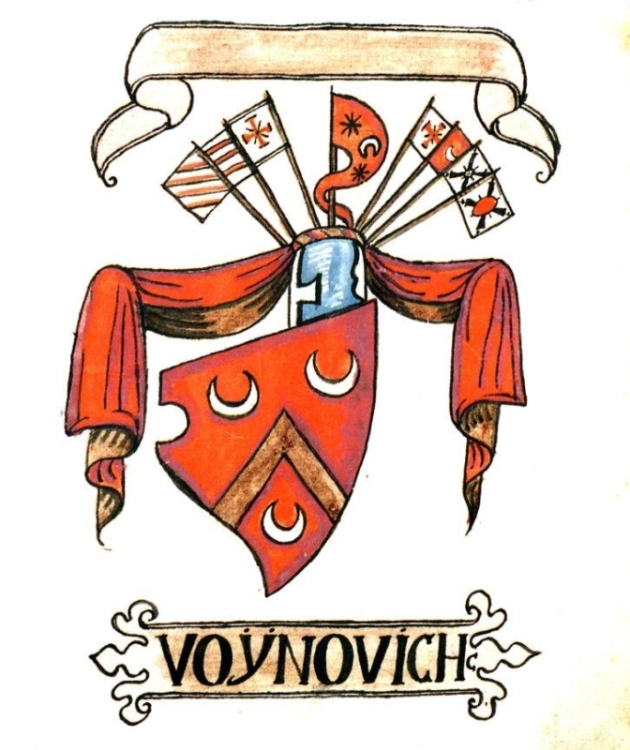
- Predecessor: Altoman Vojinović
- Born: ca. 1348
- Died: 1395
- House: Vojinović
- Father: Altoman Vojinović
- Mother: Ratosava Mladenović
- Religion: Serbian Orthodox

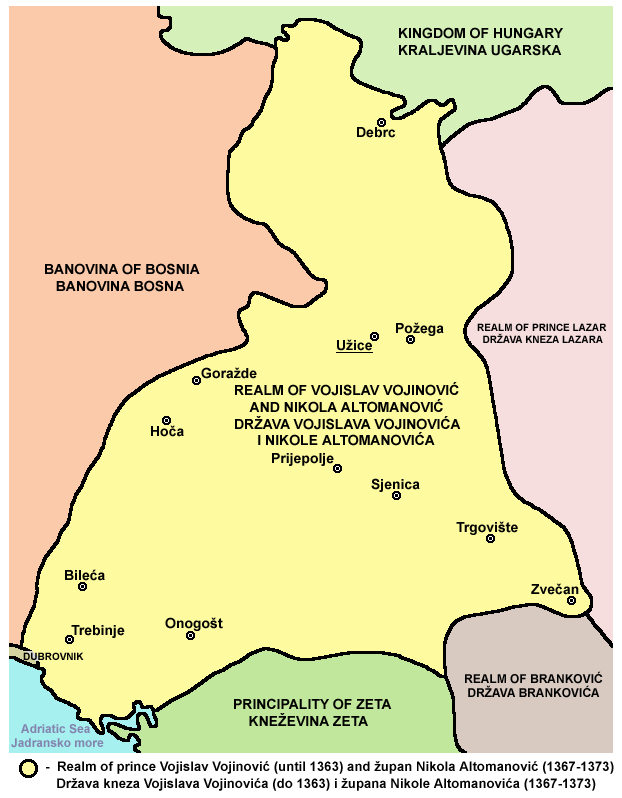
Realm of Nikola Altomanović

Nikola Altomanović (Serbian Cyrillic: Никола Алтомановић; died after 1395) was a 14th-century Serbian Župan of the House of Vojinović. He ruled the areas from Rudnik, over Polimlje, Podrinje, east Herzegovina with Trebinje, reaching as far as Konavle and Dračevica, neighboring the Republic of Dubrovnik. He was defeated and blinded in Užice (fortress Užice) in 1373 by a coalition of his Serbian and Bosnian neighbors supported by the King of Hungary.

== Biography ==
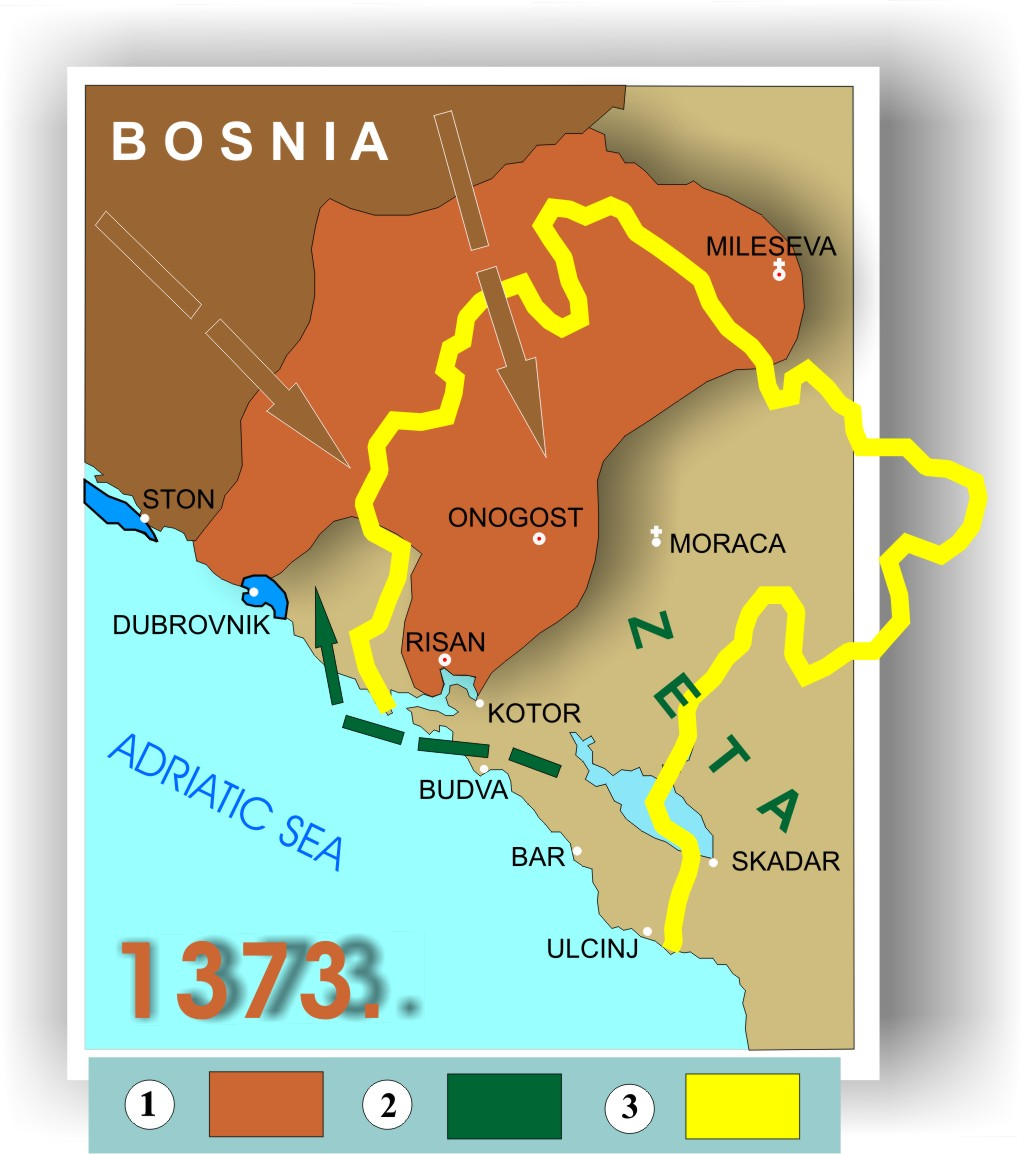
Nicholas Altomanović lost their territories in conflict with a coalition of: Prince Lazar of Serbia, Bosnian ban Tvrtko and King Ludwig I. 1: The expansion of parts of Bosnia Nicholas Altomanović possession, after his defeat in 1373; 2: Temporarily taking Dračevica, Konavli and Trebinje by Zeta (Balsic); 3: Today's borders of Montenegro.

Nikola's father was Altoman Vojinović, a notable voivode in Zeta. In 1363, Nikola's uncle Vojislav Vojinović was killed, which enabled Nikola to take his domains.

As central power and authority of Serbian Emperor was decreasing over the decade after Stefan Dušan's death, the Mrnjavčević family was steadily increasing their power and domains. Nikola allied himself with Emperor Uroš V and Lazar Hrebeljanović against King Vukašin Mrnjavčević and his allies in 1365, culminating with the Battle of Zvečan. The Mrnjavčević were the most powerful Serbian noble family at this point, having a vast network of subjects and allies among Serbs, but also Bulgarians and Albanians, and a large mercenary force. In the battle, Emperor Uroš V was captured early, and Lazar Hrebeljanović retreated with his heavy cavalry, leaving Nikola Altomanović alone on the field. Nikola remained until he was badly maimed, and presumed to have died for the next year. This was also a point of no-return between Lazar and Nikola, rendering their alliance an afterthought.

In fall of 1371, after the Serbian defeat against the Ottomans at the Battle of Maritsa, he partitioned some lands with Lazar of Serbia.

In 1373, a military alliance against Nikola was created, which included Bosnian Ban Tvrtko I Kotromanić, Đurađ I Balšić (lord of Zeta), Mačvan Prince Nikola Gorjanski, and Hungarian King Louis I of Hungary. In the same year, they invaded Nikola's sizeable domain, eventually besieging him at Užice, his capital fortress. He was defeated, and blinded by Stefan Musić, Lazar's voivode. His territory was split between Moravian Serbia, Zeta, and Bosnia. This was also the first time Bosnian state would roughly reach its modern border with Serbia.

The last time he was mentioned as still alive was in 1395.

Ancestors of Nikola Altomanović

4. Vojvoda Vojin
2. Altoman Vojinović
1. Nikola Altomanović
6. Vojvoda Mladen
3. Ratoslava Mladenović

== Sources ==
- Bataković, Dušan T., ed. (2005). Histoire du peuple serbe [History of the Serbian People] (in French). Lausanne: L’Age d’Homme.
- Ćirković, Sima (2004). The Serbs. Malden: Blackwell Publishing.
- Fine, John Van Antwerp Jr. (1994) [1987]. The Late Medieval Balkans: A Critical Survey from the Late Twelfth Century to the Ottoman Conquest. Ann Arbor, Michigan: University of Michigan Press.
