= Altoman Vojinović =

Serbian magnate

Altoman
- župan (жупан), count of the Serbian Empire
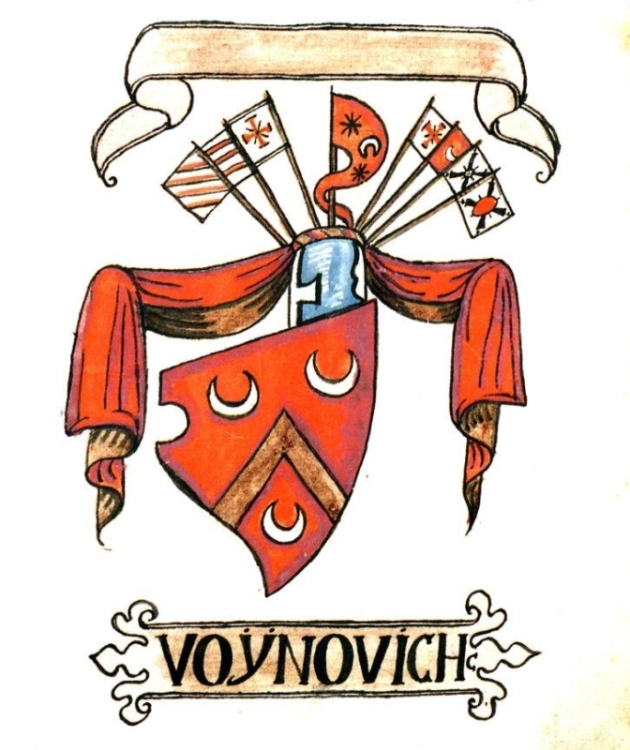

Serbian imperial magnate
- Reign: fl. 1340–59
- Other titles: veliki župan (велики жупан), grand count
- Born: Early 14th century Serbian Kingdom
- Died: after 1359
- Noble family: Vojinović
- Spouse: Ratoslava Mladenović
- Issue: Nikola Altomanović
- Father: Vojin

Altoman Vojinović (Serbian: Алтоман Војиновић; fl. 1335–59) was a Serbian magnate (velikaš) who served Emperor Stefan Dušan (r. 1331–55) as župan ("count") and Emperor Uroš V (r. 1355–71) as veliki župan ("grand count"). His father Vojin was a general (vojvoda) with the title of knez, while his younger brother Vojislav also had the title of knez.

== Life ==
Altoman was the middle son of Vojin, a general that served King Stefan Dečanski and King Stefan Dušan and held the title of knez of Hum. Vojin was one of the more powerful nobles of King Stefan Dečanski, while his sons, Miloš, Altoman and Vojislav, were in Young King Dušan's circle. With the conflict between the King and his son, however, Vojin and other noblemen joined the Young King (1330–31). Vojin's support of Dušan further elevated the Vojinović family.

In 1333, King Dušan sent the eldest son, Miloš, to Ragusa as part of the negotiation team. After the death of Vojin, his sons divided their father's province. Soon after, Miloš died, with his part being divided among his brothers. Altoman was a župan somewhere in the surroundings of Ragusa (being mentioned with the title in 1340) while Vojislav was a stavilac, who then received the title of knez in 1355, after being very active and useful to Emperor Dušan in the period of 1350–55. After the Emperor's death (20 December 1355), it seems that Vojislav progressed, his influence and territory becoming greater.

Altoman married Ratoslava, the daughter of vojvoda Mladen, and thus became brother-in-law with Branko Mladenović, the progenitor of the Branković family. Branko's son was Vuk Branković, a later magnate. In c. 1340, Altoman had the title of župan, while his high reputation is seen from the Republic of Ragusa renting a war galley to Altoman's wedding, which was quite contrary to customs. His son, Nikola, was born in the second half of 1348. Altoman died some time after 1359, which was used as an opportunity by Vojislav who took the territories that Nikola had inherited, most likely leaving Nikola and Ratoslava with only a small part to hold.

According to 19th-century historiography, Altoman was killed by Lazar Hrebeljanović.

== Possessions ==
Altoman's province included Gruža, with the fortified castle-town of Čestin, Rudnik, and the surrounding areas.

== Family ==
He married Ratoslava, the daughter of vojvoda Mladen and sister of Branko Mladenović, the Lord of Ohrid. He had a son, Nikola Altomanović.

== Annotations ==
1. In historiography, he is either known with the patronymic Vojinović, or with his title župan (жупан Алтоман). Vladan Đorđević (1844–1930) called him "the High-Handed" (жупан Алтоман Високоруки).
2. The inscription on the tomb of his wife mentions him and his son, with the titles veliki župan and župan, respectively. This means that Altoman without a doubt had the title of veliki župan, and that his son did not inherit that honour, but only inherited the title of župan.
3. The birth date of Altoman is unknown. He is mentioned for the first time in 1335. He died some time after 1359, when he was last mentioned with a date; his wife died a few years later.

== Sources ==
- Fajfrić, Željko (2000a) [1998], Sveta loza Stefana Nemanje (in Serbian) (Internet ed.), Belgrade: "Tehnologije, izdavastvo, agencija Janus", "Rastko".
- Fajfrić, Željko (2000b), Veliki župan Nikola Altomanović (in Serbian) (Internet ed.), Belgrade: "Grafosrem", "Rastko".
- Смиљанић, Аранђел. "ДВА СРПСКА ВЕЛИКА ЖУПАНА ИЗ XIV ВИЈЕКА: АЛТОМАН И АНДРИЈА ГРОПА." " РАДОВИ" ЧАСОПИС ЗА ХУМАНИСТИЧКЕ И ДРУШТВЕНЕ НАУКЕ 2.22 (2016).

Titles of nobility
Preceded by Vojin as knez	župan of Hum; 1347–59; Served alongside: Vojislav	Succeeded by Vojislav as knez
