= Branivojević noble family =

Serbian noble family

Branivojević
- Country: Kingdom of Serbia (medieval) (fl. 1318–26); Banate of Bosnia (fl. around 1326)
- Founded: before 1318
- Estates: župa (county) of Cetina and Kotor
- Dissolution: after 1326

The Branivojević family (Serbian: Бранивојевићи) was most powerful Serbian noble family of their time, that held possessions in Zahumlje, Travunija, and Primorije, later known as Hum.

== History ==
The progenitor, Branivoje, served Serbian King Stefan Milutin (ruled 1282–1321), and was given rule of Ston and Pelješac. The family had by 1325 emerged as the strongest family in Zahumlje (later known as Hum). In 1326, while serving Serbian King Stefan Dečanski (ruled 1321–31), Branoje Branivojević, as the lord of Ston and Pelješac at the time, was given a great two-handed sword. Probably at their highest point they ruled from Cetina river to the town of Kotor.

Internal fights provided opportunity for the peripheral nobility, which would have bad consequences in western Hum; the Branivojević brothers entered politics in the relations with Venice, Croatian magnates and Bosnian ban. Though nominal vassals of Serbia, the Branivojević family attacked Serbian interests and other local nobles of Hum, who in 1326 turned against Serbia and the Branivojevići. The Hum nobility approached Stjepan Kotromanić II, the ban of Bosnia, who then annexed most of Hum. The Draživojević of Nevesinje, as vassals of the Bosnian Ban, became the leading family of Hum in 1330s.

== Family tree ==
- Branivoje (fl. 1318), a local magnate that served Serbian King Stefan Milutin
  - Branoje Branivojević (fl. 1326), Lord of Ston and Pelješac
  - Mihajlo Branivojević (died 1326)
  - Branko Branivojević (died 1326)
  - Brajko Branivojević (died 1326), married to Vojislava Vojinović

== See also ==
- War of Hum (1326–29)

== Sources ==
- Fine, John Van Antwerp Jr. (1994), The Late Medieval Balkans: A Critical Survey from the Late Twelfth Century to the Ottoman Conquest, Ann Arbor: University of Michigan Press, ISBN 978-0-472-08260-5
- Blagojević, Miloš; Petković, Sreten (1989). Srbija u doba Nemanjića: od kneževine do carstva : 1168-1371: ilustrovana hronika. TRZ "VAJAT". ISBN 9788670390287.
- Историјски часопис 42-43 (1995-1996): Historical Review 42-43 (1995-1996). Istorijski institut. 1 January 1997. pp. 26–. GGKEY:8N4K5PNPTJC.
- Раде Михаљчић (1975). Крај Српског царства. Српска књижевна задруга.
- Istorijski zapisi. Istorijski institut SR Crne Gore c. 1979.
- Ружа Ћук (1986). Serbia and Venice in the 13th and the 14th Century. Просвета.
