= Vojin (magnate) =

Serbian magnate and voivode

Vojin of Gacko / Vojvoda Vojin Војвода Војин
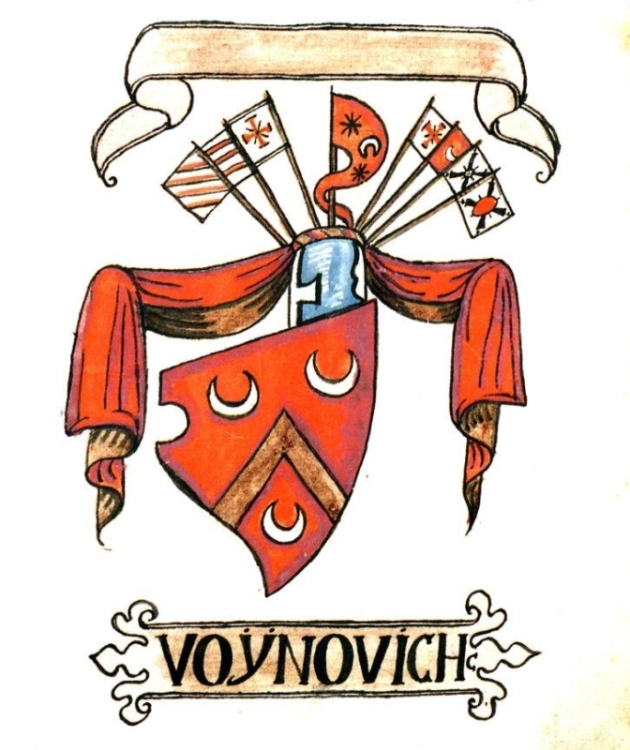

Duke of Gacko
- Reign: 1322–1347
- Predecessor: Unknown
- Successor: Altoman
- Other titles: Lord of Gacko; Vojvoda (Serbian Empire)
- Family: Vojinović
- Issue: Altoman (fl. 1359); Vojislav; Miloš; Vojislava

Vojin of Gacko or Vojvoda Vojin (Serbian: Војвода Војин; fl. 1322–1347) was a Serbian magnate (velikaš) and voivode (military commander equivalent to duke), who was holding the area around Gacko, which was part of Hum, ca.1322-1347. He was in service of King Stephen Uroš III Dečanski (r. 1322–1331) and Emperor Stephen Dušan the Mighty (r. 1331-1355). He is described as one of the most important nobles (velmoža) of King Stephen, and when the King and his son Dušan entered a succession war, Vojin supported the son. Vojin plundered Dubrovnik in August 1325, and took part in the Battle of Velbazhd (1330), and the southern military campaigns of the Serbian Empire.

Vojin is the eponymous founder of the Vojinović noble family, which eventually became one of the most powerful families as provincial lords during the fall of the Serbian Empire. His sons Altoman and Vojislav were recognized as overlords of the Hum region. His daughter Vojislava married nobleman Brajko Branivojević.

== Family ==
- Miloš, mentioned as stavilac in 1333, died young
- Altoman (d. 1359), veliki župan, married Ratoslava Mladenović (Branković)
- Vojislav (d. 25.10.1363), veliki knez
- Vojislava (also Voisava or Sela), married Brajko Branivojević

== Notes ==
1. Time: He is first mentioned during the rule of Stephen Uroš III (1322–1331), and is succeeded by his son in 1347/1348. The date of his death is unknown.
