= Željko Fajfrić =

Serbian professor of law and author on history

Željko Fajfrić (Serbian Cyrillic: Жељко Фајфрић; born February 24, 1957) is a Serbian professor of law and author on history. A lawyer by profession, he has two doctoral thesis on law, and works in his town of birth. Fajfrić was born in 1957 in Šid, PR Serbia, FPR Yugoslavia (now Serbia), where he finished primary school and gymnasium. He graduated from the Faculty of Law in Novi Sad in 1979. He has a magister's degree in Law from the University of Novi Sad. In 1994, he finished a doctoral thesis in the Faculty of Law in Kragujevac. He is the deputy of the President of the Assembly of Šid, Branislav Mauković.

== Works ==
- Veliki župan Stefan Nemanja. 1995.
- Kralj Stefan Prvovenčani. 1997.
- Fruškogorska Sveta gora. 1997.
- Putovanje u Hristovu Svetu zemlju. 1997.
- Sveta loza Stefana Nemanje. 1998. ISBN 978-86-85269-06-6.; 2008
- Knez Lazar i Despot Stefan. 1998. ISBN 978-86-85269-08-0.
- Loza Brankovića. Grafosrem. 1999. ISBN 978-86-85269-09-7.
- Veliki župan Nikola Altomanović. 2000.
- Ruski carevi. 2008. ISBN 978-86-85269-17-2.
- Istorija krstaških ratova.
- Bila jednom jedna zemlja.
- Istorija Srbije.
- Kotromanići.
- Turski sultani. ISBN 978-86-85269-28-8.
- Dinastija Obrenović. ISBN 978-86-85269-32-5.
- Vizantijski carevi. ISBN 978-86-85269-18-9.
- Tajanstveni vitez. ISBN 978-86-85269-23-3.
- Srpske kraljice i princeze.
- Aleksandar Makedonski.
- Istorija Rusije.
- Manastir Piva.
- Dinastija Karađorđević. ISBN 978-86-85269-42-4.
- Istorija YU rock muzike. 2009. ISBN 978-86-85269-30-1.
