= Vojislav Vojinović =

Serbian nobleman

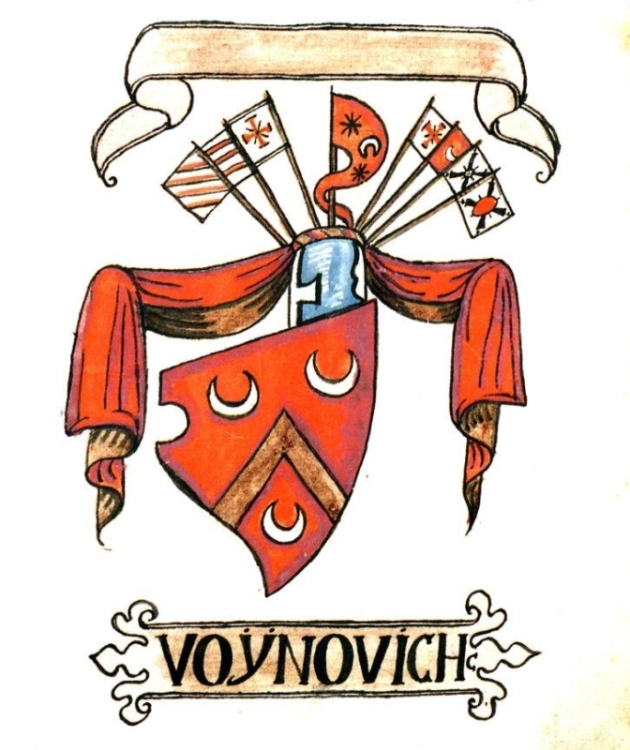
- Born: Vojislav Vojinović
- Died: 1363
- Title: Great Župan of Gacko; Vojvoda (Medieval Serbia)
- Predecessor: Vojvoda Vojin
- Successor: Gojislava Vojinović
- Children: Dobrivoj Vojislavljević; Stefan Vojislavljević
- Parent: Vojvoda Vojin

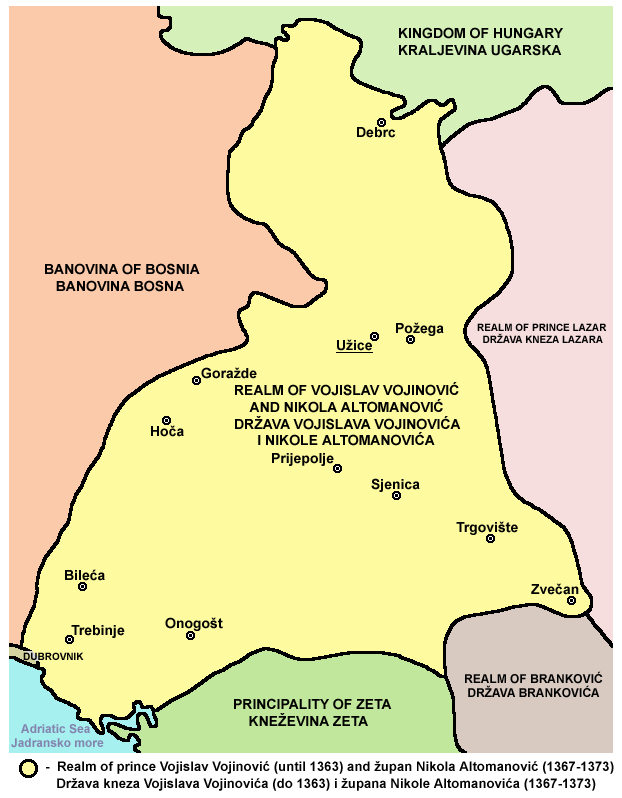
Realm of prince Vojislav Vojinović (until 1363) and župan Nikola Altomanović (1367-1373)

Vojislav Vojinović (Serbian: Војислав Војиновић, d. 1363) was a 14th-century Serbian nobleman, and one of the leading members of Serbian noble House of Vojinović. He held prominent offices during the reigns of Serbian Emperors Stefan Dušan and Stefan Uroš. His father Vojin was governor of the region of Hum, while Vojislav held several positions, from 1349 to 1363. After 1355, he became the most influential noble in northwestern parts of the Serbian Empire, controlling frontier regions between the Adriatic coast and river Drina, including Konavli, Trebinje, Popovo Polje, Gacko and Užice.

== Family ==
He was born the youngest son of Vojvoda Vojin, who had fought under the command of Stefan of Dečani and Stefan Dušan the Mighty IV. His older brother Altoman ruled a part of Zeta.

He married Gojislava and had two sons, Dobrivoj and Stefan. His widow inherited the lands of Vojislav and his brother Altoman Vojinović.

== War with Hungary and Dubrovnik ==
In 1358 Ludvig the first of Hungary invaded Serbia and Vojislav supported the campaign of Tsar Uroš against the invasion. Indeed, as the major magnate in the region bordering with Hungary he was key to the Serbian defense against Hungary and for Vojislav, already influential before, this provided a foundation for much greater influence.

As a result of the Treaty of Zadar Dubrovnik came under Hungarian rule in 1358. Dubrovnik was granted an important concession that it should be able to continue trade with Serbia even in the event of war between Serbia and Hungary. Ston and its peninsula, held by Dubrovnik, had formerly been part of Serbia and crucially as Vojislav considered himself the Duke (Knez) of Hum, part of the Hum. As Vojislav threatened Dubrovnik, "I shall take from you Stonski Rat because it is mine; I am the Duke of Hum and Stonski Rat is the seat of the Hum Duchy which means it is mine". Vojislav plundered the Ragusan territories. During the war 1361–1362 between Dubrovnik and Kotor, Vojislav sided with Kotor; peace was signed in 1362 and the borders were restored.

== Death ==
He died of the plague on October 25, 1363, and was buried in the Serbian Monastery of Saint Nikola of Debar, in Priboj on the Lim, the inscription on his tomb says: "Great Duke of All Serbian, Greek and maritime lands".

== Sources ==
- Bataković, Dušan T., ed. (2005). Histoire du peuple serbe [History of the Serbian People] (in French). Lausanne: L’Age d’Homme. ISBN 9782825119587.
- Ćirković, Sima (2004). The Serbs. Malden: Blackwell Publishing. ISBN 9781405142915.
- Fine, John Van Antwerp Jr. (1994) [1987]. The Late Medieval Balkans: A Critical Survey from the Late Twelfth Century to the Ottoman Conquest. Ann Arbor, Michigan: University of Michigan Press. ISBN 0472082604.
