= Stefan Dečanski =

King of Serbia from 1322 to 1331

Saint Stefan Uroš III Стефан Урош III
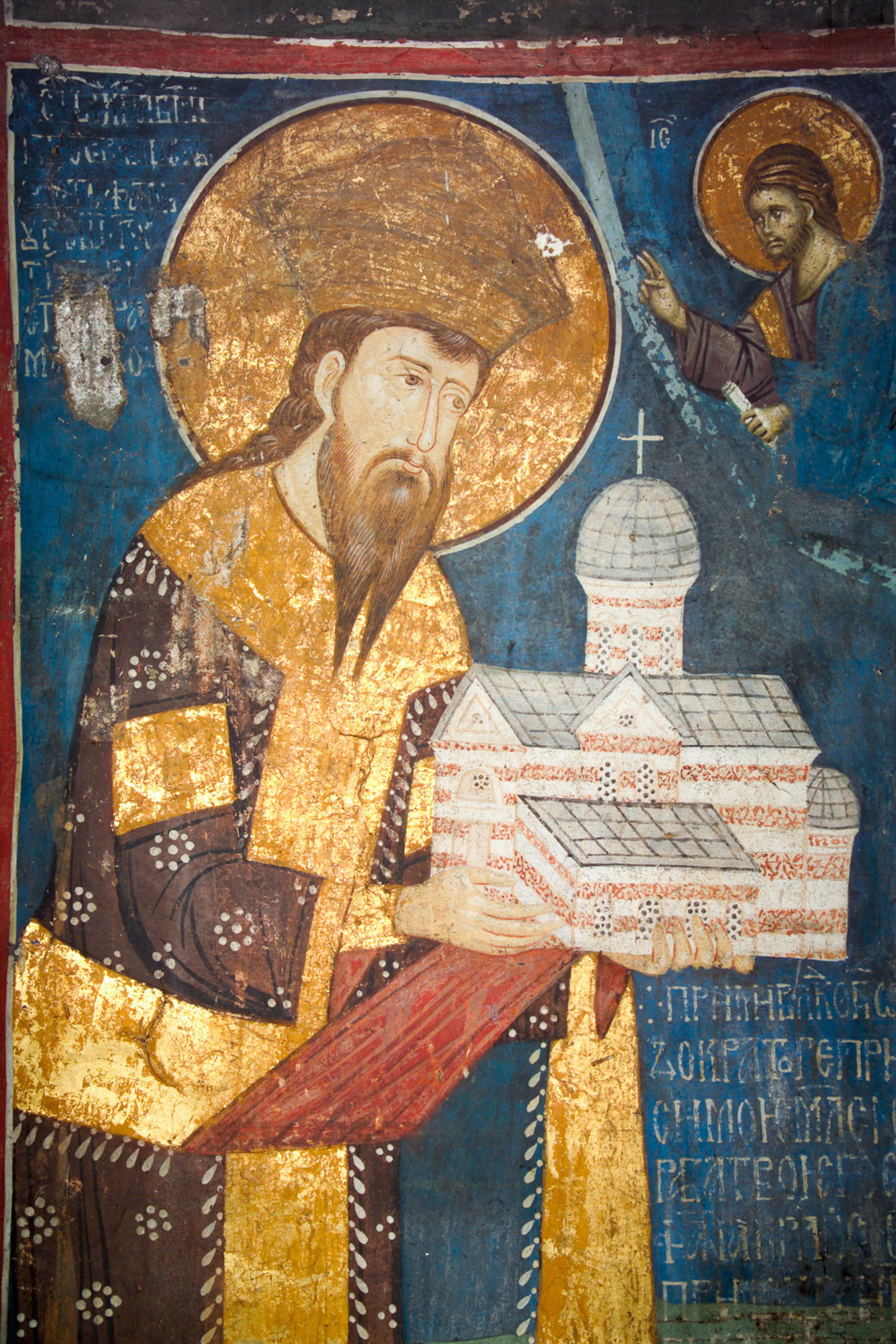
- Ktetor composition of Stefan Uroš III in the Visoki Dečani Monastery

Stefan Uroš III the Ktetor
- Born: c. 1276
- Died: 11 November 1331 (aged 55)
- Venerated in: Eastern Orthodox Church

King of all Serbian and Maritime lands
- Reign: 1322–1331
- Coronation: 6 January 1322
- Predecessor: Stefan Konstantin
- Successor: Stefan Dušan
- Died: Castle of Zvečan, Kingdom of Serbia
- Burial: Visoki Dečani monastery
- Spouse: (unknown); Theodora of Bulgaria; Maria Palaiologina
- Issue: Stefan Uroš IV Dušan; Simeon Uroš; Jelena Nemanjić Šubić; Teodora-Evdokija
- Dynasty: Nemanjić
- Father: Stefan Milutin
- Mother: Jelena
- Religion: Serbian Orthodox Christian
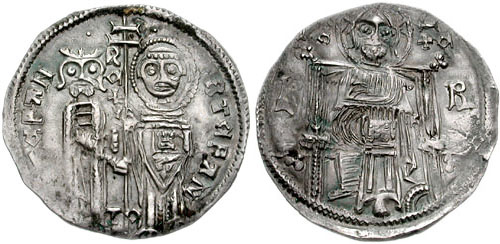
- Signature

Stefan Uroš III (Note: Serbian Cyrillic: Стефан Урош III, pronounced [stɛ̂faːn ûrɔʃ trɛ̂tɕiː], known as Stefan of Dečani (Serbian Cyrillic: Стефан Дечански, romanized: Stefan Dečanski, pronounced [stɛ̂faːn dɛ̂tʃaːnskiː]) (c. 1276 – 11 November 1331), was King of Serbia from 6 January 1322 to 8 September 1331. Dečanski was the son of King Stefan Milutin (d. 1321). He defeated two other contenders to the Serbian throne. Stefan is known as Dečanski after the great monastery of Visoki Dečani he built.

== Early life ==
Stefan Uroš III was the son of King Stefan Uroš II Milutin and his first wife Jelena, a Serbian noblewoman. He was born before his father took the throne in 1282. While still a youth, he was sent (c. 1293-1294) by his father as a hostage with his entourage to Nogai Khan of the Golden Horde, to maintain the peace between the Serbs and Tatars. He stayed at Nogai's court until c. 1297. By 1309, King Milutin appointed his son Stefan (future Dečanski) as governor of Zeta, where he remained until 1314.

== Exile and return ==
In 1314, Dečanski quarreled with his father, who sent him to Constantinople to be blinded. Dečanski was never totally blinded and was likely not blinded at all. In Constantinople, Dečanski was at the court of Andronikos II Palaiologos, indicating good relations between the states. Dečanski wrote a letter to Danilo, who was Bishop of Hum, asking him to intervene with his father. Danilo wrote to Serbian Archbishop Nikodim, who spoke with Milutin and persuaded him to recall his son. In 1320, Dečanski was permitted to return to Serbia and was given the appanage of Budimlje, while his half-brother Stefan Konstantin, held Zeta.

== Reign ==
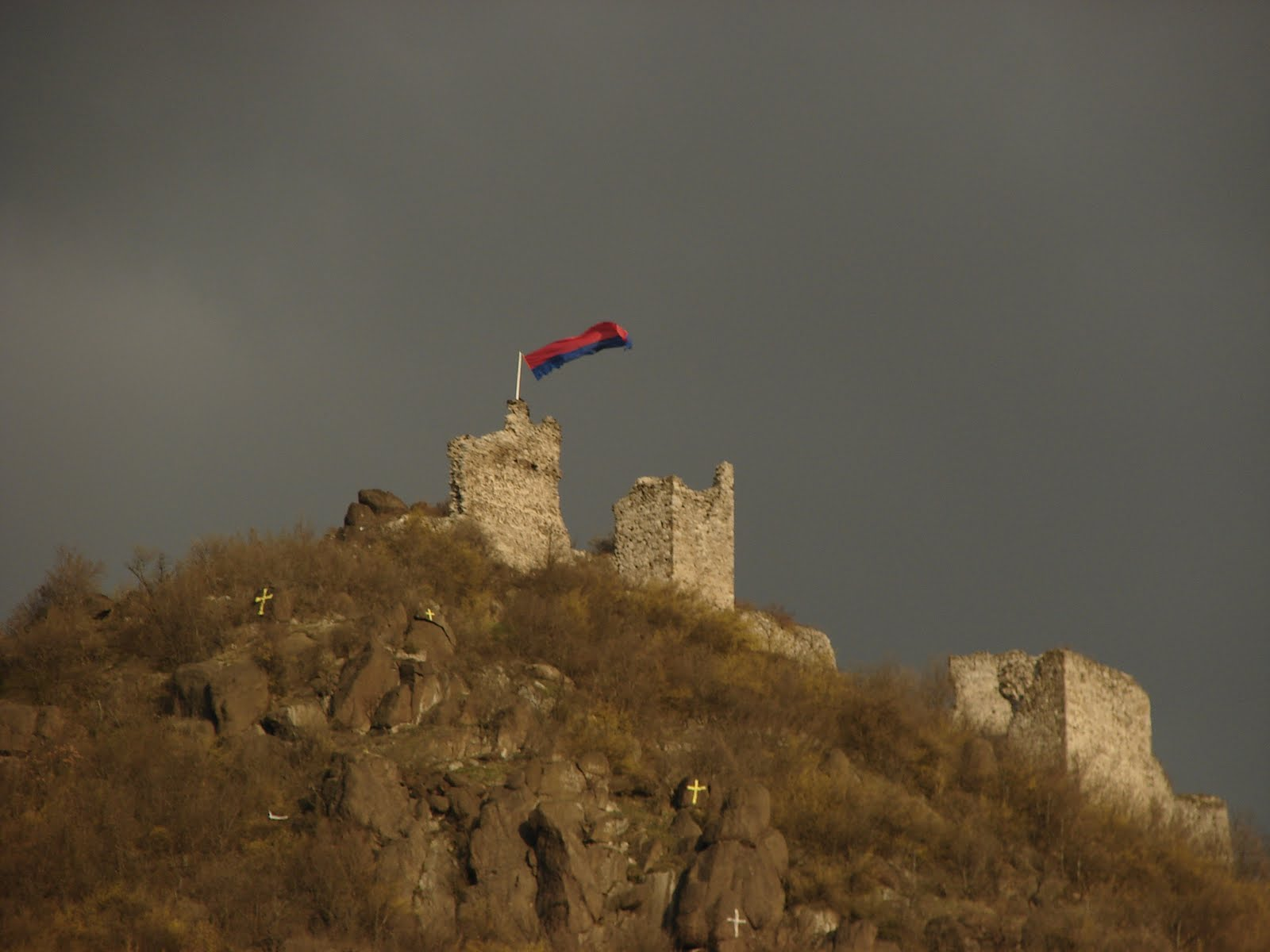
Zvečan Fortress, where Stefan died

Milutin became ill and died on 29 October 1321, leaving no formal instruction regarding his inheritance. Konstantin was crowned King in Zeta, but civil war broke out immediately as both Dečanski and his cousin, Stefan Vladislav II, claimed the throne. Dečanski revealed that his eyesight was still intact, claiming a miracle, and the populace rallied behind him believing the restoration of his sight to be a sign from God. On 6 January 1322, the archbishop of Serbia, Nicodemus, crowned Dečanski King and his son, Stefan Dušan, the young king. Dečanski later granted Zeta to Dušan as a fief, indicating his intention for Dušan to be his heir. According to one account, Dečanski offered to split the realm with Konstantin, who refused. Dečanski then invaded Zeta, and Konstantin was defeated and killed.

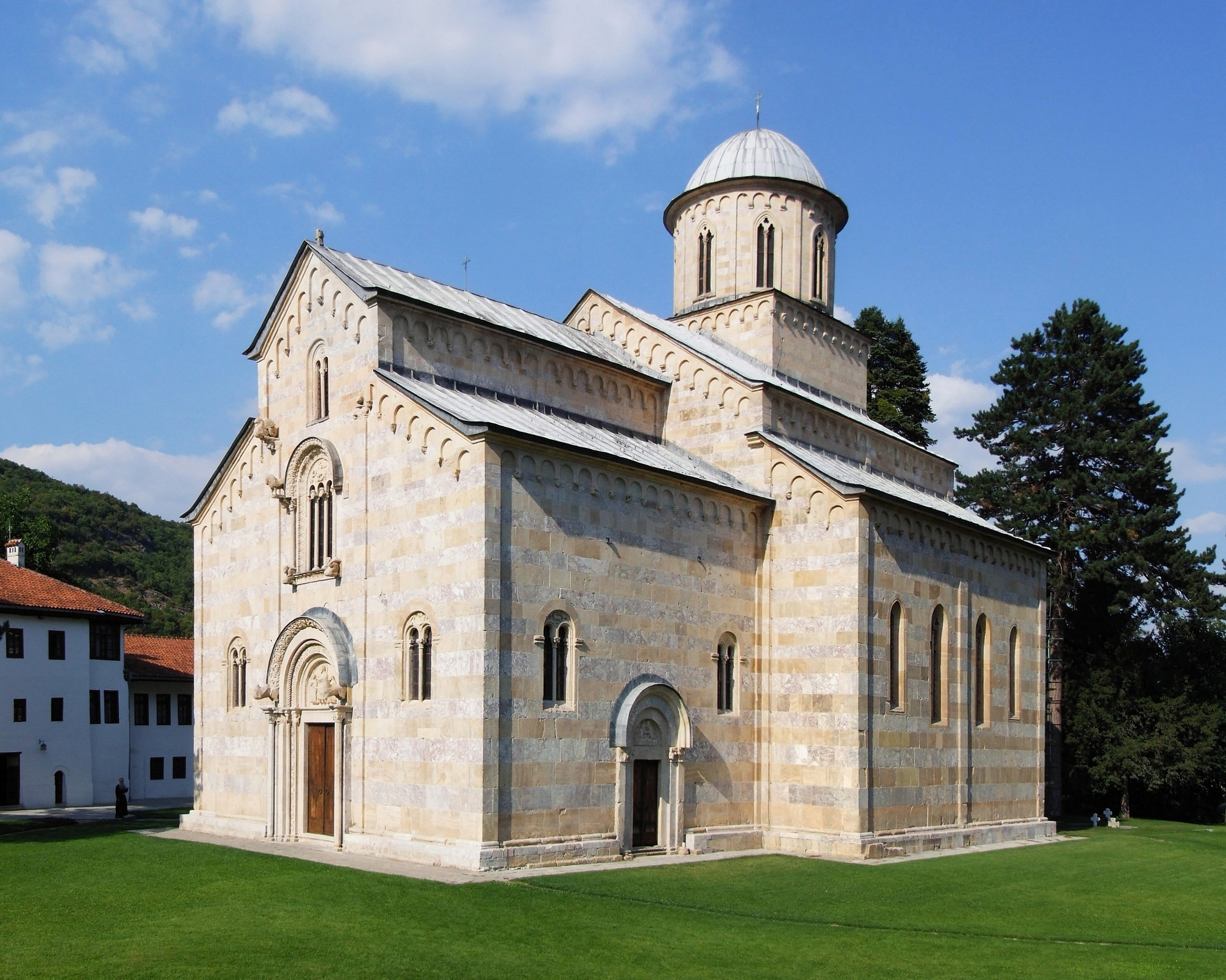
Visoki Dečani monastery, today a World Heritage Site

In the meantime, Vladislav II had been released from prison upon Milutin's death and recovered the throne of Syrmia, which his father had established in northern Serbia. Vladislav also claimed the throne of Serbia upon Milutin's death and mobilized local support from Rudnik, a former possession of Vladislav's father. Also supported by Hungarians, Bulgarians, and Bosnians, Vladislav consolidated control over Syrmia and prepared for battle with Dečanski.

In 1323, war broke out between Dečanski and Vladislav. In autumn, Vladislav still held Rudnik, but by the end of 1323, the market of Rudnik was held by officials of Dečanski, and Vladislav seems to have fled further north. Some of Vladislav's supporters from Rudnik, led by Ragusan merchant Menčet, took refuge in the nearby Ostrovica fortress, where they resisted Dečanski's troops. Dečanski sent envoys to Dubrovnik (Ragusa), to protest the support of Vladislav. Dubrovnik rejected Dečanski's complaint, claiming Ostrovica was held by Serbs. Dečanski was not satisfied, and in 1324 he rounded up all the Ragusan merchants he could find, confiscated their property, and held them captive. By year's end, Rudnik was restored to Dečanski, who released the merchants and returned their property. Vladislav was defeated in battle in late 1324, and fled to Hungary, that was holding Belgrade since 1319. Tensions between Dubrovnik and Serbia continued: in August 1325 Vojvoda Vojin plundered Dubrovnik, resulting in a brief trade ban. On 25 March 1326 Dečanski reaffirmed privileges previously granted to Ragusa by Milutin.

Tensions began again, later in 1326, when Dubrovnik and Stephen II, Ban of Bosnia took actions against the Branivojevići. As a result, by the end of the same year, Serbia lost the region of Hum to Bosnia.

Dečanski generally maintained an alliance with Andronikos II, aside from occasional disruptions. He avoided taking a position in the Byzantine civil war between Andronikos II and Andronikos III Palaiologos. Nevertheless, as Andronikos III gained control, he developed an alliance with Tsar Michael Asen III of Bulgaria. Michael Asen III divorced Dečanski's sister Anna and married the Byzantine princess Theodora Palaiologina instead. The allies intended to join forces for a major invasion of Serbia in 1330. In the most significant event of Dečanski's reign, he defeated and killed Michael Asen III in the Battle of Velbazhd (1330). Prince Stefan Dušan also contributed to the victory.

Hearing of Michael's defeat, Andronikos III retreated. Dečanski's subsequent conquests pushed the Serbian border south into Byzantine Macedonia. Some of his courtiers, however, were discontented with his policies and conspired to dethrone him in favour of Stefan Dušan. In 1331, Dušan came from Skadar to Nerodimlje to overthrow Dečanski, who fled to Petrič. On 21 August 1331 Dušan captured Petrič after a siege and imprisoned his father in Zvečan Fortress, where he died on 11 November 1331.

== Family ==
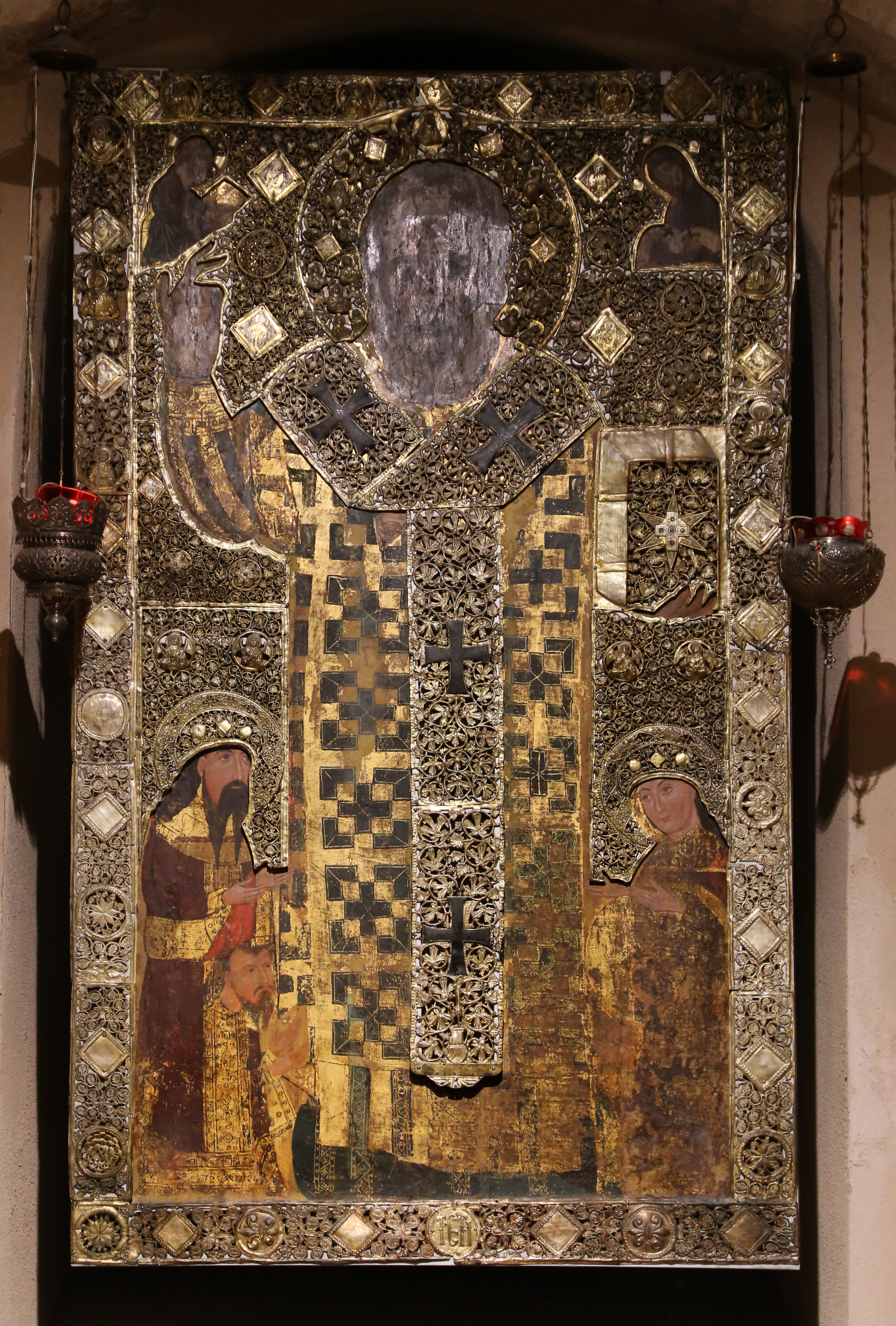
Stefan Dečanski with his son Stefan Dušan (lower left corner) on the icon of St. Nicholas in the Basilica di San Nicola, Bari, Italy

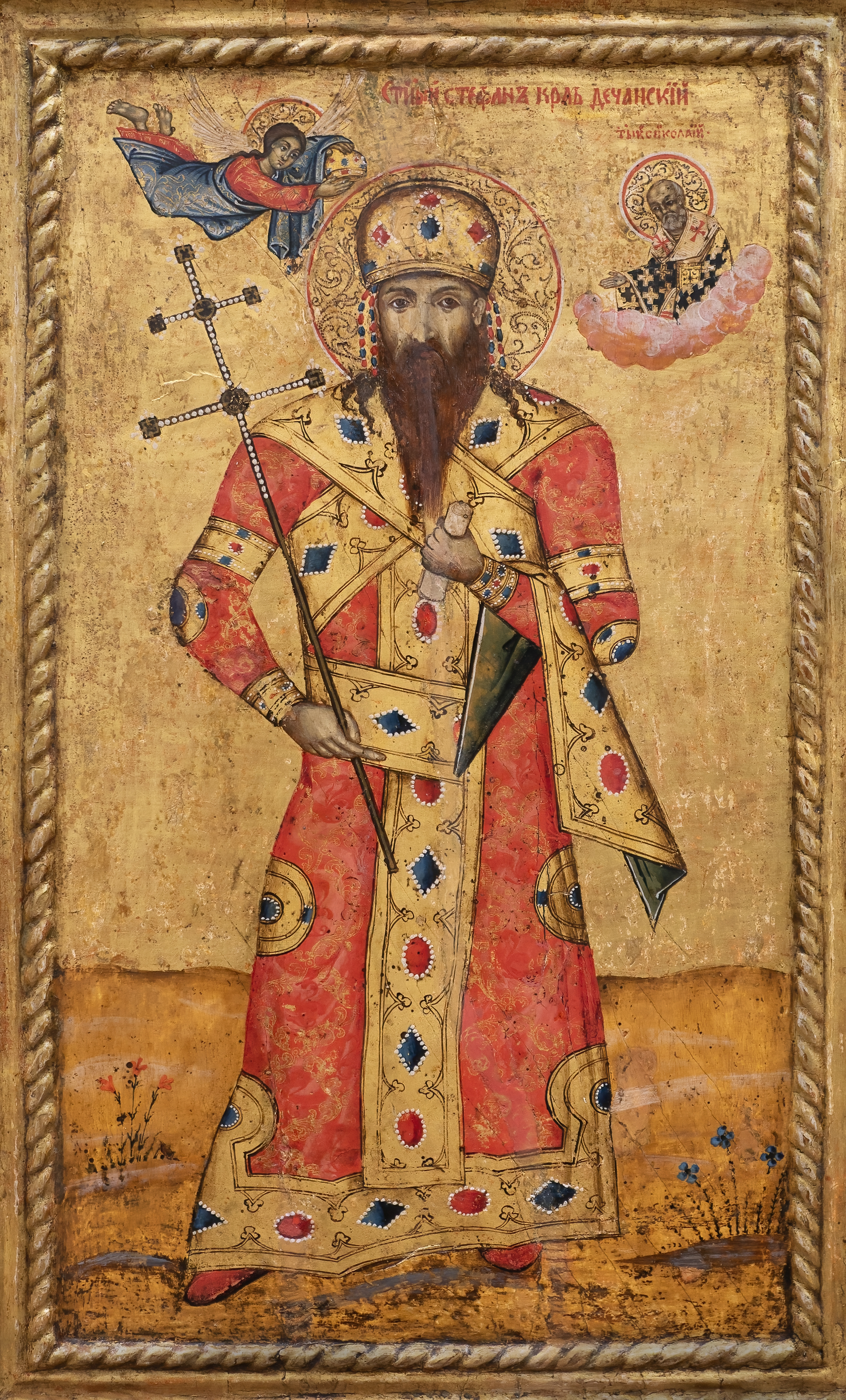
Saint Stefan Dečanski with an angel and Saint Nicholas (above-right), icon from 18th century, exposition of National Museum of Serbia, Belgrade

With his first wife, whose name is not known, Dečanski had no issue.

By his second wife, Theodora of Bulgaria, Stefan Dečanski had:

- Stefan Uroš IV Dušan, who overthrew him and took royal title, and
- Dušica (or Dušman), who died before 1318.

By his third wife, Maria Palaiologina, daughter of John Palaiologos, Dečanski had:

- Simeon, later tried to usurp imperial title from his nephew, and ruled as independent ruler in Thessaly,
- Jelena, who married Mladen III Šubić, and
- Teodora, who married Dejan.

== Legacy ==
Dečanski is seen as a noble character in epic poetry, and the Serbian Orthodox Church had him canonized. His feast day is 11 November (old style), thus being 24 November (new style). His remains are venerated at the church of the Visoki Dečani monastery, which he built, in the region of Metohija.

He is commemorated at the Visoki Dečani monastery through a supplicatory canon chanted every Thursday, as well as an Akathist, which is sung daily at the monastery.

== See also ==
- Nemanjić family tree
- History of Serbia

== Sources ==
- Bataković, Dušan T., ed. (2005). Histoire du peuple serbe [History of the Serbian People] (in French). Lausanne: L'Age d'Homme. ISBN 9782825119587.
- Ćirković, Sima (2004). The Serbs. Malden: Blackwell Publishing. ISBN 9781405142915.
- Curta, Florin (2019). Eastern Europe in the Middle Ages (500–1300). Leiden and Boston: Brill. ISBN 9789004395190.
- Dvornik, Francis (1962). The Slavs in European History and Civilization. New Brunswick: Rutgers University Press. ISBN 9780813507996.
- Fine, John Van Antwerp Jr. (1994) [1987]. The Late Medieval Balkans: A Critical Survey from the Late Twelfth Century to the Ottoman Conquest. Ann Arbor, Michigan: University of Michigan Press. ISBN 0472082604.
- Isailović, Neven (2016). "Living by the Border: South Slavic Marcher Lords in the Late Medieval Balkans (13th–15th Centuries)" (PDF). Banatica. 26 (2): 105–117. Archived from the original (PDF) on 8 May 2025.
- Ivanović, Miloš; Isailović, Neven (2015). "The Danube in Serbian-Hungarian Relations in the 14th and 15th Centuries" (PDF). Tibiscvm: Istorie–Arheologie. 5: 377–393. Archived from the original (PDF) on 1 August 2024.
- Ivanović, Miloš (2019). "Serbian hagiographies on the warfare and political struggles of the Nemanjić dynasty (from the twelfth to the fourteenth century)" (PDF). Reform and Renewal in Medieval East and Central Europe: Politics, Law and Society. Cluj-Napoca: Romanian Academy, Center for Transylvanian Studies. pp. 103–129.
- Kalić, Jovanka (2014). "A Millennium of Belgrade (Sixth-Sixteenth Centuries): A Short Overview" (PDF). Balcanica (45): 71–96. doi:10.2298/BALC1445071K. Archived from the original (PDF) on 11 March 2020.
- Krstić, Aleksandar R. (2016). "The Rival and the Vassal of Charles Robert of Anjou: King Vladislav II Nemanjić" (PDF). Banatica. 26 (2): 33–51. Archived from the original (PDF) on 30 November 2022.
- Mileusnić, Slobodan (1998). Medieval Monasteries of Serbia (4th ed.). Novi Sad: Prometej. ISBN 9788676393701.
- Nicol, Donald M. (1984) [1957]. The Despotate of Epiros 1267–1479: A Contribution to the History of Greece in the Middle Ages (2. expanded ed.). Cambridge University Press. ISBN 9780521261906.
- Nicol, Donald M. (1993) [1972]. The Last Centuries of Byzantium, 1261–1453. Cambridge: Cambridge University Press. ISBN 9780521439916.
- Ostrogorsky, George (1956). History of the Byzantine State. Oxford: Basil Blackwell.
- Sedlar, Jean W. (1994). East Central Europe in the Middle Ages, 1000–1500. Seattle: University of Washington Press. ISBN 9780295800646.
- Thomson, Francis J. (1993). "Archbishop Daniel II of Serbia: Hierarch, Hagiographer, Saint: With Some Comments on the Vitae regum et archiepiscoporum Serbiae and the Cults of Mediaeval Serbian Saints". Analecta Bollandiana. 111 (1–2): 103–134. doi:10.1484/J.ABOL.4.03279.
- Todić, Branislav; Čanak-Medić, Milka (2013). The Dečani Monastery. Belgrade: Museum in Priština. ISBN 9788651916536.
- Uzelac, Aleksandar B. (2011). "Tatars and Serbs at the end of the Thirteenth Century" (PDF). Revista de istorie Militara. 5–6: 9–20.
- Uzelac, Aleksandar B. (2015). "Foreign Soldiers in the Nemanjić State – A Critical Overview" (PDF). Belgrade Historical Review. 6: 69–89. Archived from the original (PDF) on 13 May 2025.
- Živković, Vojislav (2021). Serbian Kings Dragutin and Milutin. The Problem of the Succession of the Serbian Throne at the End of the 13th and Beginning of the 14th Century. Niš & Vranje: Centar za crkvene studije; Svepravoslavno društvo Prepodobni Justin Ćelijski i Vranjski. ISBN 978-86-84105-59-4.

Stefan Dečanski Nemanjić dynasty Born: 1285 Died: 11 November 1331
Regnal titles
Preceded by Helen of Serbia	Governor of Zeta; 1309–1314	Succeeded by Stefan Konstantin
Preceded by Stefan Konstantin	King of Serbia; 1322–1331	Succeeded by Stefan Dušan
