= Gjon =

Gjon (definite form: Gjoni) is an Albanian male given name, clan, surname and onomastic element.

== As given name ==
=== Etymology and history ===
Gjon as a given name is a form of the English name John. It is the name of the apostle Saint John in Albanian (Albanian: Shën Gjon). Most saint names in Albanian come from Latin; John is from the Latin Iohannes, the Latin form of the Greek Ioannes (Ἰωάννης), derived from the Hebrew name Yohanan (יוֹחָנָן), meaning "God is gracious". Both theologians and linguists are unsure about the relationship of the name Gjon to Gjin—the Catholic clergy considers the two to be the same saint, but the Christians of the Central Albanian Shpati region (who are Orthodox) revere Gjin and Gjon as separate saints, while linguists are unsure about the etymology of Gjin and whether or not it shares its origin with Gjon.

In the Middle Ages the name Gjon was very widespread in all Albanian regions. Until lately it was also prevalent among Arvanites in Greece

The name Gjon is also mentioned in the afterword of Gjon Buzuku's 1555 book, Meshari, where the author introduces himself to the reader as "Unë, dom Gjoni, biri i Bdek Buzukut" ("I, don Gjoni, son of Bdek Buzuku").

=== People with the given name Gjon ===
- Gjon Françesku Albani (1720–1803), Italian cardinal of Albanian descent
- Gjon Buzuku (1499–1577), Albanian writer
- Gjon Delhusa (born 1953), Hungarian singer
- Gjon Gazulli (1400–1465), Albanian scholar and diplomat
- Gjon Kastrioti II (1456–1502), Albanian nobleman
- Gjon Kastrioti (died 1437), Albanian nobleman
- Gjon Nikollë Kazazi (1702–1752), Albanian Catholic critic
- Gjon Markagjoni (1888–1966), Albanian clan leader
- Gjon Mili (1904–1984), Albanian photographer
- Gjon Muharremaj, known as Gjon's Tears (born 1998), Swiss-Albanian singer
- Gjon Muzaka, medieval Albanian noble of the Muzaka family and writer of his famous memoir
- Gjon Ndoja (born 1991), Albanian basketball player
- Gjon Progoni (died 1208), Albanian nobleman
- Gjon Simoni (1936–1999), Albanian musician
- Gjon Zenebishi (died 1418), Albanian nobleman

== As surname ==
Gjoni
Origin
- Language: Hebrew
- Meaning: "Grace of God"

Other names
- Variant forms: Gjon, Gjongecaj, Gjok, Gjin, Gjovan, Gjovalin, Johan, Jovan, Ivan (given name), Đonović (surname)

Gjoni,Gjongecaj or Gjonaj is a common Albanian last name, from the given name Gjon. The names Joni and Jonima also have the same source, and the latter (under the modern Albanian form Gjonima) being the surname of members of the Jonima family. The Serbian language family name Đonović is derived from the first name Gjon which means that it is of Albanian origin.

=== History ===
The clan of Gjoni was first recorded in 1306. Originally Christian, it is shared between Albanian Christians and Muslims.

=== People with the surname Gjoni ===
- Dhimitër Gjoni, Albanian noble
- Eglentin Gjoni (born 1992), Albanian footballer
- Eron Gjoni, Programmer, 1st Amendment activist
- Ilir Gjoni (born 1962), Albanian politician
- Ingrid Gjoni (born 1981), Albanian singer
- Marka Gjoni, Albanian Kapedan of the Mirdita clan
- Sadri Gjoni (born 1966), American soccer player
- Simon Gjoni (1925–1991), Albanian composer
- Vilson Gjoni (born 1950), Croatian footballer
- Vladimir Gjoni (born 1970), Albanian football manager and former player
- Vladislav Gjoni, Albanian nobleman
- Xhelil Gjoni (1938–2026), Albanian former politician

== As toponym ==
Gjon, due to historic naming of places after the saint, became an element in Albanian toponyms, contributing to the formation of placenames such Shijon, Shinjan, Gjonm and Gjorm, the difference between the latter two demonstrating Tosk rhoticism.

== See also ==
- Jonima family
- Gjin

== Sources ==
- Pantelić, Nikola (1998). Etnički odnosi Srba sa drugim narodima i etničkim zajednicama. Etnografski institut SANU. ISBN 9788675870234.
- "Gjoni last name - Gjoni family - MyHeritage". lastnames.myheritage.com.
- https://web.archive.org/web/20120211183414/http://www.albanianhistory.net/texts15/AH1470.html
