= Svrčin =

Historic castle in Serbia

Castle of Svrčin
- between Svrčin hill and village Svrčina

Site history
- Built: cca 1321
- Built by: Stephen Uroš II Milutin of Serbia, Stephen Uroš III Dečanski of Serbia
- Materials: stone and brick
- Events: 8 September 1331. coronation of Stephen Uroš IV Dušan of Serbia for king

Svrčin (Serbian Cyrillic: Сврчин; Albanian: Svërçin) was one of the castles of Nemanjić dynasty, built around 1321, on an island in the artificially made Svrčin lake, northeast from present day Uroševac. The exact location of the medieval Svrčin has not been determined precisely because of a lack archaeological research in the areas in which it is localized, but based on the remains discovered so far, Svrčin was situated between Svrčin hill and present day village Svrčina. It is registered cultural monument under protection of Republic of Serbia from 1967.

== History ==
On September 6, 1327, king Stephen Uroš III Dečanski of Serbia issued an edict with a gold seal at Svrčin, written by logotet Rajko, about the events regarding the land dispute between metochion (church-dependent territory) of Hilandar monastery and the county of the Hardomilić brothers Dmitar and Borislav (tepčija Hardomil's sons), in which čelnik Gradislav Vojšić was the arbitrator.

On September 8, 1331 Stephen Uroš IV Dušan of Serbia was crowned as a king, on a council of nobles held in Svrčin.

== Findings ==
On Svrčin hill stone and bricks that were used for building were found. Remains of church of st. John from which the locals extracted stone for building are located in vicinity of Svrčina. During the construction of the drainage trench, on the northeastern slope of Glavica, a stone wall was found, thickness ranging from 1 to 1.2 meters, as well as part of a tegula. Bricks and stones, which are once part of the building are scattered throughout the area.
