= Gradislav Vojšić =

Serbian nobleman

- Čelnik of the Serbian Kingdom
- Reign: fl. 1284 (1st time) fl. 1327 (2nd time)
- Predecessor: Unknown (1st time); Đuraš Ilijić (2nd time)
- Successor: Branko (1st time); ? (2nd time)
- Born: mid-13th century Serbian Kingdom
- Died: after 1327
- Noble family: Vojšić

Gradislav Vojšić (Serbian: Градислав Војшић; fl. 1284–1327) was a Serbian nobleman who served the Serbian Kings Stefan Uroš II Milutin (r. 1282–1321) and Stefan Uroš III (r. 1322–1331). He was the first known čelnik of the Serbian court, in the nearest circle of the King, mentioned serving the first time in 1284 and the second time in 1327. The čelnik was entrusted with the security of Church property from the nobility, and appeared in the role of a judge or executor of the King's decisions, in disputes between the Church and the nobility.

== Life ==
He was born in the mid-13th century. Gradislav is mentioned in 1284, as serving King Stefan Milutin as čelnik. The latter account also mentions a gift worth 400 perpers to the King, and 26 perpers to Gradislav. Gradislav is the first known čelnik (челник, roughly "head, chief") that served a Serbian ruler. He was in the nearest circle of the King, and served at the royal court. The title holder in its early form, was entrusted with the security of property belonging to the Church from the aristocrats, so the holder appeared in the role of a judge or executor of the ruler's decisions, in disputes between the church and the nobility. At that time it was of a higher rank than stavilac, but lower than kaznac and tepčija, with vojvoda being the supreme title. In an edict from 1305–06, Branko is mentioned as čelnik under Stefan Milutin, and is still in this position in an edict dated 1319.

In 1320, Stefan Uroš III (Milutin's son) returned from a 6-year exile at the Byzantine court in Constantinople, and received the appanage of Budimlje, while his half-brother and crown heir Stefan Konstantin was titled "King of Zeta". King Milutin became ill and died on October 29, 1321, and Konstantin was crowned King. Stefan Uroš III invaded Zeta after Konstantin refused to submit the throne to him, and killed Konstantin during the ensuing war.

Next, Đuraš Ilijić served Stefan Uroš III as čelnik (mentioned in 1326). The next year, Gradislav is mentioned as serving as čelnik under Stefan Uroš III.

In 1327, the hegumen of the Hilandar Monastery, Gervasije, arrived at the court of King Stefan Uroš III, because of a quarrel regarding the boundaries between the metochion (church-dependent territory) of Hilandar and the county of the Hardomilić brothers Dmitar and Borislav (tepčija Hardomil's sons); the latter had taken a tract of land ("hills and the ground") between the village of Kosorić and the Kosorić monastery, which both parts claimed as theirs. Gradislav was sent to arbitrate the case, and was joined by twelve local elders that would show the exact boundaries between the parts. The tract of land was in fact part of the Hilandar metochion of Kosorić, and after the boundaries were marked in the favour of Hilandar, hegumen Gervasije, on his own will, decided to give the brothers a piece of land that belonged to the Českovo monastery. On September 6, 1327, King Uroš III issued an edict with a golden seal at Svrčin, written by logotet Rajko, regarding the matter. This was the last mention of Gradislav.

== Annotations ==
1. Name: His name was Gradislav Vojšić (Градислав Војшић; Archaic: „Градислав Воишик“). He was commonly known as Čelnik Gradislav (челник Градислав; in English: Chief or Head Gradislav).

== Sources ==
- Leskovac, Mladen; Forišković, Aleksandar; Popov, Čedomir (2004). Srpski biografski rečnik (in Serbian). Vol. 2. Будућност. ISBN 9788683651627.
- Blagojević, Miloš; Medaković, Dejan; Ljušić, Radoš; Popov, Čedomir (2000). Istorija srpske državnosti, Book 2 (in Serbian). Srpska akademija nauka i umetnosti.
- Blagojević, Miloš (2001). Državna uprava u srpskim srednjovekovnim zemljama (in Serbian). Službeni list SRJ. ISBN 9788635504971.
- Božanić, Snežana (2009). Спор између манастира хиландара и браħе хардомилиħа око Косорића (PDF) (in Serbian). Muzej Vojvodine.
- Ćirković, Sima; Mihaljčić, Rade (1999). Раде Михальчић (ed.). Лексикон српског средњег века (in Serbian). Knowledge. ISBN 9788683233014.
- Fine, John Van Antwerp (1994). The Late Medieval Balkans: A Critical Survey from the Late Twelfth Century to the Ottoman Conquest. Ann Arbor: University of Michigan Press. ISBN 978-0-472-08260-5.
- Matica srpska (1980). Зборник за ликовне уметности (in Serbian). Vol. 16. Novi Sad: Матица српска.
- Srpska akademija nauka i umetnosti (1934). Glas (in Serbian). Vol. 161. Srpska akademija nauka i umetnosti.

Court offices
First	čelnik of King Stefan Milutin; 1284–1305	Succeeded by Branko
Preceded by Đuraš Ilijić	čelnik of King Stefan Uroš III fl. 1327	Succeeded by Jovan Oliver as veliki čelnik
