= Svrčin lake =

Lake in Serbia

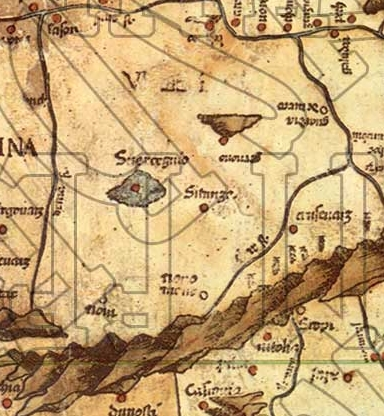
Part of the map Carta itineraria europae by Martin Waldseemüller from 1520. Svrčin lake (Svercegno) and castle Svrčin on the island in its center.

Svrčin Lake (Serbian: Сврчинско језеро, Svrčinsko jezero; Albanian: Liqeni i Svërçinit) was an artificial lake in Kosovo created during the reign of the Nemanjić dynasty, which, in its vicinity, had castles: Štimlje, Pauni, Nerodimlje and Svrčin, located on the island in the lake. Lake was situated in the plain, north form present day Ferizaj. It was made by damming the river bed of Nerodimka river, thus making part of it to flow towards Sitnica.

== History ==
According to the Gračanica charter of king Stephen Uroš II Milutin of Serbia (1282—1321), issued in 1321, the lake was artificially made, following earlier made plans. A channel was dug to connect with Nerodimka, where it turnt south, and Lepenac, with one of the sources of Sitnica - river Sazlija. That way part of Nerodimka was redirected to the north, creating an artificial bifurcation and watercourse of semicircular shape stretching from present day Uroševac to the source of Sitnica. From the west two more rivers were connected, Štimljanka and Košarka, around which was swamp that reached Nerodimka in the south, thus creating a ring of water which became the Svrčin lake. It contained an island in its center, on which present-day villages Laškobara, Prelaz, Papaz, Hamidija, Babuš and Svrčina were situated.

== Role of the lake ==
Svrčin lake had both an economic and military role. Around it castles of Nemanjić dynasty were situated: Pauni and Štimlje on its banks, Svrčin on the island in its center, and Nerodimlje, west of the lake, on banks of Nerodimka.

By digging of the canal, the Svrčin castle was protected by moat filled with water, that denied easy access to royal residence. Water in the moat was used to make fishponds and to drive watermills. Fishponds and watermills belonging to bishops of Lipljan stretched along the lake, from the Sitnica to source of the Nerodimka. At the beginning of Ottoman reign, in census of District of Branković from 1455, it is mentioned that villages Horavica (present day Rahovica) and Tulanovce (present day Talinovac) were obliged to pay 50 akçe each, for the use of the lake.

== See also ==
- List of lakes in Serbia
