= HRL =

HRL may refer to:

- HRL (software), an artificial intelligence program named for mathematicians Hardy, Ramanujan and Lakatos
- HRL, a Rockwell scale of materials' hardness
- HRL Laboratories, formerly Hughes Research Laboratories, in Malibu, California, United States
- Harlech railway station, in Wales
- Hilandar Research Library of medieval Slavic manuscripts, at Ohio State University, United States
- IBM Haifa Research Laboratory, in Haifa, Israel
- Valley International Airport (IATA airport code), serving Harlingen, Texas, United States
