= Lule Bore =

1946 song by Simon Gjoni

Lule Bore is a song composed in 1946 by Albanian composer Simon Gjoni. Lule bore means Hydrangea in English, but literally translates to Snow Flower in Albanian.

== History of the song ==
Simon Gjoni composed the piece in 1946 when he was 21 and a teacher at a high school in Shkodër. He was inspired by the beauty of one of his students during a rare snow day in the city. That day he asked poet Zef Pali for a short text for a song that represented the girl as a Snow Flower, and Pali wrote the poem that same day. Gjoni added the music to the words. From its first performance, its melody has been one of the most popular themes in Albanian music, and has been hailed by critic and composer Çesk Zadeja as an incomparable model of Albanian lyricism. The song was an extraordinary success in a 1956 Moscow concert where the trio Avni Mula-Athanas-Ibrahim Tukiqi masterly interpreted it in front of a Russian audience. The success repeated itself in a Youth Festival in 1961 in Vienna The song is very often sung by Albanian-American communities at their gatherings.
