= Saint George Tower, Hilandar =

Tower in Serbian Orthodox Hilandar Monastery

Saint George Tower кула Светог Ђорђа kula Svetog Đorđa Πύργος του Αγίου Γεωργίου
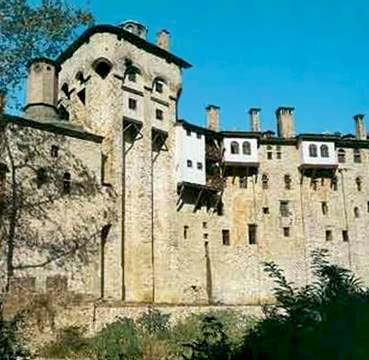
- Interactive map of the Saint George Tower кула Светог Ђорђа kula Svetog Đorđa; Πύργος του Αγίου Γεωργίου area

General information
- Coordinates: 40°20′22″N 24°07′14″E
- Year built: 12th–13th century
- Owner: Hilandar Monastery

Saint George Tower (Serbian: кула Светог Ђорђа, romanized: kula Svetog Đorđa, Greek: Πύργος του Αγίου Γεωργίου) is a medieval defensive structure dedicated to Saint George, located in Serbian Orthodox Hilandar Monastery in Mount Athos, Greece.

== Location ==
The tower is one of two towers on Hilandar's fortress wall, located on the south side. On the eastern side is the larger Tower of Saint Sava.

== History ==
The initial construction phase of the tower probably refers to the end of the 12th century by Serbian Grand Prince Stefan Nemanja. The second construction phase also includes the chapel of the same name at the top of the tower, which was frescoed around 1260.

== See also ==
- Milutin Tower
- Saint Sava Tower
