= Saint Sava Tower, Hilandar =

Tower in Serbian Orthodox Hilandar Monastery

Saint Sava Tower Светосавска кула Svetosavska kula Πύργος του Αγίου Σάββα
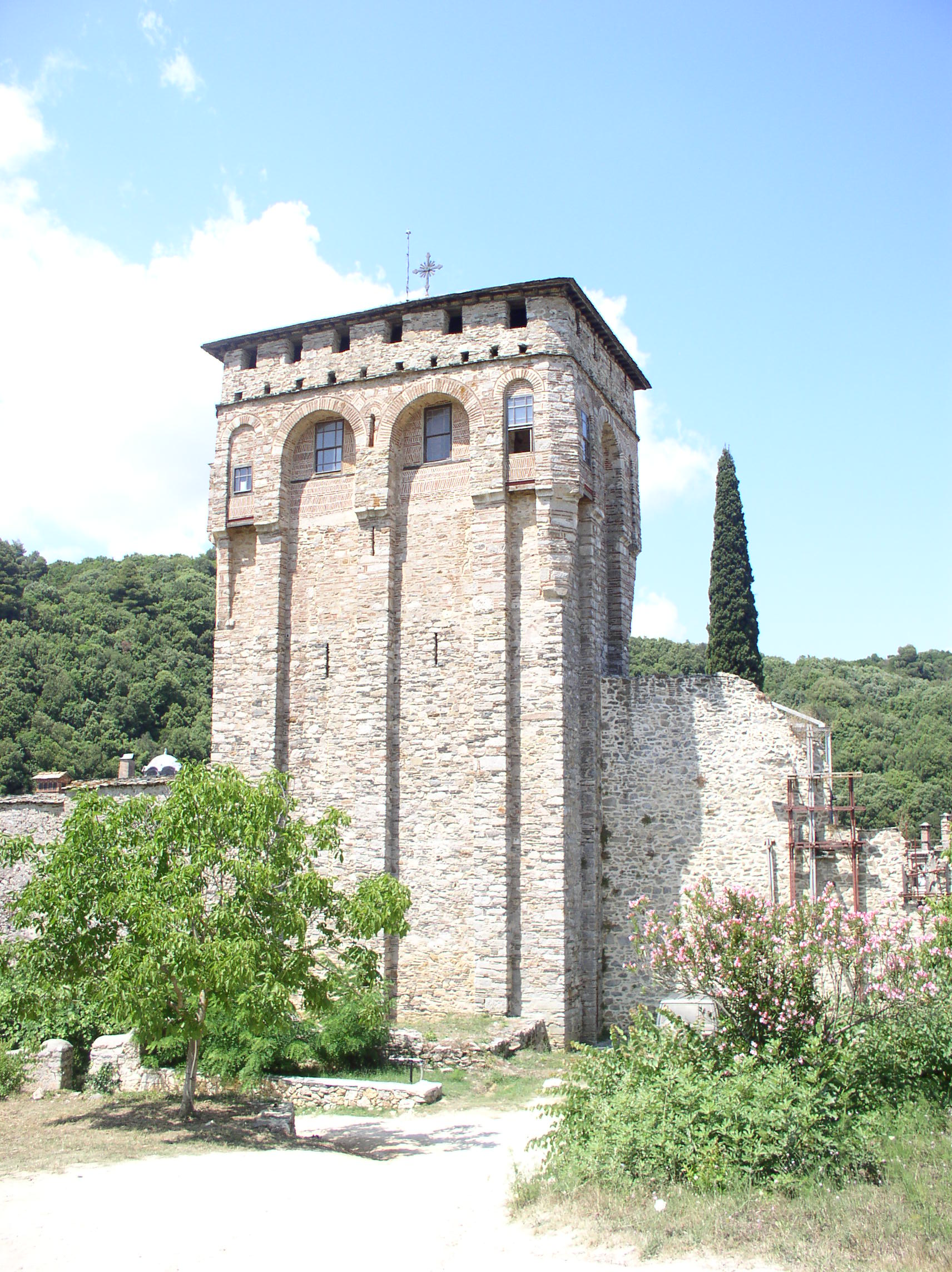
- Interactive map of the Saint Sava Tower; Светосавска кула Svetosavska kula Πύργος του Αγίου Σάββα area

General information
- Architectural style: Late Byzantine
- Coordinates: 40.3400°N 24.1213°E
- Year built: 13th century
- Owner: Hilandar Monastery

Technical details
- Floor count: 4
- Floor area: 8.5 m x 13.5 m

Saint Sava Tower (Serbian: Светосавска кула, romanized: Svetosavska kula, Greek: Πύργος του Αγίου Σάββα) is a medieval defensive structure dedicated to Saint Sava, located in Serbian Orthodox Hilandar Monastery in Mount Athos, Greece.

== Location ==
The tower is one of the two towers on the Hilandar rock, located on the eastern side. On the south side is the smaller Saint George Tower.

== History ==
The oldest construction phase of the tower, which represents its main body, refers to the end of the 12th century and is attributed to the founder of the Saint Sava monastery. The second phase is from the beginning of the 13th century and is attributed to the Serbian King Stefan Milutin.

The third important phase took place in 1682–1684. That tower is covered with a four-pitched roof made of stone slabs. In this phase, decorations with complex ceramics were made on the sides of the external masonry on the upper part between the arches and the fortress walls.

== Description ==
The tower has dimensions of 8.5 m x 13.5 m. It consists of a basement, ground floor and 4 floors. On the last floor, below the level of the fortifications, there is a one-room chapel dedicated to St. John the Baptist.

The tower of Saint Sava follows the general characteristics of the towers of this type, but shows a peculiarity regarding the symmetry and the scale of the projection of the pilasters from the level of its exterior masonry.

== See also ==
- Milutin Tower
- Saint George Tower
