= Fior Jonima =

Albanian nobleman from the Jonima family

- Born: Unknown
- Noble family: Jonima family

Fior Jonima, also known as Flor or Florio, was a 15th-century Albanian nobleman from the Jonima family. He belonged to the Albanian aristocracy of northern Albania and was active in Shkodër during Venetian Albania, where he served as the city's ambassador to the Venetian authorities in 1470 and later acted as commander of the city's guards during the Ottoman Siege of Shkodër in 1478–1479.

== Life ==
Fior Jonima was born in the 15th century into the Jonima family which was a very prominent noble family in northern Albania that traditionally held lands between the Mat and Ishëm rivers. Little is known about his early life.

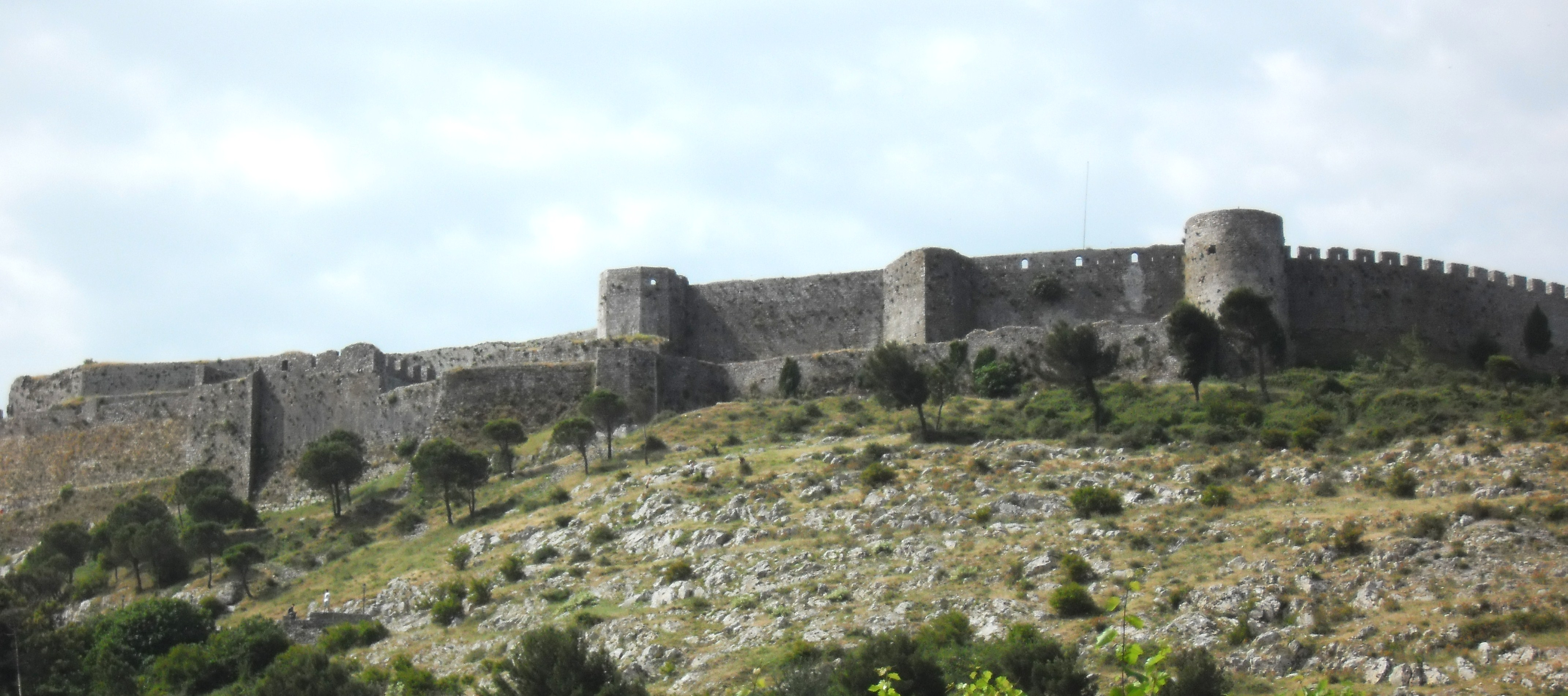
Rozafa Castle

His family had maintained a residence near the castle walls of Rozafa Castle in Shkodër and it was located just below the tower that today stands above the city's second main gate. The house however was eventually surrendered sometime between the years of 1403 and 1416 to strengthen the fortifications of the main gate. The ruins of this house were still visible as late as 1961.

By 1470, Fior was active in Shkodër, which at the time was under Venetian control, serving as the city's ambassador to the Venetian authorities. In this role, he, along with other prominent citizens such as the merchant Piero Polo Zane and the Shkodër patrician Stefano Sabin, submitted reports to the Venetian office of the Governatori delle pubbliche entrate. These reports detailed the aftermath of the Ottoman campaigns of 1466-1467 and addressed Venice's inquiries regarding why the province of Albania had failed to pay taxes in the preceding years.

His most notable work is a letter that he wrote on 28 December 1470 that is titled A Ravaged Land. In this letter, Fior described in very great detail the widespread destruction of towns and villages the depopulation of the countryside and the kidnappings and plundering carried out by the Ottoman Empire and the local feudal lords. This letter is considered to be the earliest known personal account from an Albanian describing the consequences of the Ottoman military campaigns.

A Ravaged Land

"I, Fior Jonima, citizen of Skutari [Shkodra] and presently ambassador of this community, was asked, on the orders of the Magnificent Lord Administrator of Revenues, what I knew about the deeds of the Turks in this part of Albania for the years 1466 and 1467.

I can state that around the end of April 1466, the Grand Turk arrived in this country in person and sent his captain forth who scoured the country and pillaged it. He stole many animals and kidnapped many people.

When he departed, Ballaban arrived to besiege Croia [Kruja]. He too robbed and pillaged the towns of the Signoria, and kidnapped many people.

Soon thereafter, Sinan Bey arrived, who brought about even greater ruin and destruction. He had animals and people kidnapped and put the country to the torch.

After this came the Voyvod of Serbia, called Amur Bey, who caused great destruction. Not only did he steal endless numbers of animals, he also put the country to the torch and kidnapped quite a few people.

Then came Lord Progon Dukagjin, who also robbed and put to the torch whatever was left over.

The Grand Turk came back to this country in 1467 and sent the Pasha of Romania [Roumeli] out with a strong army [to subdue it]. He robbed, pillaged and took endless numbers of people off with him. When he had had his fill of robbing and pillaging, he continued on to the region of Skutari where he came to blows with the people. He finally got into the open town outside the fortress, which he robbed and pillaged.

Then came a Voyvod called Feriz Bey who also robbed and pillaged.

Then came Nikola Dukagjin, who also robbed, pillaged and kidnapped many people.

After this, the Voyvod of Serbia came back a second time to rob and pillage and kidnap more people.

Then came the Voyvod of Dibra who robbed, pillaged and kidnapped many people.

In conclusion, I can say that in the period in question, this country was turned into a wasteland. It has remained as such up to the present day. Gone are not only the settlements, but also the people, with the exception of those few villages that have been rebuilt. It would thus be necessary for prisoners who have been convicted or banned to be pardoned and sent to this country [to repopulate it]."

— Fior Jonima, 28 December 1470

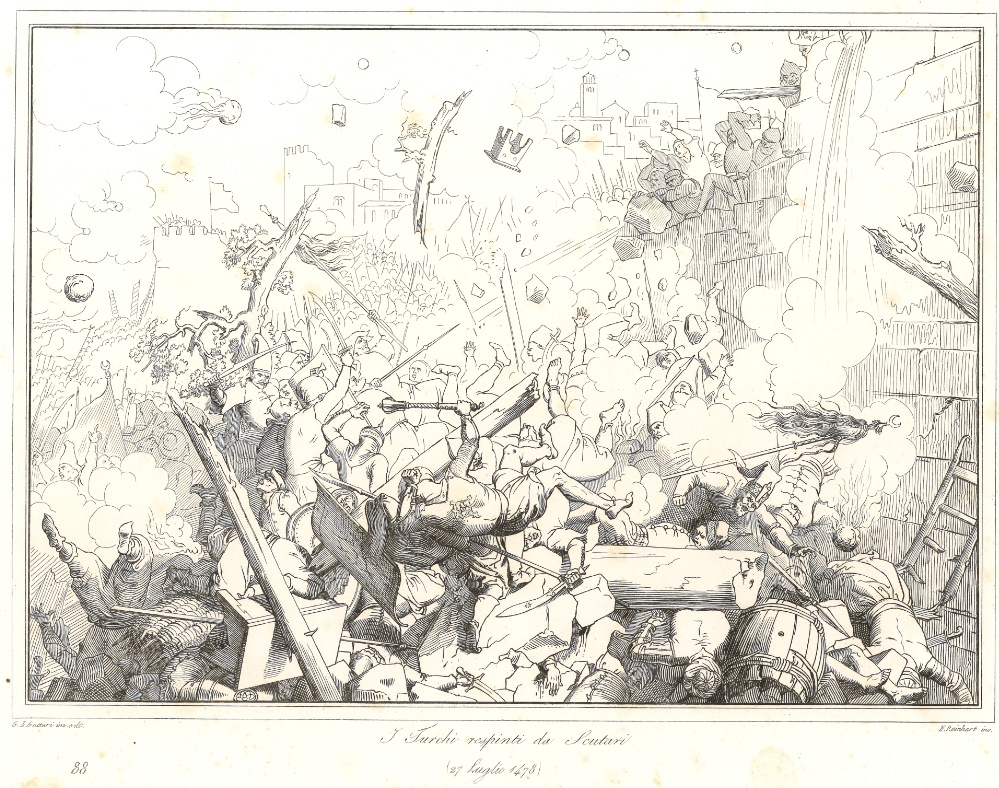
1860 etching of the 1478 Siege of Shkodër

By 1478, Fior Jonima was serving as commander of the city's guards in Shkodër during the Ottoman Siege of Shkodra. He addressed the citizens of Shkodër and urged them to leave the city and to seek refuge in Venice rather than remain under Ottoman control. Jonima cited decades of repeated Ottoman incursions and destruction as justification for the decision.

The citizens of Shkodër ultimately agreed to evacuate and Venetian authorities provided hostages to guarantee that the citizens could depart safely. The surrender and evacuation took place only after these assurances were made.

== See also ==
- Jonima family

== Bibliography ==
- Barleti, Marin (2012). The Siege of Shkodra Albania's Courageous Stand Against Ottoman Conquest,1478. Onufri Publishing House. ISBN 978-9-9956-8777-9.
- Calic, Marie-Janine (2019). The Great Cauldron A History of Southeastern Europe. Harvard University Press. ISBN 978-0-6749-8392-2.
- Elsie, Robert (2001). 1470 Fior Jonima: A Ravaged Land.
- Schmitt, Oliver Jens (2001). Das venezianische Albanien (1392-1479) [Venetian Albania (1392-1479)] (in German). Oldenbourg. ISBN 978-3-4865-6569-0.
- Yamey, Adam (2014). From Albania to Sicily. ISBN 978-1-2919-8068-4.
