= Đonović =

- Language: Serbian

Origin
- Language: serbian
- Origin: Jovan
- Derivation: from the first name Gjon→Đono (Jovan→Gjon→Đono→Đonović)

Đonović (Serbian Cyrillic: Ђоновић; also transliterated Djonović) is a Serbian language family name derived from the first name Gjon of origin. According to the legends of many Montenegrin highlander tribes, their ancestors came from Albania, so surnames like Đonović and Zogović point to Slavicization of . According to Mihajlo Petrović, some people with Đonović surname claimed that their ancestor was catholic. Đonović surname is mentioned in Dečani chrysobulls in early 14th century.

== See also ==
- Vojislav Đonović (November 18, 1921 – January 5, 2008), a famous Serbian jazz guitarist - soloist, composer and arranger.

== Sources ==
- Pantelić, Nikola (1998). Etnički odnosi Srba sa drugim narodima i etničkim zajednicama. Etnografski institut SANU. ISBN 9788675870234.
- Зечевић, др Слободан (1981). Гласник Етнографског музеја у Београду књ. 45: Bulletin of the Ethnographic Museum in Beograd. Etnografski muzej u Beogradu. GGKEY:FWHZ5Y2J8NF.
- Petrović, Mihailo (1941). Đerdapski ribolovi u prošlosti i u sadašnjosti. Izd. Zadužbine Mikh. R. Radivojeviča.
- Grković, Milica (1983). Imena u Dečanskim hrisovuljama. Filozofski fakultet u Novom Sadu, Institut za južnoslovenske jezike.
