= Milutin Tower, Hilandar =

Tower in Serbian Orthodox Hilandar Monastery

Milutin Tower кула Милутина kula Milutina Πύργος του Μιλούτιν
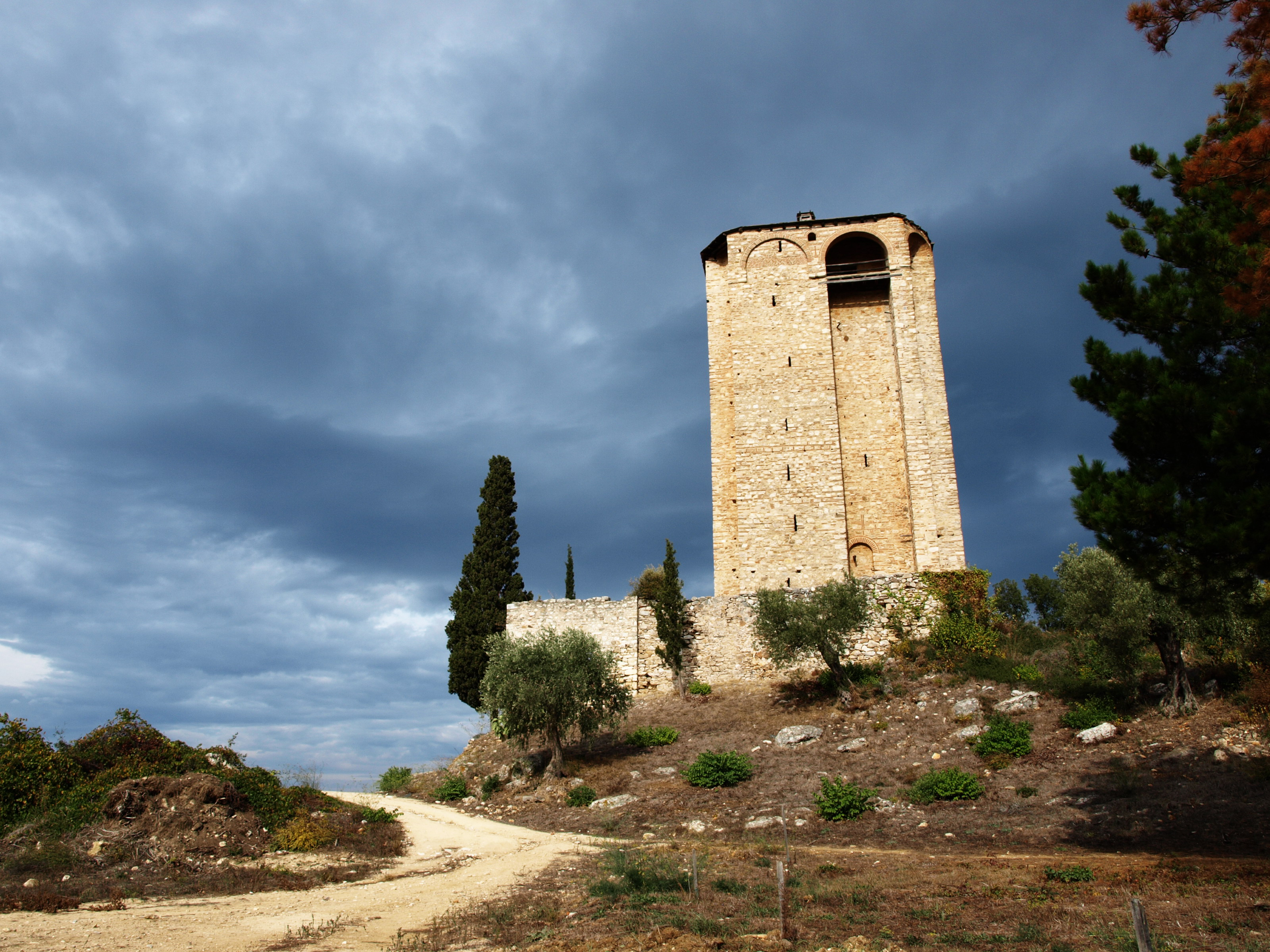
- Interactive map of the Milutin Tower кула Милутина kula Milutina; Πύργος του Μιλούτιν area

General information
- Architectural style: Late Byzantine
- Coordinates: 40°21′17″N 24°07′12″E
- Year built: 13th century
- Owner: Hilandar Monastery

Height
- Height: 45 meters

Milutin Tower (Serbian: кула Милутина, romanized: kula Milutina, Greek: Πύργος του Μιλούτιν) or Tower of the Horseman (Greek: Πύργος του Καβαλλαρέως) is a medieval defensive structure dedicated to Stefan Milutin, located in Serbian Orthodox Hilandar Monastery in Mount Athos, Greece.

== Location ==
The tower is located north of the monastery near its harbor on the northern coast of the peninsula.

== History ==
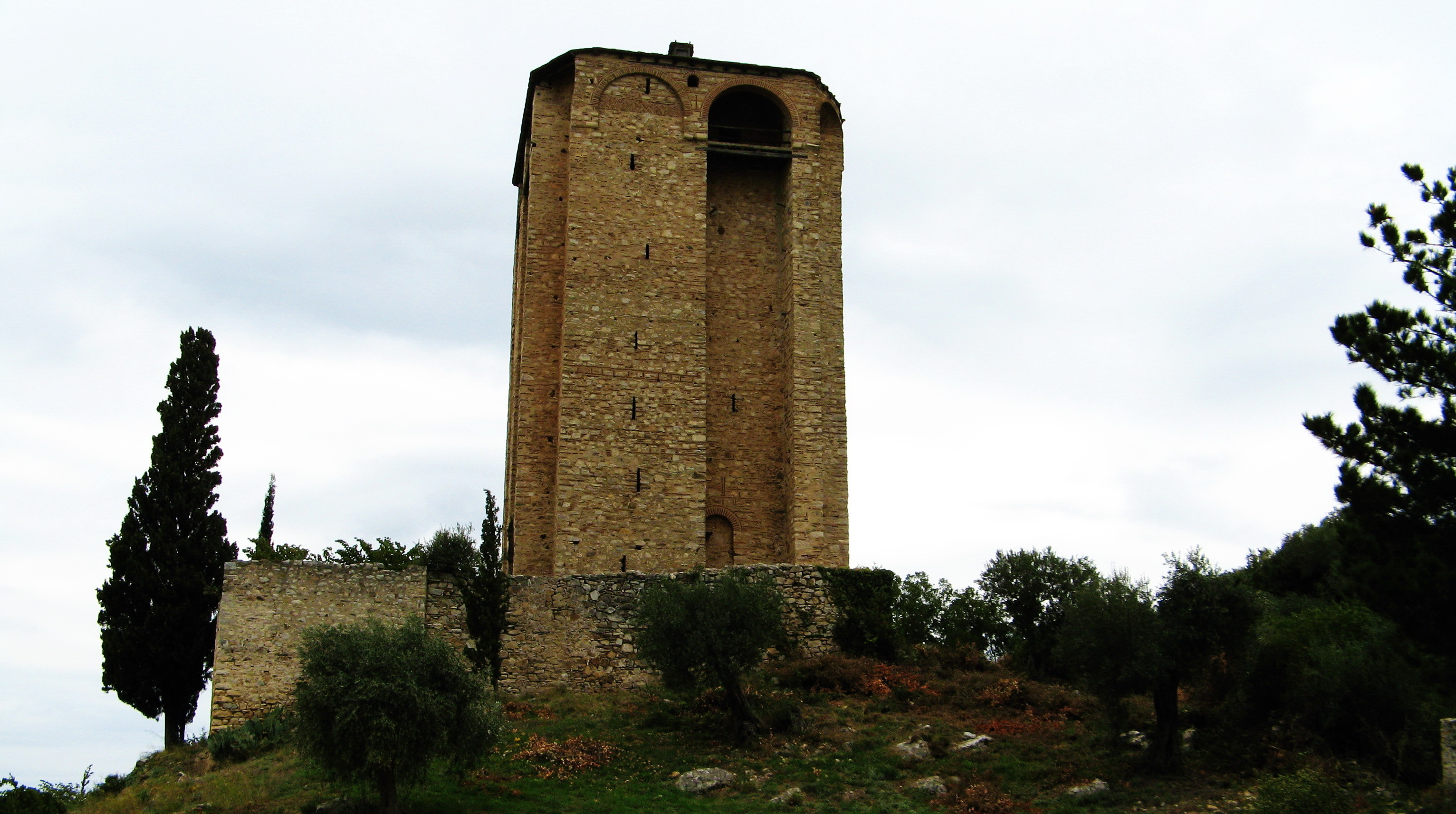
View

It was built around the middle of the 13th century. Already in 1198, the monastery and its properties were donated by Byzantine Emperor Alexios III Angelos to the Serbs as an eternal gift. The tower is named after Stefan Milutin, king of Serbia in the period 1281–1321, he added the top floor and roof in 1302.

== Description ==
The tower is 45m high and is a representative example of towers from the late Byzantine period, characterized by strongly protruding buttresses.

== See also ==
- Saint Sava Tower
- Saint George Tower
