= Urim Zenelaj =

Kosovan basketball player

No. 14 – Prizreni
- Position: Center
- League: Kosovo Superleague

Personal information
- Born: June 17, 1991 (age 35) Gjinoc, Suva Reka, SFR Yugoslavia
- Listed height: 6 ft 11 in (2.11 m)
- Listed weight: 297 lb (135 kg)

Career information
- NBA draft: 2013: undrafted
- Playing career: 2011–present

Career history
- 2011–2012: Bashkimi
- 2012–2013: RTV21
- 2013–2016: Ylli
- 2016–2017: Prishtina
- 2017–2018: Bashkimi
- 2018–present: Proton Cable Prizreni

Career highlights
- 2x Kosovo Superleague: (2017, 2018); Kosovo Cup winner (2017); Kosovo Supercup winner (2021); Top scorer of the Kosovo Superleague: (2016); Top rebounder of the Kosovo Superleague: (2016)

Urim Zenelaj (born June 17, 1991) is a Kosovan professional basketball player for Proton Cable Prizreni in the Kosovo Superleague.

== Youth career ==
Zenelaj played for the youth team of Vanoli Cremona from 2009 until 2010.

== Professional career ==
=== Bashkimi (2017–2018) ===
On September 12, 2017, Zenelaj signed for Bashkimi of the Kosovo Superleague and BIBL. He won the Superleague with Bashkimi.

=== Prizreni (2018–present) ===
On August 9, 2018, Zenelaj signed for Prizreni of the Kosovo Superleague. In 2021, he won the Kosovo Supercup.

== International career ==
Zenelaj was part of the Kosovan national team in the EuroBasket 2017 qualification.
