= Gjin =

Albanian given-name

Gjin is an Albanian male given name, clan, surname and onomastic element. As a name, it is usually held by Albanian Christians, as it is derived from the name of a saint. Although the identity of this saint is unclear, as both theologists and linguists disagree on the relation of Saint Gjin to Saint Gjon (the latter of which is considered to be Saint John).

== Origin ==
The origin of the name "Gjin" is unclear, except for the fact that he is considered a Christian saint by Albanians. The Catholic clergy consider Shën Gjin (Saint Gjin) to be the same saint as Shën Gjon (Saint John) but the Christians of the Central Albanian Shpati region (who are Orthodox)) revere the two as separate saints with two different saint days—21 May for Shën Gjon, but 24 June for Shën Gjin. Linguists also are unsure etymologically about the derivation of Gjin, especially, once again, whether it has the same source as Gjon. If Gjin does not have the same source as Gjon, it is difficult to find any Christian source of the name despite Gjin being considered a Christian saint among Albanians. Krahe and Lambertz have theorized that Gjin is in fact a Christianization of a pre-Christian Albanian figure, arguing in particular that the original name of the figure in ancient times was Gentius before it was mutated over time. If so, Gjin could be not the only Albanian Christian saint with a non-Christian origin, as another saint is also thought to be of pre-Christian origin: Shën Premti which shares the origin of Premte, the Albanian word for Friday, and is thought to share the origin of the ancient goddess Prende, the Albanian equivalent of Roman Venus, Norse Freyja and Greek Aphrodite but was identified by the Catholic Church with the martyr Saint Anne.

== As toponym ==
Albanians have historically coined place names using the names of saints, and Gjin is no exception. The following toponyms, among others, include Gjin as an onomastic element and is noted in the regions of Tirana, Elbasan and Mirdita.

- Shëngjin with variants Shnjin and Shën Gjini
- Gjinar
- Gjinovec
- Gjinoc

The given name transferring into the toponym is also seen in the form of Gjin Aleksi's Mosque.

== Persons with the name Gjin ==
Gjin is typically held as a given name by Albanian Christians, including these notable personalities:

- Gjin Bua Shpata, despot of Arta
- Gjin Progoni, Albanian prince
- Gjin Zenebishi, ruler of Epirus
- Gjini family
- Gjin Muzaka I
- Gjin Muzaka II

== See also ==
- Gjon
- Gjonaj
