= Branko (čelnik) =

Serbian nobleman

- čelnik
- Born: Kingdom of Serbia
- Died: after 1319

Branko (Serbian Cyrillic: Бранко; fl. 1306–19) was a Serbian nobleman with the title of čelnik, serving King Stefan Milutin (r. 1282–1321). He was among the witnesses mentioned in the charter issued to the Ratac Monastery by Milutin in 1306, alongside noblemen kaznac Miroslav and župan Vladislav, holding the title of čelnik. He is still in this position in an edict dated 1319. During the reign of Milutin, the title holder was entrusted with the security of property belonging to the Church from the aristocrats, so the holder appeared in the role of a judge or executor of the ruler's decisions, in disputes between the church and the nobility. At that time the title of čelnik was of a higher rank than župan and stavilac, but lower than kaznac and tepčija, with vojvoda being the supreme title. It is unclear if there was one or several with that title at the court at that time. He was preceded by Gradislav Vojšić and succeeded by Đuraš Ilijić.

== Sources ==
- Blagojević, Miloš (2001). Državna uprava u srpskim srednjovekovnim zemljama. Službeni list SRJ. ISBN 9788635504971.
- Ćirković, Sima; Mihaljčić, Rade (1999). Раде Михальчић (ed.). Лексикон српског средњег века Лексикон српског средњег века. Knowledge. ISBN 9788683233014.
- Srpska akademija nauka i umetnosti (1934). Glas. Vol. 161. Srpska akademija nauka i umetnosti.

Court offices
Preceded by Gradislav Vojšić	čelnik of King Stefan Milutin fl. 1306–19	Succeeded by Đuraš Ilijić
