= Gjini family =

Albanian medieval family

Gjini family was an Albanian noble family which was active in Albania Veneta in the 16th and 17th century who played a major role in social and military history of the southeastern Adriatic coast. The noble Mark Gjini belonged to the family.

== Name ==
According to Krahe and Lambertz, the noun Gjin may be an ancient Albanian name, a form of the anthroponym Gentius. The name Gjin is generally associated by Albanian Christians to the figure of a saint.

== Origin ==
The Gjini family is mentioned for the first time in 1216 in a letter sent from Pope Innocent III to Demetrius Gjini, the Prince of Albania.

== Background ==
The Ginni family, amongst families like the Bruti, Bruni, Krutaj, Skuraj, fled to Venetian Albania due to Ottoman pressure in the 16th century, although migrations had already begun in 1479, after the fall of Shkodër. The Gjini family produced lawyers who lived and worked in Zadar and Dalmatia and also members who served in the Venetian military during the Cretan War (1645-1669). M. Antonovic writes of a Clement Ginni, a possible ancestor of the Gjini family, who figures in Shkoder in 1330. The family reappears again only in 1536 in the will of Nikola Murthe, a migrant from Bar, who resides in Venice. A certain Baron Stjepan is said to have fled after Shkodra fell. In 1598, lawyers Nikola and Marko Ginni, sons of John Paul, are recorded in Zadar. Nikola was a captain in the Venetian military in 1622, where he did business with the head of Zadar, Simon Celadic. In 1593, Captain Marko Ginni was recorded as commander of a naval unit with soldiers commanded by Ulcinj migrant and Zadar resident Nikola Mesili (Melili) from Ulcinj. In 1595, two lawyers were recorded - John and Paul Ginni, the latter being a captain in 1595 when he married a noblewoman, Margaret, daughter of Bartol Ferr. In 1602, Paul was recorded as a commander of an Albanian unit. A soldier named Leka Fransi from the Bojana river was under Paul's command. In 1610, Ginni was to navigate a merchant ship from Venice to Split. In the summer, Ginni returned to Istria, where, along with Captain Petar Žarković, she commanded a detachment of 38 soldiers. The last mention of Paul Ginni is recorded in 1612, when he captured five Senj narrows.
