= Dhimitër Jonima =

Albanian feudal lord

Lord of Shufada
- Reign: 1377-1409
- Born: 14th century
- Died: 1409
- Noble family: Jonima family

Dhimitër Jonima (died 1409), also known as Demetrius, Demeter, Dimitri, Dimitrije or Dmitar Gonoma was an Albanian nobleman and feudal lord from the Jonima family who controlled territories along the trade route between Lezhë and Prizren, including the coastal port of Shufada at the mouth of the Mati river. Jonima is recorded as one of the leaders of the Albanian forces that fought in Prince Lazar's coalition against the Ottomans at the Battle of Kosovo in 1389.

In the years that followed, he alternated between Ottoman and Venetian vassalage, using these shifting allegiances to preserve his domains. He is last mentioned in 1409, the year in which he likely died. After his death, the Jonima family declined in power, with many of their former lands passing to the Kastrioti family; Ottoman cadastral records of the 15th and 16th centuries still referred to the region he once ruled over as the vilayet of Dhimitër Jonima.

== Independent rule and Ottoman vassalage ==
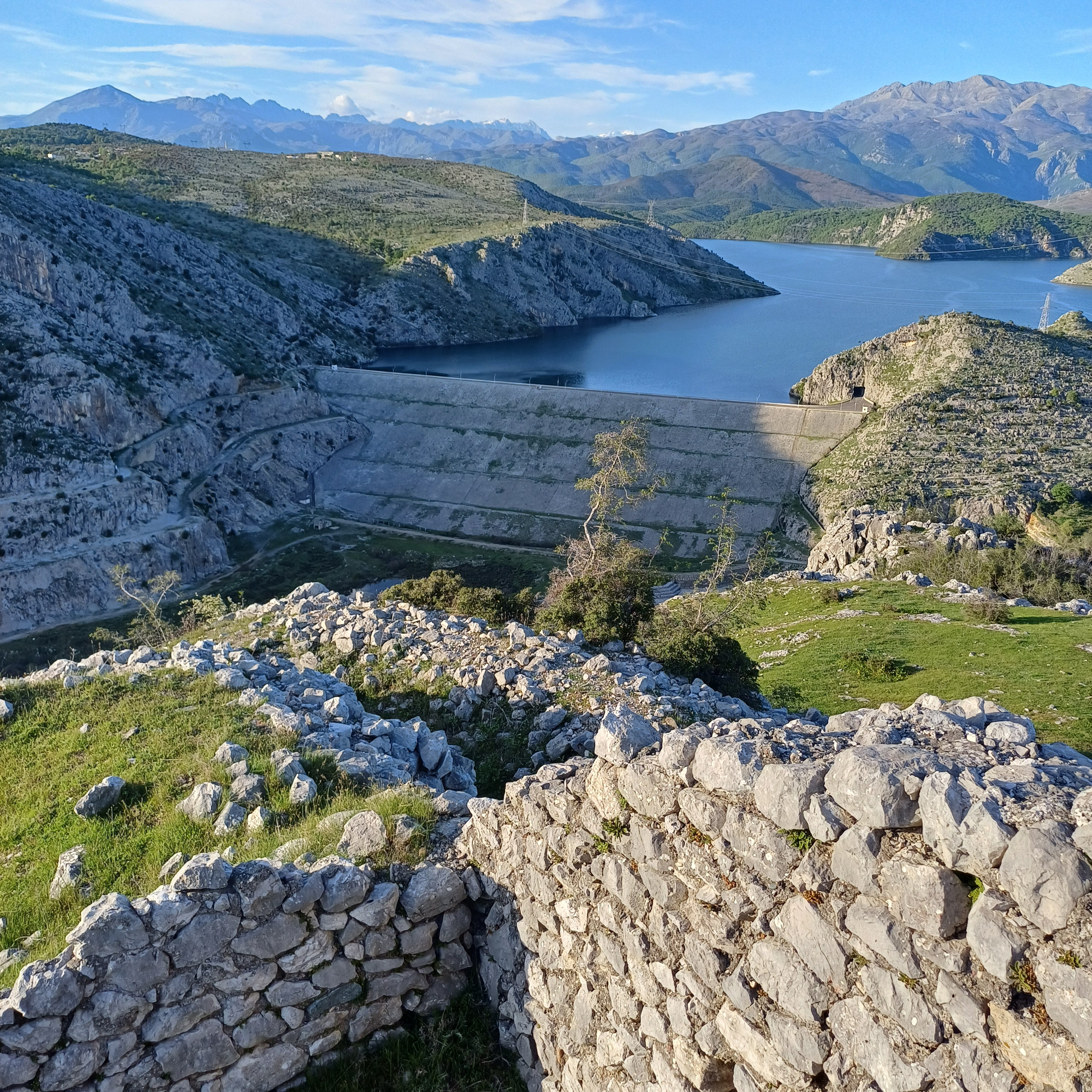
Ruins of Danjë

The Jonima family, who were centred at Danjë in the 1380's, had asserted their independence from the Balsha and became embroiled in a conflict with the Dukagjini family over the territory along both sides of the Drin. Dhimitër Jonima was the lord of the lands that encompassed part of the trade route from Lezhë to Prizren, holding possessions between Lezhë and Rrëshen. A number of scholars believe that Jonima participated at the Battle of Kosovo in 1389, together with a number of Albanian feudal lords and noblemen as one of the main leaders of the Albanian forces that fought in Lazar's Christian coalition against the Ottomans. Ottoman chronicles surrounding the battle considered Jonima to be one of the most important allies of the coalition.

After the Battle of Kosovo, the Jonima attempted to assert themselves in the territory between the Drin and Mati rivers. Historical records indicate that Dhimitër Jonima was independently ruling over territory between Lezhë and Rrëshen in 1394, and that his lands bordered those of his close relative Koja Zaharia to the north. He controlled the coastal trade port of Shufada at the mouth of the river Mat and an additional two castles, maintaining an army of 200 cavalrymen and more than 400 infantrymen. Aware of the influence of the Dukagjini family in the local region, Jonima established positive diplomatic relations with them. After obtaining the holdings of Shkodër, Drisht and Shirgj from George II Balsha in 1393, the Ottomans had begun strengthening their influence among the local Albanian lords, eventually winning over Dhimitër Jonima, who would arrange a meeting between the Ottomans and Marco Barbarigo, the ruler of Krujë. In return for aiding the Ottomans in their conquest of Shkodër, Dhimitër was granted control over the lands along the trade route between the coast and Prizren which had previously been under the control of the Dukagjini family. By eventually accepting Ottoman vassalage, Jonima was able to hold onto his strategic domains between Shkodër and Durrës.

Marco Barbarigo was initially a Venetian vassal, but after quarrelling with the Venetians, he broke off his connections with them and began to title himself as 'Lord of Krujë'. Whilst the Venetians attempted to bring Marco back under their control, the Venetian holdings of Durrës and its surroundings were constantly attacked by Ottoman forces which were led by the Ottoman commander of Shkodra and Dhimitër Jonima. They captured many prisoners in the surroundings of Durrës, which prompted the Venetians to place a bounty of 300 ducats on Jonima's head. Nonetheless, the Venetians acted cautiously towards Jonima so as to not jeopardize their relations with the Ottomans. On 28 September 1394, a meeting between Ottoman and Venetian officials was held in Durrës regarding the release of Venetian captives captured by Jonima and the Ottomans.

== Venetian vassalage ==
In July 1399, the castellan of Lezhë informed Venice of Jonima's desire to place himself under Venetian vassalage, stating that he was initially loyal to the Venetians before rebelling and attaching himself to the Ottomans for a month. However, he wished to return to the Venetians, and he was ready to provide information on the actions of the Turks. In return, he asked to become a Venetian citizen and for the right to take refuge in the lands of the Republic, if the need arose. The Venetians agreed on 21 July that year. In December 1399, the Ragusans sent a letter to the Ottoman governor of the Sanjak of Üsküp, Pasha Yiğit Bey, complaining of an attack on Ragusan traders carried out by Jonima. They also wrote to the Ottoman commander Sarhan, who was some sort of special emissary of Bayezid I to the Ragusans, and Feriz, the kephale of Zvečan, on the same day regarding the same matter.

The agreement between Jonima and the Venetians did not fully materialise, however, as a year later, the Venetians entered into negotiations with Koja Zaharia - the lord of Dagnum and Shati - and Jonima. By this time, Jonima had become a vassal of his close relative Koja Zaharia, who had allowed the Ottomans passage through his lands to attack the Venetians in Shkodër and Drisht. The two lords expressed their willingness to abandon their alliance with the Ottomans and to instead come to an agreement with the Republic, with their representative stating that they had been forced to join the Ottomans in order to hold onto their lands. Venice agreed to provide aid in troops and in the construction of fortifications in Danjë, along with other defensive measures in the lands of these two nobles. On 7 October 1400, Venetian officials in Shkodër promised to grant 500 ducats annually to Zaharia and 300 ducats annually to Jonima, plus lodging for each of their families. A few days later, on 12 October, the Venetians learned that the Ottoman Sultan Bayezid I was mustering his military forces against Timur, and that he had summoned Zaharia to join him as his vassal. As such, the alliance proposal was refused.

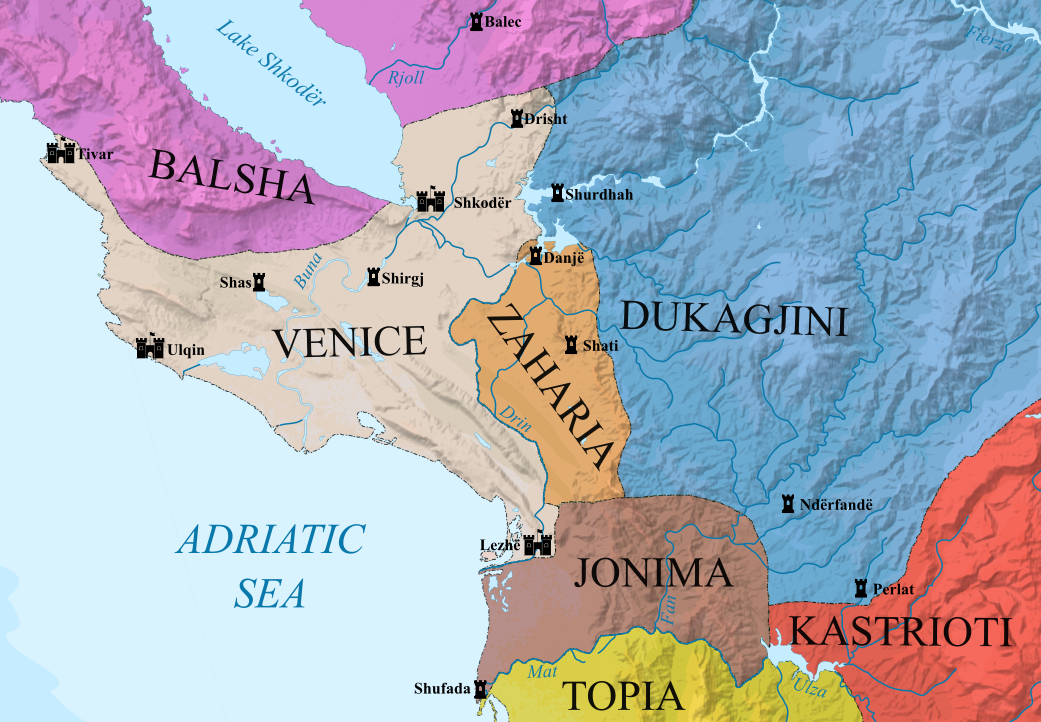
The domains of Dhimitër Jonima c. 1406, a year into the First Shkodra War.

In 1402, Jonima was amongst the many Albanian vassals of the Ottoman Empire who participated in the Battle of Ankara on the side of Sultan Bayezid. After the Ottoman defeat, he finally switched over to Venetian vassalage in December 1402, alongside a number of fellow Albanian nobles and lords. The submission of Zaharia and Jonima to the Venetians was facilitated by the Bishop of Sapë, who had interceded on their behalf. The two lords had every reason to act quickly, for as soon as the Ottomans withdrew from the region, the Balsha once again became an immediate threat. In the subsequent conflict between the Balsha III and the Venetians, Jonima and Zaharia continued to support the Venetians. On 5 May 1403, a pact made between Jonima and Venetian officials in Shkodër was confirmed, according to which Jonima would receive a supply of 200 Hyperpyron annually, along with cloth for two mantles and a suit of armour.

On 9 August 1407, Jonima submitted several requests to the Venetian Senate, the most notable of which was his proposal to coordinate and lead the Venetian army in the Republic's Albanian domains. The Venetians responded positively, acknowledging him as captain over both his own men and the Venetian soldiers on the condition that the troops retain their proper commander. The Republic nominally recognized Jonima as the commander of its entire army while leaving real authority to the Venetian captains, so the appointment therefore seemed more honorary than substantive. The honorary position given to him by the Venetians was no longer mentioned in an act dated to 27 August 1409, which provides details of an alliance concluded with Jonima. In exchange for an annual pension of 100 ducats, he was to place at Venice's disposal 200 cavalry and 400 infantry. Nevertheless, Jonima complained that the pension granted by the Republic was insufficient to allow him to live in a dignified manner, and requested an increase. Judging the sum to be adequate, the Venetians refused and declared that he should be satisfied with it.

== Death and legacy ==
Jonima is mentioned for a final time in historical records as the lord of Shufada in 1409, the year in which he must've died, ruling as an ally of the Venetians. After this, the Jonima family - who had already been greatly weakened by the end of the 14th century - eventually began to disappear from historical records, and possibly from a role in the area. The Jonima family did not hold onto the trade route between Lezhë and Prizren for long, as it soon passed into the hands of the Kastrioti family following Dhimitër's death, along with the Diocese of Arbanum. Other members of the Jonima family are later mentioned in the Shkodër region, but they never reached the fame or standing of Dhimitër Jonima. Even long after his death, upon the defeat of Gjon Kastrioti by Ottoman forces in 1431, the lands taken from him that had once belonged to the Jonima family were registered by the Ottomans as the vilayet of Dhimitër Jonima.

== See also ==
- Dagnum
- Jonima family
- Battle of Kosovo
