= Simon Gjoni =

Albanian composer (1923–1991)

- Born: October 28, 1925; Shkodër, Albania
- Died: October 31, 1991 (aged 66)
- Occupation: Composer
- Style: Classical, 20th century,
- Awards: Merited Artist

Simon Gjoni (Shkodër, 1925–1991) was an Albanian conductor, and composer of many popular pieces for piano and orchestra.

== Life ==
Simon Gjoni was born on October 28, 1925, in the city of Shkodër, Albania. He was educated in a rank and file urban family and graduated from the "Illyricum" High School of the city. Very soon he learned to play guitar, trombone, the piano and devoted himself with enthusiasm and passion to the art of music. In the years of his youth, he composed over 200 original songs, which were immediately sung in the city of Shkodër and were spread all over Albania, such as "Lule Bore" (Snowflower), "Syte e tu si drite" (English: Your Eyes Like Light), "Weaving girl". Ispecially the song "Lulebore" became really famous in Albania with a continuous success for over 60 years and is the first albanian song to achieve international success after it was performed in Russia, China, Vietnam, Chekoslovakia, Italy, USA etc.

He completed his studies over the years 1952–1958 in the Academy of Performing Arts in Prague (Czechoslovakia). During the years 1956-1958 in the city of Prague, he conducted: Franz Schubert's Rosamunde, Edvard Grieg's Peer Gynt, Jiří Antonín Benda's Pygmalion, K. Dittersdorff "Concert symphony for violin and contrabass", and Franz Liszt's Les Preludes.

In 1958 he returned to Tirana, where he started teaching at the Artistic Lyceum of Tirana and later in 1961 was among the first lecturers in Conservatory of Music in Tirana - Albania (today University of Arts), where he prepared many generations of musicians and artists, teaching the subjects of polyphony, orchestration, conducting, intonation and chamber music. In 1958, while being a teacher, he also worked for the National Theatre of Opera and Ballet of Albania, where he conducted many worldwide renowned works, which were interpreted for the first time in Albania. Such works were: Gaetano Donizetti's Don Pasquale, Ruggero Leoncavallo's Pagliacci, Gioachino Rossini's Barber of Seville, Tish Daija's Pranvera (English: The Spring), and two ballets (by Sergei Vasilenko's Lola, and Alexander Krein's Laurencia). Under his care and passion, he recorded many works of the Albanian composers: such as Çesk Zadeja, Pjetër Gaci, Nova, Tish Daija, Tonin Harapi, Pjetër Dungu, Grimci, Kono etc., and the music of some Albanian movies. In 1967, he conducted in China works by Albanian composers. Gjoni was also one of the founders of the Symphonic Orchestra of the Albanian Radio-Television. He worked persistently and with discipline for the establishment and growth of that orchestra.

Gjoni's activity as a composer has passed through all genres from the song, romance, cantata, suite, ballads, works for piano, clarinet, violin and major orchestral works such as: Symphonic dances, Symphonic poems, Symphonic Suite up to Symphony in Mib. Gjoni was a composer with a noble inspiration and pathos, whose music flows freely. Critic of music and musicologist George Leotsakos, in his letter dated 22 December 1991 characterized him as follows: "Simon Gjoni was an excellent composer, a predestined creator, with a profound aesthetic and musical culture, but above all with a marvelous human personality, with a golden heart in harmony with his refined culture."

Likewise, in the field of musical critique, he has left numerous theoretical works, related to the Albanian musical art and his work "The Instruments and the Art of Orchestration".

Composer Çesk Zadeja wrote the following on Gjoni on Drita, an Albanian cultural periodical, dated 1 December 1991, right after Gjoni's death:

The name of Simon Gjoni will remain ingraved in the pentagram of the Albanian music. The highest assessment for each creator is then when his work (his message) has its repercussion in the profundity of the time, increasing its values along as the time passes by. These features are attributed to the talented artist, composer, conductor, lecturer and musicologist Simon Gjoni.

== Discography ==
- Kenge, Albanian Piano Music, Vol. 1, Kirsten Johnson, piano, Guild GMCD 7257; includes Gjoni's Song of Bravery.
- Rapsodi, Albanian Piano Music, Vol. 2, Kirsten Johnson, piano, Guild GMCD 7300; includes Gjoni's Prelude in E minor and Toccata.
