= KB Prizreni =

Professional basketball club in Kosovo

Prizreni
- League: Kosovo Basketball Superleague
- Founded: 2015
- History: KB Kalaja ?–2018; KB Prizreni; 2018–2021; Ponte Prizreni; 2021–2023; Proton Cable Prizreni; 2023–present
- Arena: Sezai Surroi
- Capacity: 3,200
- Location: Prizren, Kosovo
- President: Zgjim Kryeziu
- Head coach: Arbnor Rifati
- Team captain: Urim Zenelaj
Home	Away

KB Prizreni, formerly KB Kalaja and Ponte Prizreni, also known as Proton Cable Prizreni due to sponsorship reason, is a professional basketball club based in Prizren, Kosovo. The club currently plays in the Kosovo Basketball Superleague.

The 2018–19 season was the club's first season in the Kosovo Superleague after year they got promoted. In 2021, the team won its first trophy when it won the Kosovo Supercup.

== Home arena ==
The club currently plays in the sport center Sezai Surroi, in the center of Prizren, with a capacity for around 3,200 spectators.

== Honours ==
Kosovo Supercup

- Winners (1): 2021

== Players ==
=== 2022–2023 roster ===
Ponte Prizreni roster
Players
Coaches

Pos.	No.	Nat.	Name	Ht.	Wt.	Age
PG	11	(United States)	Grant, Adam	1.85 m (6 ft 1 in)	82 kg (181 lb)	29 – 9 February 1997
PG	7	(United States)	Burke, Jr., Dachon	1.93 m (6 ft 4 in)	82 kg (181 lb)	28 – 25 November 1997
G	3	(United States)	Washington, Leondre	1.83 m (6 ft 0 in)	77 kg (170 lb)	28 – 21 January 1998
G	9	(Kosovo)	Morina, Leurit	1.83 m (6 ft 0 in)	75 kg (165 lb)	22 – 25 June 2003
SG	1	(United States)	Arnold, Wayne	1.93 m (6 ft 4 in)
SF	10	(Kosovo)	Rexhepi, Donat	1.96 m (6 ft 5 in)	80 kg (176 lb)	24 – 11 March 2002
SF	5	(Kosovo)	Ismaili, Meriton	1.94 m (6 ft 4 in)	80 kg (176 lb)	25 – 3 April 2000
F	12	(Kosovo)	Ajazaj, Qendrim (C)	1.91 m (6 ft 3 in)	90 kg (198 lb)
F	22	(Kosovo)	Matoshi, Blendi	1.96 m (6 ft 5 in)	90 kg (198 lb)	32 – 27 January 1994
F	0	(Kosovo)	Qovanaj, Endrit	1.96 m (6 ft 5 in)
PF	21	(Kosovo)	Memaj, Besmir	2.02 m (6 ft 8 in)
PF		(United States)	Wiggins, Jr, Alan	2.03 m (6 ft 8 in)	102 kg (225 lb)	41 – 19 June 1984
C	14	(Kosovo)	Zenelaj, Urim	2.13 m (7 ft 0 in)	136 kg (300 lb)	34 – 17 July 1991

Head coach

- (Kosovo) Edin Kerveshi

Assistant coach

Legend

- (C) Team captain

=== Depth chart ===
Pos.	Starting 5	Bench 1	Bench 2
C	Urim Zenelaj	Alan Wiggins, Jr.	Besmir Memaj
PF	Muhamedali Janjeva	Blendi Matoshi	Endrit Qovanaj
SF	Meriton Ismaili	Qendrim Ajazaj	Donat Rexhepi
SG	Wayne Arnold	Leondre Washington	Leurit Morina
PG	Adam Grant	Dachon Burke, Jr.

== Coaching history ==
Coach	Years active
(Kosovo) Arbnor Rifati	2016–2022
(Kosovo) Edin Kërveshi	2022–2023
(Turkey) Turgay Bostanci	2023–2024
(North Macedonia) Igor Mihajlovski	2024
(Kosovo) Rigon Hasi	2024
(Kosovo) Arbnor Rifati	2024–present

== Notable players ==
Note: Flags indicate national team eligibility at FIBA-sanctioned events. Players may hold other non-FIBA nationalities not displayed.

Criteria

To appear in this section a player must have either:

- Set a club record or won an individual award while at the club
- Played at least one official international match for their national team at any time
- Played at least one official NBA match at any time.

- (Kosovo) Arti Hajdari
- (Kosovo) Meriton Ismaili
- (Kosovo) Musab Malaj
- (Kosovo) Urim Zenelaj
- (Kosovo) (United States) Divine Myles
- (United States) Xavier Cannefax
- (United States) Kwame Vaughn
