= Gjinoc =

Gjinoc: Gjinoc (Albanian); Ђиновце/Đinovce (Serbian)
- Village
- Location within Kosovo
- Coordinates: 42.318482°N 20.818370°E
- Location: Kosovo
- District: Prizren
- Municipality: Suharekë
- Elevation: 438 m (1,437 ft)

Population (2024)
  - Total: 1,874
- Time zone: UTC+1 (CET)
  - Summer (DST): UTC+2 (CEST)

Gjinoc (Albanian: Gjinoc/Gjinaj, Serbian Cyrillic: Ђиновце/Đinovce) is a village in Suharekë municipality, Kosovo.

== Etymology ==
The name of the village derives from the Albanian name Gjin.

== History ==
The village was mentioned in the year 1348 together with 8 other Albanian villages in the area. The village was also recorded in the Ottoman register of 1591 as 'Gjinofic'.

== Notable people ==
- Albin Berisha, Kosovan footballer
- Urim Zenelaj, Kosovan basketball player
