= Jonima family =

Noble family from Albania

Jonima Gjonima
- Noble family Tribe
- Country: Medieval Albania
- Current region: Northern and Central Albania (Shkodër, Lezhë, Mat, Dagnum, Shufada)
- Founded: 13th century
- Titles: Sebastos; Župan; Comes; Lord
- Members: Vladislav Jonima; Dhimitër Jonima; Fior Jonima
- Connected families: Zaharia

The Jonima (Albanian: Gjonima) were a noble Albanian family and fis active between the 13th and 15th centuries CE in northern and central Albania. First attested to in the early 13th century as vassals of the Principality of Arbanon, members of the family later appear as signatories to Angevin and Ragusan agreements and as officials in the service of the Kingdom of Serbia. By the late 14th century, the Jonima had established themselves around the Mat valley, controlling parts of the trade route between Lezhë and Prizren as well as the important coastal port of Shufada.

Under Dhimitër Jonima, the family is believed to have participated in the Battle of Kosovo in 1389 as part of Prince Lazar's Christian coalition against the Ottomans. In the 1390s they accepted Ottoman vassalage but also negotiated intermittently with Venice. After the Ottoman defeat at the Battle of Ankara in 1402, Dhimitër and other Albanian lords switched allegiance to Venice, and he remained a Venetian vassal and ally until his death in 1409.

The family's territories were later absorbed by the Kastrioti family but survived as a regional designation under Ottoman rule. The vilayet of Dhimitër Jonima, recorded in the defters of 1467 and 1583 (later renamed Pjetër Jonima), stretched along the Mat river from Lezhë to Rubik. Other members of the family are attested to in Venetian and Ottoman records well into the 16th century, though never again achieving the prominence of their predecessors.

== Name and toponomy ==
Linguist Arben Ndreca has proposed that the family's name is derived from a compounding of the name Jon/Gjon (the Albanian form of the given name John) and the word Ma[dh] (meaning 'big, great' in Albanian); together, their surname means Gjon i Madh (John the Great/Big John). The name of the family appears in multiple forms in historical sources, such as Gonoma, Guonimi, Gjonëmi, Ghionoma, Giolma, Gionima, Gonome, Jonema, Jonoma etc. The term occurs widely in toponymy, albeit in considerably deformed versions, such as Quku i Gjormit of Xhani, Gjormi of Rrjolli, Brija e Gjormit of Gruemirë, Gjormi of Grizha to the north of Shkodër, Gjormi in Elbasan and Kodra e Gjormakvet in Dajçi of Zadrima. The form Gjonëmi can be found in Lurja and Luma, and Gjunumi is found near Dukat, which itself is nearby Vlorë. Marin Barleti mentions Sylva Jonimorum in Kurbini, and Gjon Muzaka in 1510 mentions Guonyms in Kurbini; Gionami, Gionemi or Gionimi are also recorded in 1640 and 1671, also in Kurbini. These have been identified with the modern Gjolmi of Kurbini.

== History ==
=== 13th-14th centuries ===
The Jonima first appear in historical sources at the beginning of the 13th century as vassals of Dhimitër Progoni, Panhypersebastos and Archon (ruler) of the Principality of Arbër, as attested to by an agreement between Progoni and the Ragusans. In this agreement, in which one of the signatories was a noble by the name of Jonima, Ragusan traders were exempted from tolls and guaranteed free movement and security within Progoni's lands. At the end of the 13th century, two powerful families - or branches of the same family - bearing the Jonima surname were attested to in the regions of Durrës and Shkodër. One member of the Jonima family held the title of Sebastos and had signed an agreement in 1274 with Charles I of Anjou, the King of Sicily, alongside several other Albanian nobles.

Another member of the family, Vladislav Jonima, is mentioned in 1306 in the service of Stephen Uroš II Milutin of Serbia with the title of župan. Vladislav Jonima later held the title of Count of Dioclea and of coastal Albania. Around 1318, the Kingdom of Serbia, then under Stefan Milutin, launched a new offensive on the Kingdom of Albania, resulting in the formation of an anti-Serb coalition under papal coordination, in which the Albanians played an important role. In the spring of 1319, several Albanian nobles - including the Jonima family — informed Pope John XXII through Andreas, the Bishop of Krujë, that they were ready resist the Serbian king. They also promised to abandon the Orthodox rite and embrace Catholicism, thereby separating themselves ecclesiastically from the Serbs. As a result of this organized resistance, the Serbs were prevented from establishing long-standing control over Durrës and its region, where the Angevins continued to exercise an increasingly weakened sovereignty.

After the death of Balsha II at the Battle of Savra in 1385, the Balsha family began to lose their Albanian territories south of Zeta. The Jonima, who were centred at Dagnum in the 1380's, asserted their independence from the Balsha and ruled over their estates between Durrës and the Drin. They became embroiled in a conflict over the territory along both sides of the river Drin with the Dukagjini family, who had also seceded from the Balsha.

Around this time, Dhimitër Jonima was the lord of the lands that encompassed part of the trade route from Lezhë to Prizren, holding possessions between Lezhë and Rrëshen. Together with a number of fellow Albanian feudal lords and noblemen, he is believed by numerous scholars to have participated at the Battle of Kosovo in 1389 as one of the main leaders of the Albanian forces that fought in Lazar's Christian coalition against the Ottomans. Ottoman chronicles surrounding the battle considered Jonima to be one of the most important allies of the coalition. After the Battle of Kosovo, the Jonima attempted to assert themselves in the territory between the Drin and Mati rivers. In 1394, historical records indicate that Dhimitër Jonima was independently ruling over territory between Lezhë and Rrëshen that bordered the lands of Koja Zaharia to the north. Dhimitër controlled the coastal trade port of Shufada at the mouth of the Mati river and an additional two castles, maintaining an army of 200 cavalrymen and more than 400 infantrymen. Aware of the influence of the Dukagjini family in the local region, Dhimitër established positive diplomatic relations with them. Dhimitër Jonima and Koja Zaharia were close relatives.

After obtaining the holdings of Shkodër, Drisht and Shirgj from George II Balsha in 1393, the Ottomans had begun strengthening their influence among the local Albanian lords, eventually winning over Dhimitër Jonima, who would arrange a meeting between the Ottomans and Marco Barbarigo, the ruler of Krujë. In return for aiding the Ottomans in their conquest of Shkodër, Dhimitër was granted control over the lands along the trade route between the coast and Prizren which had previously been under the control of the Dukagjini family. By eventually accepting Ottoman vassalage, the Jonimas were able to hold onto their strategic domains between Shkodër and Durrës. Around this time the Jonimas participated in Ottoman raids on Venetian holdings in Durrës and its surroundings in which they captured many prisoners, and this prompted the Venetians to place a bounty of 300 ducats on Dhimitër's head. Nonetheless, the Venetians acted cautiously towards the Jonimas so as to not jeopardize their relations with the Ottomans. On 28 September 1394, a meeting between Ottoman and Venetian officials was held in Durrës regarding the release of Venetian captives captured by the Jonimas and the Ottomans.

In July 1399, the Venetian castellan of Lezhë informed the Republic of Dhimitër's desire to place himself under Venetian vassalage, stating that he was ready to provide information on the actions of the Ottomans. In return, Dhimitër asked to become a Venetian citizen and for the right to take refuge in the lands of the Republic, if the need arose. The Venetians agreed on 21 July of that year, although the agreement did not fully materialise. In December 1399, the Ragusans sent a letter to the Ottoman governor of the Sanjak of Üsküp, Pasha Yiğit Bey, complaining of an attack on Ragusan traders carried out by the Jonimas.

=== 15th-16th centuries ===
Under Dhimitër, the Jonimas became vassals of Koja Zaharia, the lord of Shati, who had allowed the Ottomans passage through his lands to attack the Venetians in Shkodër and Drisht. The Venetians entered into negotiations with Zaharia and his new vassal, who were willing to abandon their alliance with the Ottomans and come to an agreement with the Republic. The Venetians agreed to provide aid in the form of troops and in the construction of defensive measures in the lands of the two noble families, and on 7 October 1400, Venetian officials in Shkodër promised to grant 500 ducats annually to Zaharia and 300 ducats annually to Dhimitër, plus lodging for each of their families. A few days later, on 12 October, the Venetians learned that the Ottoman Sultan Bayezid I was mustering his military forces against Timur, and that he had summoned Zaharia to join him as his vassal. As such, the alliance proposal was refused.

In 1402, the Jonimas - led by Dhimitër - participated in the Battle of Ankara alongside many Albanian lords as vassals of Bayezid. Bayezid was defeated, and many Albanian lords and nobles - including the Jonimas - abandoned the Ottomans and entered into Venetian vassalage. The submission of the Jonimas and the Zaharias to the Venetians was facilitated by the Bishop of Sapë, who had interceded on their behalf. The two families had every reason to act quickly, for as soon as the Ottomans withdrew from the region, the Balsha family had once again became an immediate threat. In the subsequent conflict between the Ottoman vassal Balša III and the Venetians, the Jonimas and Zaharias continued to support the Venetians. On 5 May 1403, a pact made between Dhimitër Jonima and Venetian officials in Shkodër was confirmed, according to which Dhimitër would receive a supply of 200 Hyperpyron annually, along with cloth for two mantles and a suit of armour.

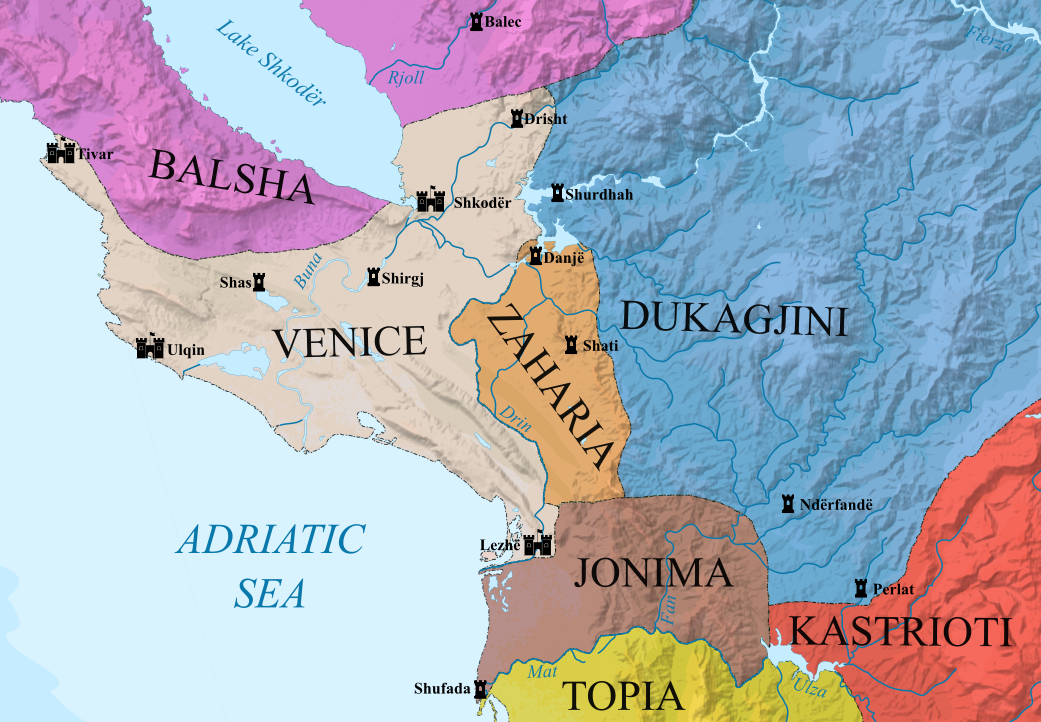
The domains of Dhimitër Jonima c. 1406, a year into the First Shkodra War.

After submitting a number of requests to the Venetians on 9 August 1407, Dhimitër was acknowledged as captain over both his own men and the Venetian soldiers in Venetian Albania on the condition that the troops retain their proper commander. The Republic nominally recognized Dhimitër as the commander of its entire army while leaving real authority to the Venetian captains, so the appointment seemed to be more honorary than substantive. However, the honorary position given to him by the Venetians was no longer mentioned in an act dated to 27 August 1409, which provides details of an alliance concluded with the Jonimas. In exchange for an annual pension of 100 ducats, Dhimitër was to place at Venice's disposal 200 cavalry and 400 infantry. Dhimitër is mentioned for a final time in historical records as the lord of Shufada in 1409, the year in which he must've died, ruling as an ally of the Venetians.

After Dhimitër's death, the Jonima family - who had already been greatly weakened by the end of the 14th century - eventually began to disappear from historical records, and possibly from a notable role in the area. The Jonimas did not hold onto the trade route between Lezhë and Prizren for long, as it soon passed into the hands of the Kastrioti family following Dhimitër's death, along with the Diocese of Arbanum that was situated within their territories. The coastal town of Shufada itself would come under the control of Gjon Kastrioti soon after, certainly by 1428, and Kastrioti continued to cooperate with those members of the Jonima family who remained in the area of Lezhë, since most of the Jonima family lived in the region of Shkodër by this time.

In 1410, the Venetians granted confiscated land to a father and son named Vito and Stefan Jonima. Various members of the Jonima family continued to appear in the region of Shkodra between 1416 and 1417, such as an individual by the name of Flor Jonima who lived in the city of Shkodra itself in 1417. In that same year, a man by the name of Gjon - the son of the aforementioned Stefan Jonima - received several vineyards in Koplik that had been taken from a rebel by the name of Nikola Hoti. Two individuals by the name of Vito and Stefan Jonima were mentioned by historical sources yet again in 1447 and 1468 respectively. A former rebel by the name of Stefan Jonima petitioned the Venetian Senate to grant him his former possessions, and in 1445, he obtained the village of Kurtes. A Zorzi and Piero, who were recorded in 1542, were stratiots stemming from the Jonima family. In 1569, a Joannes Dionami figure was part of the ecclesiastical clergy of Lezha. Domenik Jonima, a local leader from the Mati region, attended an assembly of Albanian leaders and Venetians at the monastery of Saint Mary in Mat on 7 November 1594. The purpose of the assembly was to discuss and plan the liberation of Albania from Ottoman control, but this Albanian liberation movement was eventually thwarted by the Venetians by the end of 1595.

Upon the defeat of Gjon Kastrioti by Ottoman forces in 1431, the lands taken from him that had once belonged to the Jonima family were registered by the Ottomans as the vilayet of Dhimitër Jonima. The vilayet of Dhimitër Jonima appears for the first time in Ottoman sources during the 1430's, and the Ottoman defter (cadastral register) of 1467 recorded 22 villages in the vilayet of Dhimitër Jonima, which was one of the regions that made up the Diocese of Arbanum. Those villages were Vishtuli, Solomoni, Kapruli, Bërzana, Gajpi (Gajushi), Bukati, Kurjasuti, Fiku, Matarisi, Skandani, Napëzi, Dushku, Dolaka, Skopëdhi (Shkopeti), Lurzi, Kolashi, Koshtanija, Lindiza, Zojmeni Zejmeniç, Shukalza, Shillazi and Pëdhana (Pllana). In the Ottoman defter of 1583, the former vilayet of Dhimitër Jonima was registered as the nahiyah of Pjetër Jonima. This nahiyah had a total of 25 villages and abandoned settlements - Gajeti, Lopesi, Zyjmi (Zejmeni), Pezhana, Fiku, Tërkeshi, Shtepani, Darda, Mantija, Kashtina, Brzana, Kukula, Shalësi, Kondani, Korvesuti, Mërqina, Lezha, Matresi, Sulimoni, Sheja, Skopeti, Kaprula, Lufa, Murtkina and Ishulli. As indicated by the village names recorded in the defters of 1467 and 1583, the territory of Dhimitër (Pjetër) Jonima stretched along the northern bank of the Mat river, from Lezha to Rubik. Its inclusion in the kaza of Krujë demonstrates its close historical ties with the southern area of Kurbin.

The village of Gjonimi (modern-day Gjonëm, Kurbin) appears in the Ottoman defter of 1467 as a hass-ı mir-liva and derbendci settlement in the vilayet of Akçahisar with six households, represented by: Ozgyr Primiqyri, Dhuka Lugras, Pal Gjonima, Gjergj Gjonima, Peter Koka, and Gjergj Gjonima. In 1583, the village is recorded as part of the nahiyah of Kurbini.

== Members ==
- Vladislav Jonima
- Dhimitër Jonima
- Fior Jonima
