= Hilandar Research Library =

Research library at Ohio State University

Coordinates: 40.015216°N 83.036406°W

The Hilandar Research Library (HRL), located in the Thompson Library on the campus of Ohio State University, has the largest collection of medieval Slavic manuscripts on microform in the world.

== Hilandar Research Library Collection ==
The collection is composed of microform material from more than 100 different private, museum, and library collections in dozens of countries. It includes many Cyrillic manuscripts on microform, the majority from various monasteries on Mount Athos, Greece, including the entire Slavic collection of the Hilandar Monastery. The library also contains a 100,000 volume reference collection. The entire collection can be viewed in the Jack and Jan Creighton Special Collections Reading Room (Thompson Library). The HRL shares its space with the Resource Center for Medieval Slavic Studies (RCMSS). Both the Hilandar Library and the Resource Center for Medieval Slavic Studies were developed as an outgrowth of the original Hilandar Research Project, which ran from 1969 to 1982.

== Resource Center for Medieval Slavic Studies ==
Founded in 1984, the Resource Center for Medieval Slavic Studies (RCMSS) is an independent center of the Ohio State University College of Humanities and is dedicated to the promotion of medieval Slavic studies. The Resource Center for Medieval Slavic Studies fosters and supports research and collaboration in medieval Slavic languages, linguistics, history, and culture.

== See also ==
- Slavistics
- Slavic languages
- Cyrillic Alphabet
- Cyrillic script
