= Gjon Simoni =

Albanian composer (1936–1999)

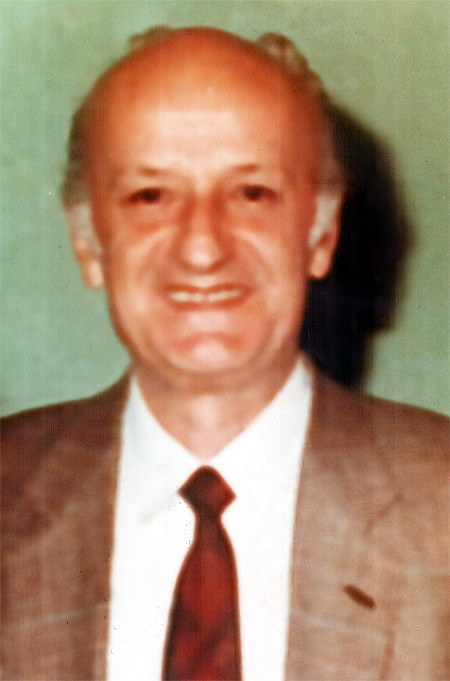
Gjon Simoni

Gjon Simoni (8 February 1936 – 2 July 1999) was an Albanian musicologist and composer.

== Life ==
Simoni was born in Shkodër on 8 February 1936, into an Albanian family of long cultural tradition. He was active in his city's musical life very early. In 1966 he graduated in composition and history of music from the Tirana State Conservatory. In 1966–1969, he was head of the Music Section in Gjirokastër. In 1969–1980, he was an editor of musical programs at the Albanian Radio-Television.

In 1980, he was head of the Composition Chair at the Academy of Arts in Tirana. In 1993–1994, he worked as a teacher of music at the School of Music in Karditsa, Greece. In 1996–1997, he was dean of the Faculty of Music at the Academy of Arts in Tirana. In 1997, he was teacher of orchestration at the Academy of Arts. He was holder of various prizes and titles.

His musical works are being played at various musical events in Albania and abroad. He also dealt with problems of music in the Albanian media and at various conferences and seminars.

Simoni died in Tirana on 2 July 1999.

== Selection of musical works ==
=== Chamber music ===
- Three pieces for clarinet quartets (1995)
- Duet for viola and bass viol (1995)
- Suite of Korca songs for string quartet (1996)

=== Orchestral music ===
- Suite for string orchestra on motifs from the opera Mrika of Prenk Jakova (1981)
- "Migjeniana" string suite (1984)
- Suite from "the Sons of the New Age" ballet (1985)
- Three motifs from "Migjenian" cycle (1986)
- "Seasons of Waves," concerto for orchestra (1988)
- "Little Symphony for strings" (1990)
- Choral and fugue for string orchestra (1994)
- Concerto for piano and orchestra in three times (1986)
- "Migjeniana," ballet (staged first posthumously at the National Theater of Opera and Ballet in 2007)
- Greek fantasia for piano and orchestra (1994)
- Suite for strings (1996)
- Requiem for Mother Teresa (1998)

=== Instrumental music ===
- Variations for flute and orchestra on a popular theme (1975)
- Romance for flute and orchestra (1976)
- Festive dance for piano and orchestra (1976)
- Concerto for violin and orchestra in three times (1988–1989)
- Quartet for fagotto (1999), played posthumously on 3 July 1999.

=== Vocal works ===
- "Blossom, flowers, blossom," song on a folk motif (1997)
- Songs on folk motifs of southern Albania (1997)
- Two songs on folk motifs (1997)
- "Flowered Doublet," song on folk motif (1993)
- "De Profundis," cantata in three times for soloist, choir and symphonic orchestra
- "Ave Maria" (1991)
- Three variations on folk motifs for soloist and orchestra
- "Stabat Mater" for soloist and a cappella choir (1995)
- "Snowflower," song on folk motif
- "It Was My Fate," song on folk motif

=== Film music ===
Children's films

- "Squirrel Helps Chum," animated cartoon (1979)
- "Shoeshine" (1979)
- "Bear Breaks New Land" (1979)
- "Bear Seeks Father" (1981)
- "Little Rabbit" (1982
- "Gent's Hours," animated cartoon (1986)
- "Newest of Cities" (1974)

Feature films

- "Long Year" (1987)
- "Return of Dead Army" (1989)
- "Boys and Girls" (1990)
- "Appassionata" (1984)
- "Teenagers" (1990)

During 1986–1999, he processed about 150 folk songs, orchestrated 300 songs, and made 50 arrangements of vocal and instrumental works of Albanian and world music. Among others, he orchestrated composer Pjetër Gaci's operas "Our Earth" and "Through Mist."

=== Publications ===
- "Orchestration" for students of the Academy of Arts
- Textbook for high schools
- "Symphony of a Life," a biography of Cardinal Mikel Koliqi, published posthumously, Naples, Italy
