= Vladislav Jonima =

Albanian nobleman

- Count (župan, comes) of Dioclea and coastal Albania
- Died: after 1319
- Noble family: Jonima
- Occupation: Nobility; Vassal of Serbia (fl. 1303–06); Ally of Philip I, Prince of Taranto (fl. 1319)

Vladislav Jonima (fl. 1303–19) was an Albanian nobleman from the Jonima family who initially served as a župan under Serbian King Stefan Milutin. He was last mentioned in papal correspondence as the Count of Dioclea and Maritime Albania in 1319, and was one of several Albanian noblemen who joined an Angevin–Albanian alliance against King Milutin that was ultimately unsuccessful.

== Life ==
Croatian historian Milan Šufflay believed Vladislav to be the descendant of sevast Jonima, mentioned in Angevin sources dating to 1274. In 1303, Vladislav had lived in the court of Serbian King Stefan Milutin. In 1306, he held the title of župan in the service of King Stefan Milutin; he was among the witnesses mentioned in a charter issued to Ratac by Milutin in 1306. His rank in the hierarchy of the Serbian Kingdom was below the rank of kaznac Miroslav and čelnik Branko.

Vladislav was sent the third letter in a series of three written by Pope John XXII in 1319 that were directed to Albanian nobles and lords in an attempt to rally them against King Milutin. He was addressed as the Count of Dioclea and Maritime Albania. The letters were written in support of the planned crusade against the Kingdom of Serbia, suggesting that the Albanian nobles were to play an important role in the crusade. In his letters, Pope John XXII addressed the Albanian nobles as dilecti filii, a term which was not used to address non-Catholics. Therefore, these Albanian lords - including Vladislav - are believed to have been Catholic. Vladislav held possessions that were under the direct influence of Helen, the Catholic French queen consort of Serbian King Stefan Uroš I and mother of the next two kings. She intensified and propagated the spread of Catholicism in these regions and regularly corresponded with the papacy, and the Catholic element that had strengthened during her lifetime continued to have an effect after her death.

Other scholars, however, believe that Vladislav belonged to the Serbian Orthodox rite, and that Albanians of both the Byzantine Orthodox (such as the Muzaka family) and Serbian Orthodox rites were joining a broader alliance of Albanian noblemen and rebels who aimed to resist Serbia. Whatever the case, Philip of Taranto eventually succeeded in uniting many lords in the Kingdom of Albania against Serbia, including the Arianiti family, the Mataranga family, the Muzaka family, and the Blinishti family, as well as Vladislav Jonima himself. King Stefan Milutin eventually thwarted these efforts, and the Serbs continued to hold northern Albania. Swiss historian Oliver Schmitt regards Vladislav's name and position in a Slavic-dominated state as a sign of close relations between the two ethnic groups in the region.

== Annotations ==
1. In Latin, his name is given as Bladislao Gonome. In Serbian sources he is known as župan Vladislav (жупан Владислав). His given name, Vladislav, is Slavic. Konstantin Jireček also used Vladislav Gonoma.

== Sources ==
- Šufflay, Milan (1924). "Chapter". Arhiv Za Arbanasku Starinu, Jezik I Etnologiju. 2. Albanološki institut u Prištini: 202. "... s Blinistima, ali tek privremeno, iscezava i obitelj J о n i m a (Gonoma, Guonimi) u osobi Vladislava Jonime, zu* pana Duklje i primorske Albanije (1319 papinska bula: dilecto filio Bladislao Gonome, Dioclee et Maritime Albanie comiti), koji g. 1303 zivi na dvoru srpskog kralja, a bez dvojbe je potomak "sevasta Jonime", sto ga spominje anzuvinska isprava od g. 1274. Kako se iz naslova papinske bule vidi, župan Vladislav bio je katolik. Obitelj Jonima javlja se ponovno početkom 15 vijeka oko gradića Danja i Šatija na Drinu, ravnopravna s ondje* šnjim Zaharijama (1365 Nikola Zaharija kaštelan Budve) i ..."
- Blagojević, Miloš (2001). Državna uprava u srpskim srednjovekovnim zemljama (in Serbian). Belgrade: Službeni list SRJ. p. 210. ISBN 9788635504971. "Када је краљ Милутин издао повељу манастиру Богородице Ратачке, међу присутнима је било и црквених и световних достојанственика. Од световних лица помињу се: казнац Мирослав, челник Бранко и жупан Владислав (Јонима) ... За челника Бранка може се са знатном сигурношћу рећи да је... по рангу био нижи од казнаца Мирослава а виши од жупана Владислава ..."
- Francuski Institut (1941), Annales, p. 167, "Philippe de Tarente, qui avait pris le titre d'empereur latin, réussit à rallier de nombreux seigneurs albanais (barones regni Albanie) du sud de Scutari : Guillaume Arianit, Paul Matarango, Vladislav Jonima, comte de Dioclée et de l'Albanie ..."
- Leskovac, Mladen; Forišković, Aleksandar; Popov, Čedomir (2004). Српски биографски речник. Budućnost. p. 246. ISBN 9788683651627. "... Унет је у списак сведока у повељи краља Милутина за манастир Богородице ратачке из 1306. ..."
- Schmitt, Oliver Jens (2001), Das venezianische Albanien (1392-1479), München: R. Oldenbourg Verlag GmbH München, p. 87, ISBN 3-486-56569--9, "...erscheint ein Angehöriger eines alten ethnisch albanischen Adelsgeschlechts, Vladislav Jonima, als Zupan, später als „Graf von Dioclea und Küstenalbanien" Vladislav Jonima, als Zupan, später als „Graf von Dioclea und Küstenalbanien". Der slawische Vorname und die Stellung dieses vornehmen Albaners in einem slawisch dominierten Staat zeigt die enge Verbindung beider ethnischer Elemente, deren Oberschicht im Mittlerlater miteinander verschmolzen war."
- Lala, Etleva; Jaritz, Gerhard (2008). "Regnum Albaniae and the Papal Curia" (PDF). Central European University. pp. 142, 150.
