= Svrčina =

Svrčina (feminine: Svrčinová) is a Czech surname. Notable people with the surname include:

- Dalibor Svrčina (born 2002), Czech tennis player
- Lucie Svrčinová (born 1974), Czech synchronized swimmer
