= Shufada =

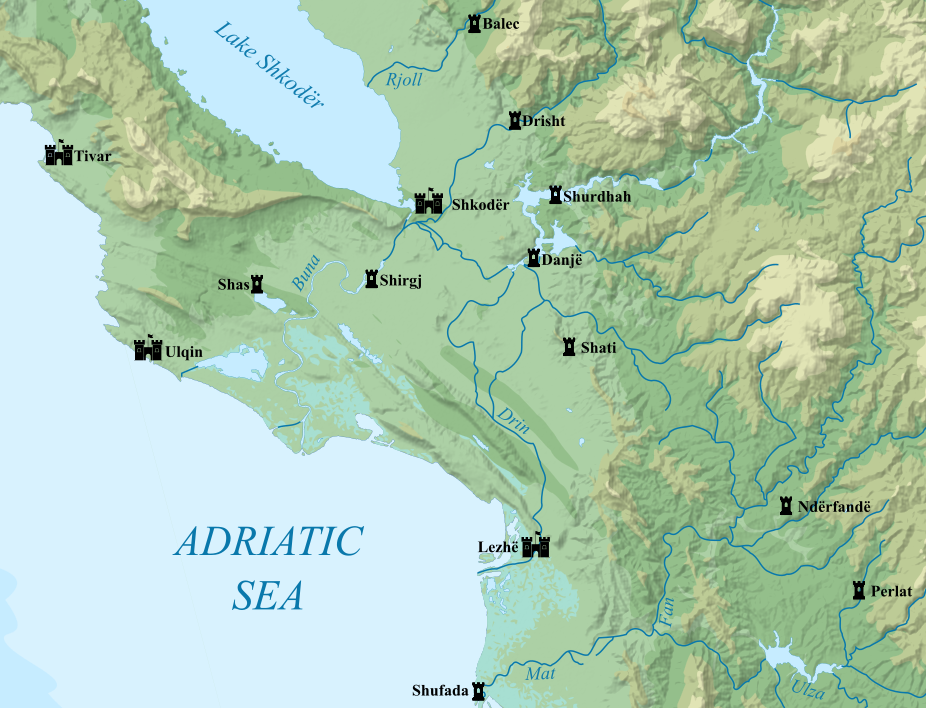
Shufada and nearby towns

Shufada also known as Shufadaja, Shufadah, or Suffada, was a medieval trade port in northern Albania. It was near the mouth of a river with academics proposing Mat, Ishëm and Erzen. It was, at the time, one among a string of ports in Albania that enjoyed prosperity and economic significance until being abandoned at the start of the Ottoman period. A 1420 commercial treaty between Gjon Kastrioti and the Republic of Ragusa shows that Shufada was the main customs port for the former's domains.

== See also ==
- Medieval Albania
