= Medieval Serbian noble titles =

In the Medieval Serbian state, a range of court and honorific titles were used.

== Overview ==
During the reign of King Stefan Milutin (r. 1282–1321) the Serbian court hierarchy was: stavilac, čelnik, kaznac, tepčija and vojvoda, the supreme title. In the Dečani chrysobulls, King Stefan Dečanski (r. 1321–1331) mentioned that the court dignitaries present at the Dečani assembly were the kaznac, tepčija, vojvoda, sluga and stavilac.

In the periods of the Serbian Kingdom and Serbian Empire, several Byzantine titles and honorifics were adopted, such as sevast, protosevast and sevastokrator. After the crowning of Stefan Dušan as Emperor (1346), there was a further increase in the Byzantinization of the Serbian court, especially in court ceremonies and titles. From his new position, Dušan could grant titles only possible for an emperor to grant, such as despot, sevastokrator, and ćesar. The higher nobility – magnates (pl. velikaši or velmože) were signified with such titles, along the traditional vojvoda, veliki župan, etc.

== Titles ==
Court titles

- župan (жупан). The Serbs in the Early Middle Ages were organized into administrative divisions, župa (pl. župe), a confederation of village communities (roughly the equivalent of a county), headed by a local župan (a magistrate or governor, pl. župani). According to Fine, the governorship was hereditary, and the župan reported to the Serbian prince, whom they were obliged to aid in war. This title later evolved into veliki župan.
- veliki župan (велики жупан). The title signifies overlordship, as the leader of lesser chieftains titled župan. It was originally used by the Serb rulers in the 11th and 12th centuries. Afterwards, it was a high rank with notable holders such as Altoman Vojinović (fl. 1335–59).
- vojvoda (војвода, lit. "war-leader", belli dux). A senior official, both a military rank (equivalent of general) and gubernatorial title (equivalent of dux, "duke"), and the highest court title during the time of Stefan Milutin (1282–1321). Later, the title of veliki vojvoda was introduced.
- Velikaš (великаш, lit. great, large, grand)
- knez (кнез) or knjaz (књаз). Translated as "duke" or "prince".
- kefalija (кефалија). The earlier župan title was abolished and replaced with the Greek-derived kefalija (kephale, "head, master") during the reign of Emperor Stefan Dušan.
- kaznac (казнац, lit. "penalty inflicter"). In charge of the treasury in the territory under his jurisdiction, kaznačina, derived from kazna ("penalty"). It was the equivalent of camerarius (chamberlain).
- tepčija (тепчија).
- gospodar (господар) or gospodin (господин, "lord").
- čelnik (челник, lit. "head"). During the reign of Stefan Milutin (1282–1321), the title holder was entrusted with the security of property belonging to the Church from the aristocrats, so the holder appeared in the role of a judge or executor of the ruler's decisions, in disputes between the church and the nobility. It is unclear if there was one or several with that title at the court at that time. During King Stefan Dečanski's reign (1321–31), there was two or three title holders at the same time. During Stefan Dušan's reign, the title of veliki čelnik (велики челник) is first mentioned. After Jovan Oliver and Dimitrije, it seems that the title was not given at the court of Stefan Dušan (r. 1331–55).
- stavilac (ставилац, lit. "placer"). It was similar to the Byzantine court offices of domestikos and cup-bearer (pinkernes, known in Serbian as peharnik). It had a role in the ceremony at the royal table, though the holder could be entrusted with jobs that had nothing to do with court ritual. According to studies of Rade Mihaljčić, the holder was in charge of acquiring, preparing and serving food at the royal table. It was a confidant duty, given to the highest and most notable nobility, in which the ruler relied on in all occasions. Its oldest mention is from the court of King Stefan Milutin (r. 1282–1321), when Đuraš Vrančić had the title. The title of stavilac ranked as the last in the hierarchy of the Serbian court, behind čelnik, kaznac, tepčija and vojvoda, the supreme title. It was, nevertheless, quite prestigious as it enabled its holder to be very close to the ruler. There is not much information on the title-holders at the court of King Stefan Dečanski, there is however much information on those at the court of King and Emperor Stefan Dušan (r. 1331–1355).
- Ban
- protovestijar (протовестијар) or veliki kaznac (велики казнац). From Byzantine protovestiarios, minister of finance, holders include Nikola, Petar, Ivan, Marin
- despot (деспот). From Byzantine despotes.
- kesar (кесар). From Byzantine kaísar (καῖσαρ), in turn derived from Latin caesar, holders include Grgur Golubić,
- domestik (доместик). From Byzantine domestikos. Later, the title veliki domestik was introduced.
- logotet (логотет). Financial, from Byzantine logothetes. Later, the title veliki logotet was introduced.
- čauš (чауш) and veliki čauš (велики чауш).
- sluga (слуга). A special court office, similar to stavilac. Later elevated into veliki sluga (велики слуга), an equivalent of megas domestikos.
- komornik (коморник)
- dijak (дијак)
- peharnik (пехарник)

Honorifics

- vitez (витез, "knight"). The title was held by Palman, a Styrian nobleman that served Stefan Dušan (1331–55) as a bodyguard and mercenary commander, and possibly also Đuraš Ilijić.
- sevast (севаст). Honorific. From Byzantine sebastos, meaning "venerable" (equivalent to Roman augustus).
- protosevast (протосеваст). Honorific. From Byzantine protosebastos. Notable holders include Hrelja.
- sevastokrator (севастократор). Honorific. From Byzantine sevastokrator.

== Sources ==
- Blagojević, Miloš (2001). Државна управа у српским средњовековним земљама [State administration in the Serb medieval lands] (in Serbian). Službeni list SRJ. ISBN 9788635504971.
- Ćirković, Sima; Mihaljčić, Rade (1999). Лексикон српског средњег века (in Serbian). Knowledge. ISBN 9788683233014.
- Ćorović, Vladimir (2001) [1997]. "Kočina krajina". Историја српског народа (in Serbian). Belgrade: Јанус.
- Dinić, Mihailo; Ćirković, Sima (1978). Српске земље у средњем веку: историјско-географске студије (in Serbian). Српска књижевна задруга.
- Ferjančić, Božidar (1970). Севастократори и кесари у Српском царству [Sebastocrators and Caesares in the Serbian Empire]. Зборник Филозофског факултета (in Serbian). XI (1). Belgrade: 255–269.
- Ferjančić, Božidar (1960). Despoti u Vizantiji i južnoslovenskim zemljama [Despots in Byzantium and the South Slavic Lands] (in Serbian). Vol. 336. Belgrade: SANU.
- Fine, John V. A. Jr. (1991) [1983]. The Early Medieval Balkans: A Critical Survey from the Sixth to the Late Twelfth Century. Ann Arbor: University of Michigan Press. ISBN 0-472-08149-7.
- Fine, John Van Antwerp Jr. (1994) [1987]. The Late Medieval Balkans: A Critical Survey from the Late Twelfth Century to the Ottoman Conquest. University of Michigan Press. ISBN 0472082604.
- Maksimović, L. (1993). "Sevasti u srednjovekovnoj Srbiji". Zbornik radova Vizantološkog instituta. 32: 137–147.
- Mihaljčić, Rade (1976). "Ставилац" [Stavilac]. Istorijski časopis. ХХIII: 5–21.
- Mihaljčić, Rade (2001). Владарске титуле обласних господара - прилог владарској идеологији у старијој српској прошлости.
- Novaković, Stojan (1908). "Византијски чинови и титуле у српским земљама XI-XV века". Глас СКА. LXXVIII: 178–280.
- Šarkić, Srđan (1996). Srednjovekovno srpsko pravo (in Serbian). Matica srpska. ISBN 9788636303696.
- Stanojević, Stanoje (2000). Narodna enciklopedija: srpsko-hrvatsko-slovenačka (in Serbian). Budućnost.
- Ćirković, Sima (2004). The Serbs. Malden: Blackwell Publishing. ISBN 9781405142915.
