= Dragoš =

Serbian noble

- veliki župan
- Born: 13th century Kingdom of Serbia
- Died: After 1294
- Issue: A daughter who married Shishman
- Occupation: magnate

Dragoš (Serbian Cyrillic: Драгош; fl. 1293–1294) was a magnate in the service of Serbian King Stefan Milutin (r. 1282–1321), with the title of veliki župan.

== History ==
Dragoš's origin is unknown. In the 11th- and 12th centuries, veliki župan was the Serbian royal title. With the crowning of Stefan as King in 1217, the title of veliki župan lost its rank and declined, especially with the adoption of Byzantine Greek noble titles (despot, kesar, sevastokrator, etc.). At the court of Stefan Milutin, the magnate (velmoža) Dragoš bore the title of veliki župan. Another veliki župan under Milutin was Vratislav (fl. 1319). The nobility held hereditary territory (baština) awarded or confirmed by the Serbian ruler.

Shishman of Vidin (a vassal of the Golden Horde) and his Tatar mercenaries raided Serbian lands. Milutin defeated Shishman in c. 1293, and sent envoys to Nogay Khan to prevent an attack by the Horde. Negotiations were then held between Milutin with his magnates and Nogay's highest envoys (Serbian: poklisari) in Serbia, which ended with a peace treaty which included Milutin's son Stefan Dečanski staying with the Horde to maintain the treaty, concluded most likely in 1294. Their participation shows that the magnates had an important role in the negotiations, and based on the hostage provision they must have given their consent to the reached agreement. Instead of annexing Shishman's lands to the east of Serbia, Milutin reinstalled Shishman as despot and concluded an alliance, also marrying Shishman with Dragoš's daughter. The marriage shows the notable influence held by Dragoš.

Dragoš and veliki vojvoda (general) Novak Grebostrek are the only nobility mentioned in the Lives of Serbian Kings and Archbishops collection.

== See also ==
- Jovan Dragoslav (fl. 1290–1315), veliki kaznac under Stefan Milutin
- Kuzma (fl. 1306), tepčija under Stefan Milutin
- Hardomil (d. before 1327), tepčija under Stefan Milutin
- Miroslav (fl. 1305–06), kaznac under Stefan Milutin
- Dmitar (fl. 1321), kaznac under Stefan Milutin
- Branko (fl. 1306–19), čelnik under Stefan Milutin
- Gradislav Vojšić (fl. 1284–1327), čelnik under Stefan Milutin
- Đuraš Vrančić, stavilac under Stefan Milutin
- Ilija (fl. 1318–22), knez of Zeta under Stefan Milutin
- Bogdan (fl. 1312), župan in Popovo under Stefan Milutin

== Sources ==
- Androvski, Ivo (2021). "ЖИТИЯТА НА ВЛАДЕТЕЛИ И АРХИЕПИСКОПИ ОТ СТАРОСРЪБСКАТА ЛИТЕРАТУРА (ХIII–XIV В.)–ЦЕНЕН ИЗВОР ЗА БЪЛГАРСКАТА ИСТОРИЯ–II ЧАСТ". Годишник, Книга Изкуства. 114 (2). Софийски университет »Св. Климент Охридски«: 47–72.
- Ćirković, Sima; Mihaljčić, Rade (1999). Лексикон српског средњег века [Lexicon of the Serb Middle Ages] (in Serbian). Knowledge. ISBN 9788683233014.
- Ivanović, Miloš (2022). "Краљ, властела и војска [King, Nobility, Army]". Sveti kralj Milutin: Vladar na raskršćima svetova. Zadužbina Svetog manastira Hilandara, Beograd. pp. 243–273. ISBN 978-86-7768-117-3.
- Radojičić, Đorđe Sp. (1955). "Похвала кнезу Лазару са стиховима". Историјски Часопис. 5. Istorijski institut: 245.
- Šarkić, Srđan (2012). "Владарске титуле у средњовековној Србији" [Monarch's titles in Mediaeval Serbia] (PDF). Зборник Радова Правног Факултета у Новом Саду. 46 (2): 23–35.
