= Baldovin =

Serbian knez (duke) and kaznac (financial chancellor)

- knez (duke) кнез Бал`довин
- Reign: Lord of Vranje
- Predecessor: Kuzma
- Successor: Maljušat
- Other titles: kaznac (financial chancellor), equivalent of camerarius
- Born: Kotor, Serbian Kingdom (modern Montenegro)
- Issue: Maljušat

Baldovin (Serbian Cyrillic: Балдовин; fl. 1325–1345) was a Serbian knez (duke) and kaznac (financial chancellor) that served King Stefan Uroš III (r. 1321–1331). He held the province around Vranje.

== Life ==
According to Konstantin Jireček, he was most likely born in Kotor. Most scholars maintain that Baldovin was a nobleman mentioned by both his titles (knez and kaznac), although some theorize that there were in fact two magnates by that name. Baldovin was possibly an ancestor of the Bagaš noble family.

Metropolitan Arsenije of Prizren, kaznac Baldovin, vojvoda Gradislav, župan Vratko, knez Grgur Kurjaković, stavilac Miloš (title mentioned for the first time), vojvoda Dejan Manjak, Gradislav Sušenica, Nikola Buća, and archdeacon Marin Baranic, all signed the document issued by Stefan Uroš III, dated 22 January 1325, for the sale of some maritime possessions to the Republic of Ragusa. The possessions, Ston and Pelješac, were officially handed over in 1333, with Baldovin also being present.

He ruled over the province around Vranje, which he had received from King Stephen Uroš III. The King's chrysobull mentioned "Baldovin and his children", who received the "Church of St. Nicholas in Vranje, the villages, the march, the vineyards, the katun, the meadows, the mills, and all sides of the village [Vranje]." The entry was cited by King Stefan Dušan in one of his charters dated between 1343 and 1345, where he confirmed the gift of the Church of St. Nicholas to Hilandar by župan (count) Maljušat, the son of Baldovin. Emperor Dušan does mention that Baldovin and his children received the chrysobull for their service to King Stephen Uroš III, meaning that the children were already adults by the time of the chrysobull of Uroš III.

Court offices
Preceded by Jovan Dragoslav	kaznac of the Serbian Kingdom (financial chancellor) fl. 1325–1333	Succeeded by Gradislav Borilović
Other offices
Preceded by Kuzma	Governor of Vranje ?	Succeeded by Maljušat

== Annotations ==
1. Name: His given name is Baldovin (Балдовин), and he is mostly known by his titles, such as kaznac Baldovin or knez Baldovin. The name Baldovin, derived from Germanic Baldwin, was very rarely found in the Balkans.
