= Novak Grebostrek =

Medieval Serbian general

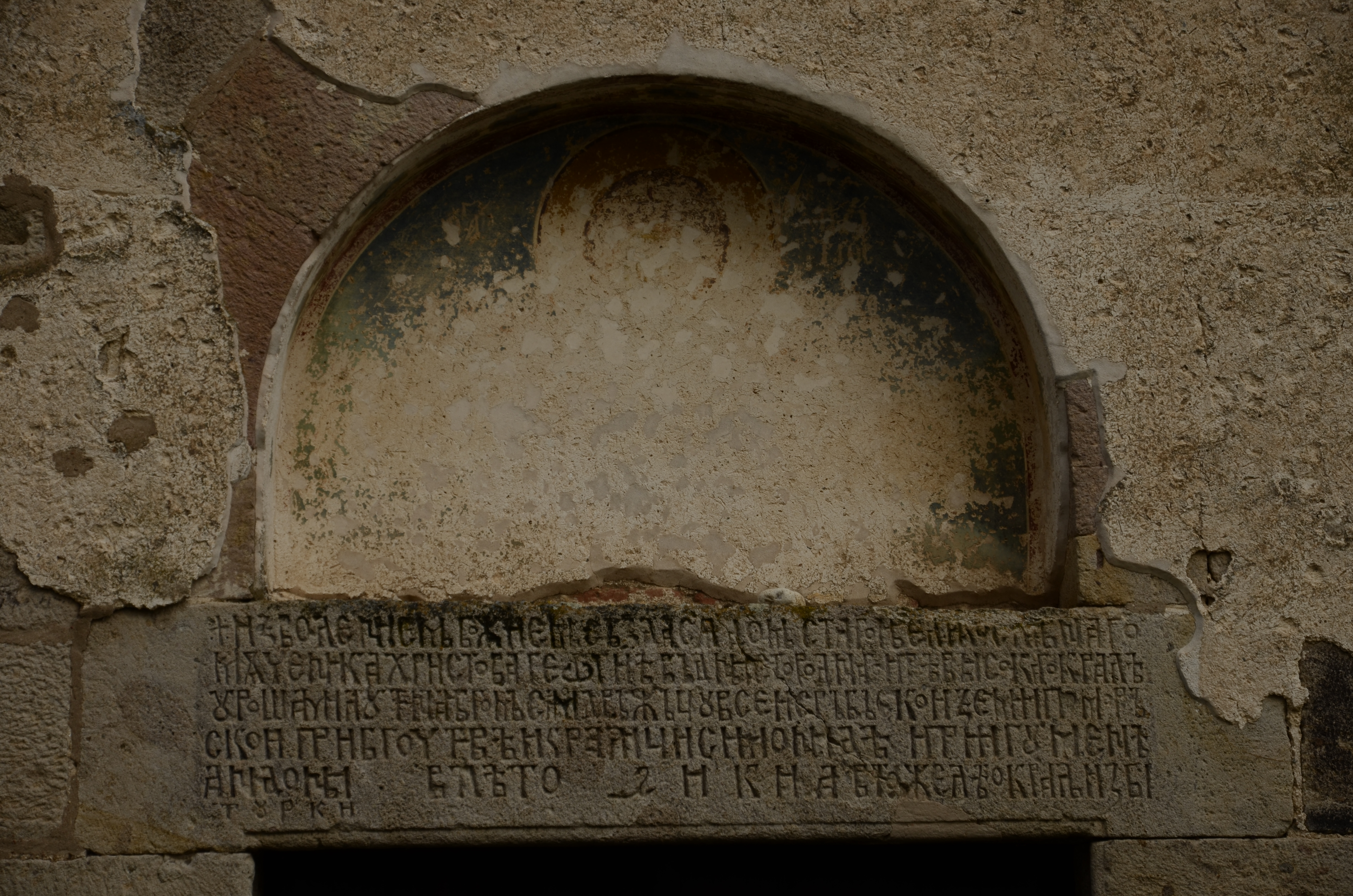
- Inscription mentioning the victories against the Turks, Church of St. George, Staro Nagoričane
- Born: Novak; 13th century Kingdom of Serbia
- Military career
- Allegiance: Kingdom of Serbia
- Service years: fl. 1312–14
- Rank: veliki vojvoda
- Nickname: Grebostrek ("the one who stabs deep cuts")

Novak Grebostrek (Serbian: Новак Гребострек; fl. 1312–14) was a veliki vojvoda of Serbian King Stefan Milutin (r. 1282–1321), who commanded a Serbian contingent supporting Byzantine Emperor Andronikos II Palaiologos against Turks in Asia Minor. The victories of Grebostrek have been recorded in the archives of the Church of St. George, Staro Nagoričane and in two chrysobulls of Andronikos II to the Serbian Hilandar monastery. Due to the victories in Asia Minor, Stefan Milutin had a church built in Jerusalem, dedicated to the Holy Archangels.

== History ==
Novak is the oldest known veliki vojvoda ("great general") in Serbia. The title of veliki vojvoda was the highest military rank, whom the monarch gave the command to lead armies on their own. He was a magnate (velikaš) in the service of king Stefan Milutin. As part of the higher nobility, magnates held hereditary territory (baština) awarded or confirmed by the Serbian ruler. In Serbian written sources, he is mentioned in Danilo II's Hagiography of King Milutin (included in the Lives of Serbian Kings and Archbishops), in the Ulijarska povelja charter of king Milutin, and the Short Hagiography of King Milutin, the last preserved in three manuscripts based on the first-mentioned charter.

The Serbian king Stefan Milutin sent Novak Grebostrek at the command of a Serbian contingent to aid Milutin's father-in-law, the Byzantine emperor Andronikos II Palaiologos, against Turks in Anatolia. Grebostrek is mentioned as having led a second Serbian contingent sent by Milutin in aid, the first, made up of the king's relatives and bodyguards, having participated in the Battle of Gallipoli (1312). That first contingent, which fought Turks in Thrace and Gallipolli, is said to have been led by Milutin himself. Milutin and his bodyguards had prior to these dispatches defeated Turk mercenaries back home. While Milutin wanted to lead the army personally against the Turks in Anatolia, he chose to deal with the conflict in the west, against Mladen II of Bribir, and gave the command to Grebostrek to lead the campaign into Anatolia. After the destruction of the Turks at Gallipolli, Grebostrek arrived with the second Serbian contingent at Herakleia, where the Serbs were hosted by emperor Andronikos II. As the Turk threat in Thrace was removed, the operation was to attack the Turks in their land, mainly the Beylik of Aydin. Andronikos II sent the Serbian contingent to accompany the Byzantines to fight Aydin, under the rule of Mehmed. Grebostrek's army likely had the task of liberating the Byzantine counties around Prussa, Nicaea and Nicomedia from the Turks. According to Serbian sources, Grebostrek led great victories and destroyed the Turks and their towns, while it has been concluded that the campaign mostly included pillage raids and desolation. For king Milutin and the Serbian state, Grebostrek led a victorious campaign in the name of Christianity, against heresy and the infidels, characterized as a holy war in Danilo II's accounts. According to S. Novaković, Grebostrek would not have fought more than a year, and could have pushed the Turks from the maritime fields and returned some smaller Byzantine cities. Following the campaign, Andronikos II again hosted the Serbian contingent and gifted them richly. Upon the return to Serbia, the contingent was welcomed by the king and archbishop Sava III. Grebostrek's campaign did not however manage to bring back Byzantine supremacy against the Turks, but it was an important victory for both Byzantium and Serbia, and as an event in Byzantine–Serbian relations.

In two chrysobulls of Andronikos II Palaiologos to the Serbian Hilandar monastery at Mount Athos, dating to October 1313 and July 1317, Andronikos showed gratitude to Stefan Milutin for his aid, as detailed in the prefaces. With the renovation of the Church of St. George, Staro Nagoričane, king Milutin as ktetor (founder, donator) had the victories against the Turks included in the ktetor inscription and symbolically in the ktetor fresco, as a triumph. King Milutin also had a church built in Jerusalem, dedicated to the Holy Archangels, due to the victories.

The name Grebostrek (archaic грѣбострѣкь) is a warrior nickname, meaning "the one who stabs / stabs deep cuts / furrows (into enemy force)", and possibly, it originated in Greek as Aulakokoptes (Αὐλακοκóπτης).

It has been claimed that Novak Grebostrek was the father of Vojihna. Historian Svetomir Nikolajević concluded this on the basis after Alexander Hilferding, who recorded folk traditions traveling Serbia before 1859.

Novak Grebostrek and veliki župan Dragoš are the only nobility mentioned in the Lives of Serbian Kings and Archbishops collection, while Novak is the only one mentioned in the Hagiography of King Milutin. After Novak, Jovan Oliver bore the title of veliki vojvoda.

== Legacy ==
The known hajduk character of Stari Novak ("Old Novak") in Serbian epic poetry is a merger of several individuals in Serbian history, including 14th-century Novak Grebostrek, 15th-century Novak Karaljuk, and 16th-century Starina (Baba) Novak.

He is enumerated in Serbian epic poetry, and poems (or dramas), of Nikola V. Đorić (1859–1913) in the tragedy Krinka (1890), Branislav Nušić (1864–1938) in the tragedy Nahod, Milutin Bojić (1892–1917) in a poem, Dragoljub J. Filipović (1884–1933), Dragutin Subotić (1887–1952), and Rastko Tadić (1933–1994).

== See also ==
- Jovan Dragoslav (fl. 1290–1315), veliki kaznac under Stefan Milutin
- Vratislav (fl. 1319), veliki župan under Stefan Milutin
- Kuzma (fl. 1306), tepčija under Stefan Milutin
- Hardomil (d. before 1327), tepčija under Stefan Milutin
- Miroslav (fl. 1305–06), kaznac under Stefan Milutin
- Dmitar (fl. 1321), kaznac under Stefan Milutin
- Branko (fl. 1306–19), čelnik under Stefan Milutin
- Gradislav Vojšić (fl. 1284–1327), čelnik under Stefan Milutin
- Đuraš Vrančić, stavilac under Stefan Milutin
- Ilija (fl. 1318–22), knez of Zeta under Stefan Milutin
- Bogdan (fl. 1312), župan in Popovo under Stefan Milutin

Military offices
First	veliki vojvoda of Stefan Milutin fl. 1312–1314	Vacant Next known title holder: Jovan Oliver

== Sources ==
- Babić, Boris. "Византијски цареви Андроник II и Андроник III Палеолози у дјелима српских средњовјековних писаца." Banjaluka November Meetings. 2023.
- Bubalo, Đorđe (2018). "Новак Гребострек, велики војвода" [Novak Grebostrek", Grand Duke]. Српски биографски речник VII, Mл-Пан [Serbian Biographical Dictionary, vol. VII, Ml-Pan]. Novi Sad, Matica srpska: 521 – via Academia.edu.
- Ivanović, Miloš (2022). "Краљ, властела и војска [King, Nobility, Army]". Sveti kralj Milutin: Vladar na raskršćima svetova. Zadužbina Svetog manastira Hilandara, Beograd. pp. 243–273. ISBN 978-86-7768-117-3.
- Ivanović, Miloš (2019). "Serbian Hagiographies on the Warfare and Political Struggles of the Nemanjić Dynasty (from the Twelfth to Fourteenth Century)": 103–129.
- Kostić, Dragutin (1937). Tumačenja druge knjige srpskih narodnih pjesama Vuka St. Karadžića: dodatak četvrtom državnom izdanju. Državna Štamparija. p. 116.
- Novaković, Stojan (1893). Срби и Турци XIV и XV века: историјске студије о првим борбама с најездом турском пре и после боја на Косову. Državna štamparija.
- Oikonomides, Nicolas (1993). "The Turks in Europe (1305–13) and the Serbs in Asia Minor (1313)". In Zachariadou, E. (ed.). The Ottoman Emirate (1300-1389) (PDF). Rethymnon. pp. 159–168.
- Pekić, Miloš (2017). Старина Новак, епски јунак (PDF). Музеј Основне школе „Старина Новак“.
- Purković, Miodrag (1985). Srpska kultura srednjega veka. Izd. Srpske pravoslavne eparhije za zapadnu Evropu. p. 22.
- Radojičić, Đorđe Sp. (1955). "Похвала кнезу Лазару са стиховима". Историјски часопис. 5. Istorijski institut: 245.
- Rudić, Srđan (2006). Властела Илирског грбовника [The Nobility of the Illyric Coat of Arms]. Istorijski institut Beograd. p. 131. ISBN 978-86-7743-055-9.
- Stevović, Ivan (2021). "Manastir Prepodobnog Prohora Pčinjskog i crkva Svetog Đorđa u Starom Nagoričinu: jedan vid obrazovanja sakralne topografije u doba kralja Milutina". Prepodobni Prohor Pčinjski, 950 godina u srpskom narodu, tematski zbornik: 37–44.
- Veljković, Žarko B. (2023). "О НАДИМКУ МИЛУТИНОВОГ ВЕЛИКОГ ВОЈВОДЕ НОВАКА, ГРЕБОСТРЕК". Свети краљ Милутин и његово доба: историја, књижевност, уметност. pp. 137–147. doi:10.46793/6008-065-5.137V. ISBN 978-86-6008-065-5.
