= Jovan Dragoslav =

Serbian nobleman (fl. 1290–1315)

- veliki kaznac, (possibly) despot
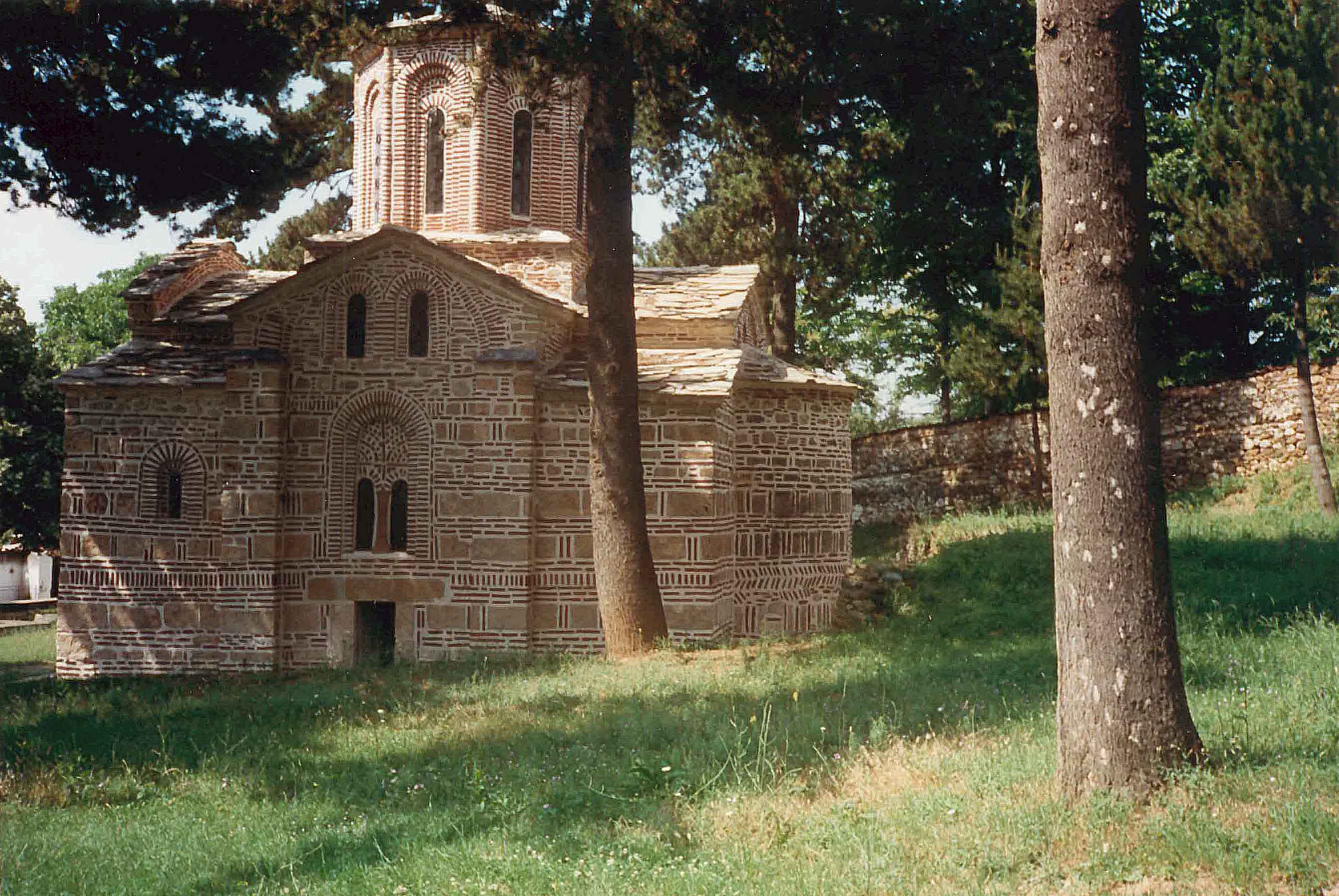
- The church he founded in Mušutište. It was destroyed in 1999.
- Born: Kingdom of Serbia
- Died: after 1315
- Spouse: Jelena
- Issue: Staniša (son) and Ana (daughter)

Dragoslav (Serbian Cyrillic: Драгослав) or Jovan Dragoslav (Јован Драгослав; fl. 1290–1315) was a Serbian nobleman with the titles of kaznac, and then veliki kaznac, serving King Stefan Milutin (r. 1282–1321). The kaznac was a financial-taxation office, translated into Latin camerarius (chamberlain). In the hierarchy of the Serbian court, kaznac ranked higher than stavilac and čelnik, and lower than tepčija and vojvoda, the supreme title. He was part of the generation of Serbian nobility that were empowered in the early 14th century.

Dragoslav served as kaznac in the area of Skopje, mentioned in ca. 1300, then was elevated to veliki kaznac some time prior to 1315. According to P. Grujić, he first served Milutin in ca. 1290 as sluga, became kaznac in ca. 1300, then veliki kaznac in ca. 1315. P. Grujić stressed that his career started as sluga (a special court office, similar to stavilac), mentioned in a confirmation of Ragusan privileges. Ferjančić was unsure of this, while the Serbian Institute of Byzantinology now agrees that Dragoslav began his rise on Milutin's court as sluga. In 1300, he was mentioned along his wife kyra Jelena, and at that time held the region of Sušica which was around Žegligovo. He donated a vineyard, called Mavrovo, to the Monastery of St. George near Skopje, as part of Milutin's endowments. He founded the Church of the Virgin Hodegetria in the village of Mušutište, near Prizren, together with his wife, son and daughter in 1315. Dragoslav had acquired good master artists for his church. In an inscription in the church, his elevated title of veliki kaznac is mentioned — this meant that he was the supreme court administrator of state assets. According to Svetislav Mandić, he later had the title of despot. It was possibly given to him by Byzantine Emperor Andronikos II Palaiologos (r. 1272–1328). Mandić also believes that he received the name Jovan from the church (as did Jovan Oliver), of a special honorable character, and was not born with it. According to some, Dragoslav married Teodora, the mother of Stefan Dušan and former Queen consort, sometime between 1322 and 1326, and thence received the title of despot.

His church was destroyed with explosives in 1999 by ethnic Albanians.

== See also ==
- Dragoš (fl. 1290s), veliki župan of Stefan Milutin
- Novak Grebostrek (fl. 1312–14), veliki vojvoda of Stefan Milutin

== Sources ==
- Blagojević, Miloš (2001). Državna uprava u srpskim srednjovekovnim zemljama. Službeni list SRJ. pp. 21–23. ISBN 9788635504971.
- Ferjančić, Božidar (1960). Despoti u Vizantiji i Južnoslovenskim zemljama. Naučno Delo.
- Mandić, Svetislav (1986). Velika gospoda sve srpske zemlje i drugi prosopografski prilozi. Srpska književna zadruga. pp. 53, 106, 192. ISBN 9788637900122.
- Mandić, Svetislav (1990). "Деспот Јован Драгослав". Carski čin Stefana Nemanje: činjenice i pretpostavke o srpskom srednjovekovlju. Srpska književna zadruga. pp. 216–220. ISBN 9788637902003.
- Mandić, Svetislav (1981). Črte i reze: fragmenti starog imenika. Slovo ljubve. pp. 71–75.
- Purković, Miodrag (1985). Srpska kultura srednjega veka. Izd. Srpske pravoslavne eparhije za zapadnu Evropu. p. 27.
- Srejović, Dragoslav; Gavrilović, Slavko; Ćirković, Sima M. (1982). Istorija srpskog naroda: Od najstarijih vremena do Maričke bitke (1371). Srpska književna zadruga. p. 494.
- Srpska akademija nauka i umetnosti (1908). Glas. Vol. 78–80. Srpska akademija nauka i umetnosti. p. 203.

Court offices
First	veliki kaznac of King Stefan Milutin fl. 1315	Succeeded by ?
Preceded by Mrnjan as serving Stefan Uroš I	kaznac of King Stefan Milutin fl. 1300; Served alongside: Miroslav (fl. 1306)	Succeeded by Baldovin as serving Stefan Dečanski
