= Ilija (kefalija) =

Serbian nobleman

- knez (count); kefalija (governor)
- Born: second half of the 13th century
- Died: first half of the 14th century
- Family: Đurašević
- Issue: Đuraš Ilijić
- Father: Đuraš Vrančić
- Occupation: Serbian royal deputy, minister, and governor of Zeta

Ilija (Serbian Cyrillic: Илија; fl. 1318–22) was a Serbian nobleman who served kings Stefan Milutin (r. 1282–1321) and Stefan Dečanski (r. 1321–31) with the titles of knez (comes, count) and kefalija (governor). At the end of Milutin's reign (and life), Ilija governed Zeta (a crown land), instead of the Young King, Stefan Dečanski, who was held in Constantinople since 1314. He first held the title of knez (fl. 1318), and received the title of kefalija by 1321. There existed two types of kefalija in Serbia, local ones (as in Byzantium) and provincial ones; Ilija belonged to the latter. Ilija was a royal deputy.

The Republic of Ragusa paid a tax to the Kingdom of Serbia, called the "St. Demetrius income" (svetodmitarski dohodak). In a document dated 4 November 1318, the collectors were bishop Stefan of Skadar and knez Ilija of Zeta. He is mentioned in a document dated 23 September 1321, being ordered along with bishop Petar of Skadar to raise the income from Ragusa. He is mentioned in 27 October 1321, regarding bishop Petar, who was authorized by Stefan Milutin to travel to Dubrovnik, but was unable to. He is mentioned as Stefan Dečanski's minister in Ragusan documents dating to 24 August 1322.

His father Đuraš Vrančić served King Stefan Milutin (r. 1282–1321) with the court title of stavilac. His son, Đuraš Ilijić, served Stefan Dečanski, Stefan Dušan (r. 1331–55) and Stefan Uroš V (r. 1355–71), from 1326 until his death in 1362, with the title of čelnik ("head"), and governed Upper Zeta.

== Annotations ==
1. In Latin documents, he is mentioned as "nobillis vir. d. Elia, comes de Çenta" (1318), "Ylia cefalia" (1321), "Helie de Raxia", etc.

== Sources ==
- Bešić, Z. (1970). Istorija Črne Gore: Od kraja XII do kraja XV vijeka. Vol. 2. Red. za istoriju Crne Gore.
- Blagojević, Miloš (2001). Državna uprava u srpskim srednjovekovnim zemljama. Službeni list SRJ. ISBN 9788635504971.
- Blagojević, Miloš; Petković, Sreten (1989). Srbija u doba Nemanjića. TRZ "VAJAT". ISBN 9788670390287.
- Novak, Viktor (2007). Revue historique. Vol. 54. Istorijski institut u Beogradu.
- Veselinović, Andrija; Ljušić, Radoš (2008). Srpske dinastije. Službeni glasnik. ISBN 978-86-7549-921-3.
