= Prvoslav Radojević =

Serbian nobleman

Prvoslav Radojević (Serbian Cyrillic: Првослав Радојевић; fl. 1280) was a Serbian nobleman in the service of Queen Helen of Anjou (consort 1245–76; dowager 1276–1314), with the title of kaznac (chamberlain, camerarius). The title-holder was among the foremost at the Serbian court, taking care of state finances. He was a provincial kaznac, as opposed to the royal (statewide) veliki kaznac. Queen Helen was the consort of king Stefan Uroš I (r. 1243–76) and mother of kings Stefan Dragutin (r. 1276–82) and Stefan Milutin (r. 1282–1321). The Queen governed Zeta and Trebinje during the rule of her sons, until 1309. Prvoslav Radojević is mentioned as serving the Queen in Trebinje in a document dated 8 February 1280 (Pervosclavus Radoevich camerarius Domine Regine in Tribigna). This also shows that Queen Helen had her own kaznac in Trebinje. His office was succeeded by Mrnjan, who is known to have held that office between 1288 and 1290 (possibly somewhat earlier).

== Sources ==
- Blagojević, Miloš (2001). Državna uprava u srpskim srednjovekovnim zemljama (in Serbian). Službeni list SRJ. pp. 20, 21, 39, 40. ISBN 9788635504971.
- Dinić, Mihailo; Ćirković, Sima (1978). Српске земље у средњем веку: историјско-географске студије (in Serbian). Српска књижевна задруга. pp. 134, 138.
- Purković, Miodrag (1985). Srpska kultura srednjega veka (in Serbian). Izd. Srpske pravoslavne eparhije za zapadnu Evropu.
- SANU (1991). Arhiepiskop Danilo II i njegovo doba: Međunarodni naučni skup povodom 650 godina od smrti : decembar 1987 (in Serbian). Srpska akademija nauka i umetnosti. p. 144. ISBN 9788670251373.
