= Đuraš Vrančić =

Serbian nobleman

- stavilac
- Family: Đurašević (Crnojević)
- Issue: Ilija

Đuraš Vrančić (Serbian Cyrillic: Ђураш Вранчић) was a Serbian nobleman who served King Stefan Milutin (r. 1282–1321) with the court title of stavilac. He is the oldest known stavilac. The title of stavilac ranked as the last in the hierarchy of the Serbian court, behind čelnik, kaznac, tepčija and vojvoda, the supreme title. He was the father of Ilija, and grandfather of Đuraš Ilijić. He is the earliest known member of the Đurašević (Crnojević). His name and title is inscribed on the tombstone of his grandson Đuraš Ilijić.

Court offices
First	stavilac of Stefan Milutin some time between 1282 and 1321	Unknown Next known title holder: Miloš Vojinović

== Sources ==
- Blagojević, Miloš (2001). Državna uprava u srpskim srednjovekovnim zemljama (in Serbian). Službeni list SRJ. ISBN 9788635504971.
- Veselinović, Andrija; Ljušić, Radoš (2008). Srpske dinastije (in Serbian). Službeni glasnik. ISBN 978-86-7549-921-3.
- Историјски часопис 23 (1976). Istorijski institut. 1 August 1976. pp. 10–. GGKEY:A0L6WC2K633.
