= Buca (disambiguation) =

Buca is a municipality and district of İzmir Province, Turkey.

Buca may also refer to:

- Buca River, a river in Fiji
- Buća, a Serbian noble family
