= Miloš Vojinović =

Serbian nobleman

- stavilac, court officer of the Serbian Empire
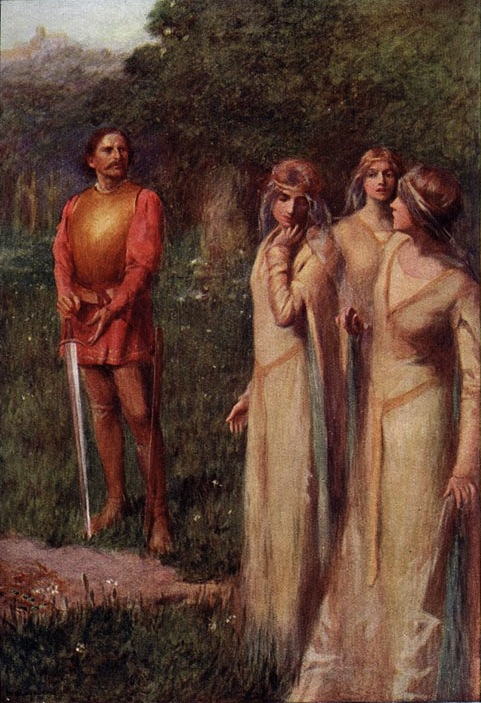

Serbian imperial magnate
- Reign: stavilac (fl. 1333)
- Born: Early 14th century Serbian Kingdom
- Died: after 1333
- Noble family: Vojinović
- Father: Vojin

Miloš Vojinović (Serbian: Милош Војиновић; fl. 1332) was a Serbian nobleman who served Emperor Stefan Dušan (r. 1331–55) as stavilac, the son of general Vojin and brother of Vojislav and Altoman. He is a hero of the pre-Kosovo cycle in Serbian epic poetry.

Miloš was the eldest son of Vojin, a vojvoda (general) that served King Stefan Dečanski and King Stefan Dušan and held the title of knez of Hum. Vojin was one of the more powerful nobles of King Stefan Dečanski, while his sons were in Young King Dušan's circle. When a conflict occurred between the King and his son, Dušan, however, Vojin and other noblemen joined the Young King Dušan (1330–31). Vojin's support of Dušan further elevated the Vojinović family.

Metropolitan Arsenije of Prizren, kaznac Baldovin, vojvoda Gradislav, župan Vratko, knez Grgur Kurjaković, stavilac Miloš (title mentioned for the first time), vojvoda Dejan Manjak, Gradislav Sušenica, Nikola Buća, and archdeacon Marin Baranić, all signed the document issued by Stefan Uroš III, dated 22 January 1325, for the sale of some maritime possessions to the Republic of Ragusa. The possessions, Ston and Pelješac, were officially handed over in 1333, with Miloš also being present. After the death of Miloš's father Vojin, his sons divided their father's province. Soon after Vojin's death, Miloš died without progeny, his possessions being divided among his brothers Vojislav and Altoman.

== Legacy ==
=== Serbian epic poetry ===
In Serbian epic poetry Miloš is celebrated as a central hero, most notably in the famous Wedding of Emperor Dušan. He is depicted as the youngest of the three Vojinović brothers, as a carefree and cheerful soul rejecting his noble background to be a shepherd in the Šar Mountains. Though carefree and simple-minded, Miloš is depicted as one of the strongest warriors in Dušan's empire and as being very strategic and adept in battle. It is believed that there once existed an entire epic cycle dedicated to Miloš, however the poems did not survive to when Vuk Stefanović Karadžić began documenting Serbian epics in 1814. Miloš is the central character in the following epic poems:

- Wedding of Emperor Dušan (Женидба Душанова) (recorded by Vuk Karadžić 1814)
- Miloš Vojinović and the Fiery Lions (Милош Војиновић и лави огњени) (recorded by Bogoljub Petranović 1870)
- Miloš Vojinović and the Duke of Kotor (Оклада) (recorded by Sima Milutinović 1837)

== Sources ==
- Fajfrić, Željko (2000a) [1998], Sveta loza Stefana Nemanje (in Serbian) (Internet ed.), Belgrade: "Tehnologije, izdavastvo, agencija Janus", "Rastko".
- Fajfrić, Željko (2000b), Veliki župan Nikola Altomanović (in Serbian) (Internet ed.), Belgrade: "Grafosrem", "Rastko".

Titles of nobility
Unknown	Stavilac of Serbian Empire; 1333	Unknown
