= Đuraš Ilijić =

Serbian commander and nobleman

- dominus, čelnik, vojvoda
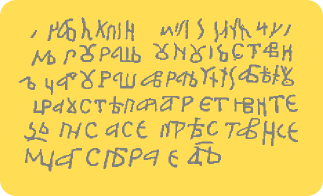
- Inscription on his tombstone
- Holding(s): Upper Zeta
- Born: Zeta (now Montenegro)
- Died: 1362 (murdered)
- Buried: Church of St. Michael, Miholjska prevlaka
- Family: Đurašević (Crnojević)
- Father: kefalija Ilija
- Occupation: provincial governor, military commander

Đuraš Ilijić (Serbian Cyrillic: Ђураш Илијић, fl. 1326–62) was a Serbian commander and nobleman who served the Serbian monarchs Stefan Dečanski (r. 1321–1331), Stefan Dušan (r. 1331–1355) and Uroš V (r. 1355–1371), from 1326 until his death in 1362. He had the title of čelnik ("head"), and governed Upper Zeta. He is an ancestor of the Crnojević noble family (a branch of the Đurašević).

== Origin and early life ==
Đuraš was born in Zeta, the son of Ilija, and grandson of Đuraš Vrančić His grandfather served King Stefan Milutin (r. 1282–1321) with the court title of stavilac, while his father had the title of kefalija, and governed Zeta. Đuraš had two brothers, Nikola and Vladin.

King Stefan Dečanski's confirmation on the rights of Ragusan merchants dating to March 25, 1326, was attended by vojvoda Mladen, tepčija Vladoje, and čelnik Đuraš Ilijić. At that time the title of čelnik was of a higher rank than stavilac, but lower than kaznac and tepčija, with vojvoda being the supreme title. It is unclear if there was one or several with that title at the court; the next year, Gradislav Vojšić is mentioned as serving the King as čelnik. In the conflict between Stefan Dečanski and his son Dušan in 1331, Đuraš sided with Dušan. According to Mavro Orbini (1601), when Dušan took his army from Zeta against his father in Raška, he had with him two advisors, Karavida and Đuraš. Dečanski surrendered in August, and Dušan was crowned King in September.

== Klis and Skradin ==
In early 1355, Emperor Dušan sent an army, led by knight Palman and Đuraš Ilijić, to defend Klis and Skradin which were in the hands of Dušan's sister, Jelena, the widow of Mladen III Šubić, from Hungarian attacks. Jelena was pressured by both Hungary and the Republic of Venice. Palman held Klis, while Đuraš held Skradin. Among Đuraš's army were his brothers, sons and nephews. The army was not able to hold out the pressure of the Hungarian army. The inhabitants were not ready, while there was some indecisive fighting. Emperor Dušan died on December 20, 1355, in unclear circumstances. This was his last activity. On January 10, 1356, Đuraš ceded Skradin to the Republic of Venice, as Dušan had ordered him in case it could not be defended from the Hungarians. Dušan had sought a flotilla from Venice for his planned campaign on Constantinople.

== Death ==
According to Mavro Orbini (1601), the Balšić family started to expand in Lower Zeta after the death of Emperor Dušan, during the weak rule of Emperor Uroš V. In 1360 they held a part of the land between Lake Skadar and the Adriatic Sea. The Balšić brothers continued into Upper Zeta, which was held by Đuraš Ilijić and his relatives, and killed Đuraš and had some of his relatives captured while the rest left the land, "and thus also ruled Upper Zeta". This took place after 1362.

In Prevlaka in the Bay of Kotor, a plate was found, which says, among other things, "Servant of Christ, Joakim, called Đuraš, grandson of stavilac Đuraš" (Раб Христу Јоаким а зовом Ђураш, унук ставиоца Ђураша) and that he was a "fearsome vitez of Emperor Stefan [Dušan]" (у цара у Стјепана трети витез).

He was the progenitor of the Đurašević, the later Crnojević noble family.

Titles of nobility
Preceded by Ilija	Governor of Upper Zeta; 1326–1362	Succeeded by Đurađ I Balšić as Lord of Zeta
Preceded by Jelena Nemanjić	Castellan of Skradin; 1355–January 10, 1356	Republic of Venice
Court offices
Preceded by Branko	čelnik of King Stefan Uroš III fl. 1326	Succeeded by Gradislav Vojšić

== Annotations ==
1. His surname is also spelled Ilić (Ђураш Илић). A Latin document calls him "dominus Juras Yscete" (Đuraš of Zeta), "filius quondam Helie de Raxia" (son of Ilija of Serbia).
