= Grgur Kurjaković =

Croatian knez (duke or count) of Krbava

Grgur Kurjaković or Gregory of Corbavia (Italian: Gregorio di Corbavia; fl. 1324–1360), was a Croatian knez (duke or count) of Krbava, one of the most notable Croatian magnates, in the service of the Hungarian kings.

Grgur was a member of the Kurjaković family, from the tribe of Gusić. His grandfather was Kurjak (Curiacio), count of Corbavia. He had two brothers, Budislav and Pavao (ital. Paolo). At least since 1324 Grgur Kurjaković was in royal service, as knight of the court, župan of Fejér County and castellan of Hasznos.

Metropolitan Arsenije of Prizren, kaznac Baldovin, vojvoda Gradislav, župan Vratko, knez Grgur Kurjaković, stavilac Miloš, vojvoda Dejan Manjak, Gradislav Sušenica, Nikola Buća, and archdeacon Marin Baranić, all signed the document issued by Serbian king Stefan Uroš III, dated 22 January 1325, for the sale of some maritime possessions to the Republic of Ragusa.

He is mentioned having stolen two katuni of Morlachs from his nephew Ivan Nelipčić.

He married Margarita Nelipić. Grgur had a son, Grgur Kurjaković II (fl. 1346), who also served the Hungarian kings.
