= Serbian royal titles =

The Serbian monarchs and royalty have assumed several regnal titles and styles throughout history.

== Middle Ages ==
The medieval Serbian state was a monarchy with a supreme ruler, and the regnal title changed from the 7th- to 15th century depending on expansion or contraction of state territory, as well as political, military or economic power of the ruler.

=== Archon and other Greek titles ===
The Serbian rulers of the Vlastimirović dynasty were titled "archon of Serbia" (Greek: αρχων Σερβλίας) according to De Administrando Imperio (960). The title of archon (ἄρχων, plural ἄρχοντες, archontes) was used by the Byzantines as a generic title for "prince, ruler". It has an antique origin, being used in the system of the nine Athenian officials (see Eponymous archon). It was used for the rulers of South Slavic polities as well as the Rus' and Bulgars. In Serbian historiography, the Slavic title of knez (кнез) is generally used instead of the Greek-derived arhont (архонт).

John Skylitzes (fl. 1057–59) used "archon of the Serbs" and "land of the Serbs" (Greek: Στέφανος ὀ καὶ Βοϊσθλάβος, ὀ τῶν Σέρβων ἄρχων ... τὁν τὀπον τῶν Σέρβων) for Stefan Vojislav (r. 1018–1043). Skylitzes used archon for foreign rulers with notable or full independence. Kekaumenos (fl. 1078) called Stefan Vojislav a toparch, which was a general term that simply signified local rulers in the edges of the empire. Vojislav's successor Mihailo is mentioned as "archegos ("chief, ruler") of the Triballi (an archaization) and Serbs" (Τριβαλλῶν καὶ Σέρβων...ἀρχηγός). Anna Komnene (1083–1153) called Mihailo I and Constantine Bodin (r. 1081–1101) the "Exarchs of Dalmats [i.e. Serbs]" (έξάρχους τῶν Δαλματῶν). Latin sources call both rex (king). The seal of Bodin calls him protosebastos (an honorific) and exousiastes of Dioklia and Serbia" (Greek: [(πρωτο)]σεβαστῷ καὶ ἐξουσιαστ(ῇ) Διοκλίας (καὶ) Σερβ[ίας]). In the mid-10th century List of Titles, exousiastes is ranked third, after exousiokrator and exousiarches, and above all ranks which have the prefix archi, and the rest, including exarchos. Judging by its usage and rank, exousiastes was explicitly used for foreign kings, and was not a generic term. The seals of Stefan Vojislav and Mihailo have not survived, so it is unknown what the Byzantine emperor recognized them as (in Byzantine nomenclature). In Byzantine usage, rex was used exclusively for rulers in Latin Europe. For the Hungarian kings in the 11th century, the Byzantines used the Slavic term krales.

The title of "satrap of the Serbs" (Greek: τῶν Σέρβων σατράπην, ό τῶν Σέρβων σατράπης) was used as an archaization by Niketas Choniates and Michael of Thessaloniki for poetic purpose in relation to veliki župan (archizoupanos) Uroš II (r. 1145–1162) and Stefan Nemanja (r. 1166–1196).

=== Knez ===
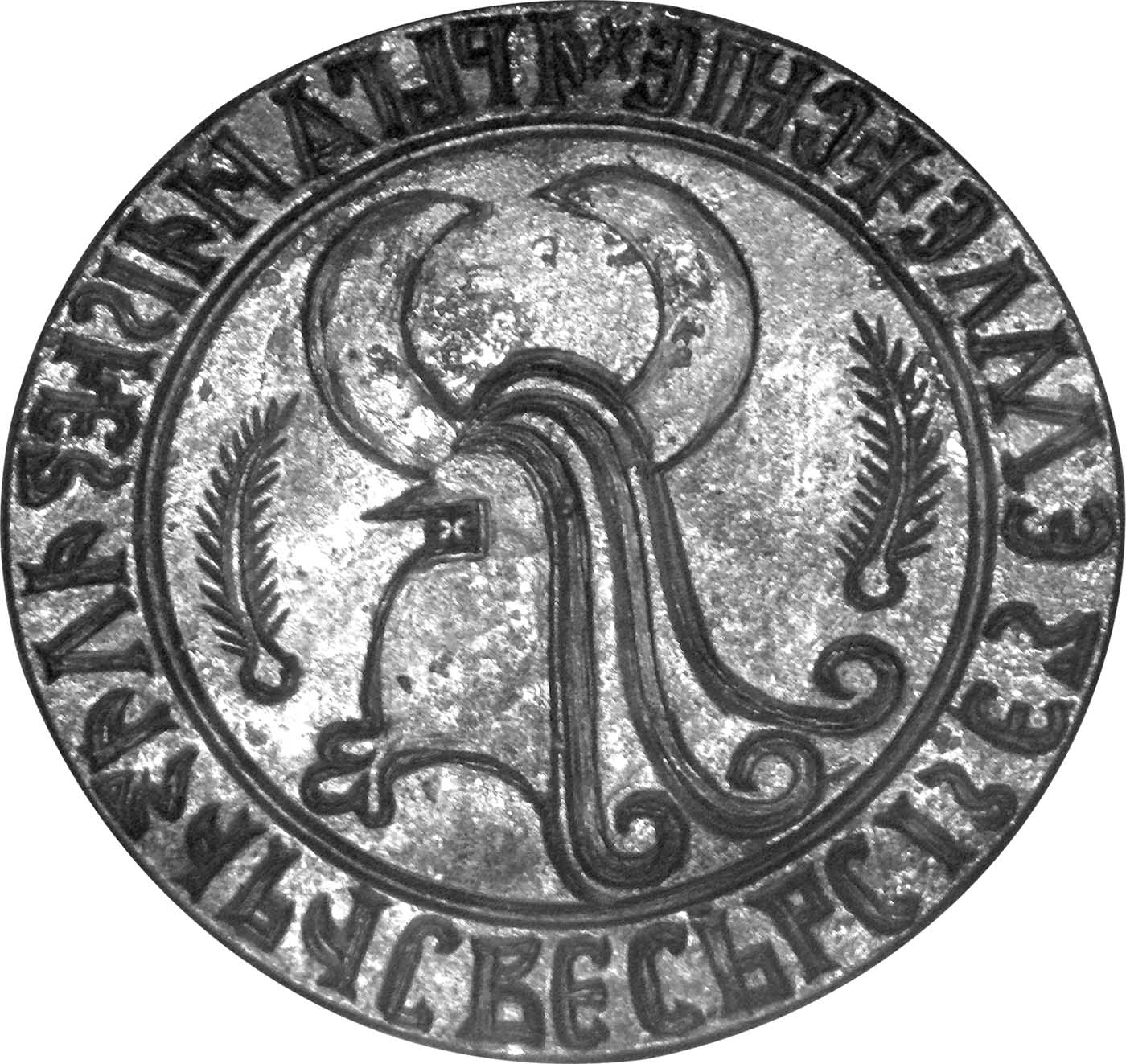
Lazar Hrebeljanović, "Lord, Knez of All Serb Lands".

The word knez is present in all Slavic languages and has an old history; it is a Proto-Slavic loan word from Proto-Germanic kuningaz ("noble"), although there is a theory that it derived from Gothic kuniggs, German könig, meaning "king". The title of knez was used among Serbs and Russians for supreme rulers, and its oldest mentions are in Bulgaria and Russia. It has been attributed as the native regnal title for the Vlastimirović dynasty; in De Administrando Imperio, Serbian ruler Vlastimir is said to have elevated the župan of Travunija to archon, that is, an udeoni knez ("territorial prince", Latin: princeps terrae) subordinated Vlastimir.

Until 1077, the title of knez was used in Duklja as the regnal title, until elevation of Mihailo I as king. Until then, Serbian rulers held the title of knez, according to conclusions of Yugoslav and Serbian medievalists. In Latin documents of the 10th- and early 11th century, the title dux (duke) is found for Serbian rulers. According to the Chronicle of the Priest of Duklja (1300), Constantine Bodin appointed Stefan the knesius of Bosnia, and the legendary Dobroslav's sons were knezes in divided parts of Duklja and Travunia, that is, "territorial princes". With the elevation of veliki župan in Serbia, the title of knez lost its significance as a regnal title. In the Nemanjić era, the title of veliki knez (or knez zemaljski) was given to a small number of people. The title of knez was held by veliki župan Stefan Nemanja's brothers Stracimir and Miroslav, as provincial rulers; the 1186 treaty with Ragusa mentions the brothers (fratrum eius comitis), and besides Nemanja, also knez Miroslav signed in Cyrillic (кнезь Мирославь). Ansbert (1189) calls Nemanja magnus comes and Miroslav comes et princeps. In the 1170s–80s, veliki knez Mihailo ruled Duklja as a Byzantine vassal, and his title rendered magnus comes in Latin (1189). Nemanja appointed his son Vukan the knez of Duklja in 1189, and his title was elevated to veliki knez in 1196. It is uncertain if the title of veliki knez was used in Hum in the 12th century, as only Desa is mentioned as magnus comes in a falsified document; Desa was a udeoni knez ("territorial prince") of Hum and would thus receive the knez title from his brother veliki župan Uroš II (r. 1145–1162). In the first half of the 13th century, the title of veliki knez was adopted in Hum, and showed their high rights in the Nemanjić state; while Miroslav held the title of knez, his son Andrija claimed veliki knez (1237). In the Hilandar charters of Stefan Nemanja (1198) and Stefan Nemanjić (1201), and Life of St. Symeon (1208), the term "land knezes" (Serbian: knezovi zemlje, zemaljski knezovi) is used for provincial governors (rulers of a zemlja, "land"). The knez in the 13th- and 14th centuries was used variously for dynastic members (such as the Hum branch), but also town and market governors and chiefs of shepherding villages, meaning there were three different groups. The title of knez zemaljski (or veliki knez) devaluated and although held by some Nemanjić, such as general Vratko (fl. 1342), in the court it became a noble title below vojvoda, kefalija and some times sevast.

After the Fall of the Serbian Empire in 1371, the supreme title in Serbia became knez or veliki knez, as used by Lazar Hrebeljanović. It had rose to importance among the nobility during the reign of Uroš V (r. 1355–1371), with the powerful provincial rulers such as Vojislav Vojinović and especially Lazar Hrebeljanović. Lazar Hrebeljanović was known in Hungary as "Prince of the Kingdom of Rascia". As he was a pretender to the Nemanjić throne, Lazar added samodržac (autokrator) to his regnal title. In correspondence with the Constantinopolitan Patriarchate (1386), Lazar was called mega knezi (Greek: μέγα κνεζη).

=== Veliki župan ===
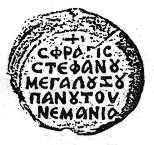
"Stefan megalos zoupanos Nemanja".

The title of župan is known in sources from the 8th century and was used throughout Slavic territory. There are two main theories of its origin, either it was an Avaric word adopted by the Slavs in the Avar Khaganate or it is of Indo-European (Proto-Slavic) origin, as is the territorial term župa. It is the oldest native title for Serbian rulers, and only among Serbs, the župan became part of the regnal title (as in veliki župan). In the beginning, the župan was the representative of tribal leadership, and Byzantine sources speak of "elder župans". The DAI explains how among the South Slavs "Princes (archontas), as they say, these nations had non, but only zoupanous, elders (gerontas), as is the rule in the other Slavonic regions" (Ἂρχοντας δέ, ὢς φασι, ταῦτα τὰ ἔθνη μὴ ἔχειν, πλὴν ζουπάνους γέροντας, καθὼς καὶ αἰ λοιπαὶ Σκλαβηνίαι ἔχουσι τὐπον). With the establishment of Serbian states in the Early Middle Ages, there was the ruler (knez or archon) as supreme leader, and several župan across the country, who held limited authority and territory (župa).

In the 11th- and 12th centuries, a regnal title in Serbia was veliki župan (Serbian: велики жупан), that is, "grand/great župan", rendered in Greek as archizoupanos (άρχιζουπάνος), megazoupanos (μεγαζουπάνος), megalos zoupanos (μεγάλος ζουπάνος), etc., and in Latin as megaiupanus, megas iupanus and magnus iupanus. In Hungarian documents, the title was some times rendered as Latin megas comes. The title originates from župan, and signifies the leader of lesser chieftains titled župan. During the time of the kings of Duklja, the title of veliki župan was held by the rulers in the eastern part of Serbia (the Serbian hinterland, or Raška), but in the 12th century, the holders became more powerful than the kings. The title became hereditary from the late 11th century. Vukan (r. 1083–1112) is mentioned by Anna Komnene as "bringing his relatives and chosen zoupanoi" (τω̃ν ζουπάνων) when swearing fealty to Byzantine emperor Alexios I Komnenos. A legend in the Chronicle of the Priest of Duklja (c. 1300) tells how after the death of "king" Časlav and disintegration of Serbia, no one wanted to take the title of king, and Tichomil instead took the title of "great župan" (Latin: iupanum maiorem), "as he was the head of the rest of the župans in Raška" (caeteris iupanis Rassae).

The title of veliki župan for the monarch is only found among the Serbs, while in one instance John Kinnamos calls a Hungarian commander (and not a ruler) sent to support veliki župan (archizoupanos, Serbion archizoupano) Uroš II (r. 1145–1162) in the revolt against Byzantium with the title of archizoupanos. The title of Uroš II is found in various variations, such as Serbarches (Greek: Σερβάρχης, by Niketas Choniates), archiserbozoupanos (by Theodore Prodromos), iupanius in Rassa (in Chronicle of the Priest of Duklja), Serviam ... comitis magni (in Chronicon Pictum).

In the Hilandar charter (1198–99) issued by Stefan Nemanja, he wrote "God the Merciful determined Greeks as emperors and Hungarians as kings ... and put me as the veliki župan (вєлиєга жоупана)", and signed with a seal in Greek which says "Stefan megalos zoupanos Nemanja" (Στεφάνου μεγάλου ζουπάνου τοῦ Νεμάνια). Nemanja identified the title of veliki župan as that of his ancestors and of Serbia. He had earlier signed as such (Азь вели жоупань) in the Serbian–Ragusan peace treaty (1186). Ansbert (1189) calls Nemanja magnus comes and his brother Miroslav comes et princeps. It was also used by Nemanja's successor, Stefan, in documents such as a 1199 letter to Pope Innocentius III (Latin: Stephanus... magnus iuppanus totius Servye), and a contract with Ragusa (both Serbian: Азь вели жупань Стефань and Latin: Еgo magnus iupanus Stefanus). With the crowning of Stefan as King in 1217, the title of veliki župan lost its rank and declined, especially with the adoption of Byzantine Greek noble titles (despot, kesar, sevastokrator, etc.).

=== King ===
In 1077, Mihailo I received a crown from Pope Gregory VII and Duklja was then known as a kingdom in the West. The Byzantines recognized Stefan Vojislav as exousiastes, a title used for foreign kings. The Byzantine writers of the 11th- and 12th centuries did not use "king" in naming Serbian rulers, but used archon, archegos, exarch, archizoupanos.

In 1217, Stefan was elevated to King (Serbian: kralj). He had requested the crown from Pope Honorius III, calling on the kingly tradition of Duklja. He signed as "Stefan, king and with God, Serb autokrator" (Стефань краль и сь Богомь самодрьжьць срьпски) in a treaty with Ragusa (1220), and "Stefan by God's Grace, Crowned First King of all Serb Lands" (Стефань по Божиеи милости веньчани први краль вьсе Срьбскиıє земле...) in the Žiča Chrysobull (1220). In Latin, the title rex ("king") was used. In the 13th century the version "Great King" was introduced, used by Stefan, likely Stefan Uroš I, Stefan Dečanski and Stefan Dušan.The title of king was used until 1346, when Stefan Dušan was elevated to emperor, car (tsar). The style "the First-Crowned" (prvovenčani) was used in treaties by Stefan's successors mentioning him.

=== Autokrator, Samodržac ===
In 1220, Stefan signed as "Stefan, king and with God, Serb samodržac (autokrator)" (Стефань краль и сь Богомь самодрьжьць срьпски) in a treaty with Ragusa (1220). Autokrator, "self-ruler" in Greek, was the title of the senior Byzantine emperor. The Nemanjić kings adopted it and applied it to themselves in its literal meaning to stress their independence from Byzantium, whose supreme suzerainty they nominally recognized.

Lazar Hrebeljanović used the title samodržac (autokrator) of All Serbs (самодрьжць вьсѣмь Србьлѥмь), and samodržavni (самодрьжавни) as he was a pretender to the Nemanjić throne.

=== Emperor ===
In 1346, Stefan Dušan was elevated to emperor, car (tsar). The Slavic title car is derived from caesar, and entered via Roman usage. Also, the word car (and derivates) was used by Saint Sava and in the Life of St. Symeon (1208) as a synonym for sovereignty, a sovereign ruler, apart from being an imperial title; derivatives were carevati (verb), carski (adjective). The longer title was "Tsar (Emperor) of the Serbs and the Greeks" (Serbian: цар Срба и Грка) and "Basileus (Emperor) and autocrat of Serbia and Rhomania" (Bασιλεὺς καὶ αὐτoκράτωρ Σερβίας καὶ Ῥωμανίας). After Dušan's death in 1355, his son and successor Uroš V (r. 1355–1371), and half-brother who governed Thessaly and Epirus Simeon Uroš, used the imperial title. Simeon Uroš's successor Jovan Uroš also claimed the title until taking vows (1373). After 1371, the supreme title was knez or veliki knez, as used by Lazar Hrebeljanović.

=== Despot ===
In 1402, Stefan Lazarević received the title of despot (Greek: δεσπότης, despotes) by emperor John VII Palaiologos, and it was used in the Serbian Despotate until its fall in 1459. Stefan signed himself "By God's Grace, Lord of All Serbs, Despot Stefan" (Мiлостıю Божiєю Господинь всємь Срьблıємь дєпоть Стєфань). Foreign documents call him "Lord, Despot of Sclavonia" (dominus despotus Sclavoniae), "Lord, Despot, Duke of Rascia" (dominus despotus dux (Rassie-Raxie)), "Lord, Despot of [the Kingdom of] Rascia" (dominus despotus (regni) Rascie). Between 1459 and 1537, the title "Despot of Serbia" was given by the Hungarian kings to the most notable Serb nobility that settled in Hungary and fought against the Ottoman Empire as Hungarian vassals.

The rulers of the Serbian Despotate were often mentioned as Lord of the Serbs, Despot. Used after 1402. Initially Despot was a honorific title of Byzantine origin (δεσπότης, despotes), used alongside that of the Lord of the Serbs, but eventually it became synonymous with the Serbian monarchy, as well as its claimants in exile.

=== Honorifics ===
- The terms gospodin and gospodar (Latin: dominus) was used by the Serbian royalty and nobility. In 1205, Stefan signed as gospodin ("lord") in a treaty with Ragusa. The knez Lazar Hrebeljanović added samodržavni gospodin (самодрьжавьныи господинь, self-ruling gospodin) to his regnal title as he was a pretender to the Nemanjić throne. Stefan Lazarević signed himself "By God's Grace, Lord of All Serbs, Despot Stefan" (Мiлостıю Божiєю Господинь всємь Срьблıємь дєпоть Стєфань), while foreign documents call him dominus, despotus and dux.
- The name Stefan was adopted in the Nemanjić dynasty which ruled the Serb lands between ca. 1166 up to 1371. All Serbian rulers after Stefan Nemanjić added the name Stefan before their birth names after ascending the throne as a manner of honoring the first ruler of their dynasty, Stefan Nemanja. The name Stefan is derived from Greek stephanos, meaning crowned with wreath.

== Modern ==
=== Vožd ===
The first year of the First Serbian Uprising saw supreme military control of territory in the hands of Karađorđe, which led to other military leaders wanting to limit his power. In response, the Governing Council (Praviteljstvujušči Sovjet) was established in 1805, Laws passed by the Governing Council and People's Assembly (Narodna Skupština) in October–November 1805 represented the first constitutional acts establishing the council as the executive institution. The People's Assembly, made up of community leaders (owing to their reputation and position), and not electees, gathered to decide on important matters such as political and military issues. Karađorđe became Assembly chairman (Serbian: Председатељ верховни Совјета народна), being the commanding general with certain diplomatic, administrative and judicial functions. The second Constitutional Act was adopted by the Assembly at Belgrade in 1808, which recognized Karađorđe as hereditary "leader" (предводитељ/predvoditelj) and the council as the judicial institution. Although the Constitution obliged cooperation between Karađorđe and the council, some voivodes still wanted to limit his powers. The third Act came in 1811 with the intention to end the attempts of dissenting commanders, Karađorđe receiving the title of "Vožd" (again, hereditary) and some voivodes swearing oath first to him (as a monarch) and then the "fatherland", promising also to bring any rival to court. Karađorđe in turn promised to lead the people justly, stay committed to the Russian alliance, rule alongside the Council which held judicial power, and not permit the abuse of power. As the president of the council, he could nominate ministers and other members. Karađorđe held almost unlimited power as head of state and government.

=== Prince ===
- "Prince of Serbia" (see Principality of Serbia), in use 1817–82

=== King ===
- "King of Serbia" (see Kingdom of Serbia), in use 1882–1918
- "King of Serbs, Croats and Slovenes" (see Kingdom of Serbs, Croats and Slovenes), in use 1918–29
- "King of Yugoslavia" (see Kingdom of Yugoslavia), in use 1929–45

== See also ==
- List of Serbian monarchs
- Serbian noble titles

== Annotations ==
1. The ancient name of the Triballi was used interchangeably with the Serb ethnonym to describe the Serbs, as Skylitzes had the literary ambition in line with other Byzantine authors who avoided using "barbarian" names and instead used the names of ancient peoples. Other names used for Serbia and the Serbs were Dalmatia–Dalmatians, Illyria, Dacia–Dacians.

== Sources ==
- Blagojević, Miloš (2001). Државна управа у српским средњовековним земљама [State administration in the Serb medieval lands] (Second ed.). Službeni list SRJ. ISBN 9788635504971.
- Blagojević, Miloš (2004). "Велики кнез и земаљски кнез" [Le grand prince et le prince territorial]. Зборник радова Византолошког института (41). Византолошки институт: 293–318. doi:10.2298/zrvi0441293b. ISSN 0584-9888.
- Ćirković, Sima; Mihaljčić, Rade (1999). Лексикон српског средњег века (PDF) (in Serbian). Knowledge. ISBN 9788683233014.
- Dinić, Mihailo (1958). "Srpska vladarska titula za vreme Carstva". Зборник радова Византолошког института (5). Византолошки институт: 9–17.
- Dinić, Mihailo (1951). "Dušanova carska titula u očima savremenika". Zbornik u čast šeste stogodišnjice Zakonika cara Dušana. Belgrade: SAN: 87–118.
- Ferjančić, Božidar (1971). "Михаило Солунски". Византијски извори за историју народа Југославије, том IV. IV. Византолошки институт: 185–193.
- Ferluga, J. (1966). "Јован Скилица". Византијски извори за историју народа Југославије, том III. III. Византолошки институт: 51–172.
- Hekić, Benjamin (2021). "Sigilografski obrasci srpskih despota posle 1459: od srpskih suverena do ugarskih magnata". Serbian Studies Research. 12 (1): 15–45.
- Jokanović, Ivan (2022). "Position of the Head of State in Serbia in the XIXth and XXth Centuries". Romanian Journal of Legal History. 2 (1).
- Kalić, Jovanka (1971a). "Јован Кинам" [Ioannis Kinnamos]. Византијски извори за историју народа Југославије, том IV. IV. Византолошки институт: 1–106.
- Kalić, Jovanka (1971b). "Никита Хонијат" [Niketas Choniates]. Византијски извори за историју народа Југославије, том IV. IV. Византолошки институт: 107–172.
- Komatina, Predrag (2011). "Vizantijska titula Konstantina Bodina" [The byzantine title of Constantine Bodin]. Зборник радова Византолошког института (48). Византолошки институт: 61–76. doi:10.2298/zrvi1148061k. ISSN 0584-9888.
- Komatina, Predrag (2012). "Србија и Дукља у делу Јована Скилице" [Serbia and Dioclea in the work of John Scylitzes]. Зборник радова Византолошког института (49). National Library of Serbia: 159–186. doi:10.2298/zrvi1249159k. ISSN 0584-9888.
- Komatina, Ivana (2015). "Srpski vladari u Aleksijadi - hronološki okviri delovanja" [Serbian rulers in the Alexiad - some chronological notes] (PDF). Зборник радова Византолошког института. LII.
- Krekić, B. (1966). "Ана Комнина". Византијски извори за историју народа Југославије, том III. III. Византолошки институт: 367–394.
- Maksimović, Ljubomir (1970). "Грци и Романија у српској владарској титули". Зборник радова Византолошког института. 12. Византолошки институт.
- Maksimović, Ljubomir (1998). "Српска царска титула". Глас САНУ. 384.
- Mandić, Svetislav (1986). Velika gospoda sve srpske zemlje i drugi prosopografski prilozi. Srpska književna zadruga. ISBN 9788637900122.
- Marjanović-Dušanić, Smilja (1997). Vladarska ideologija Nemanjića: diplomatička studija. Srpska književna zadruga. ISBN 9788637906377.
- Miklosich, Franz (1858). Monumenta Serbica spectantia historiam Serbiae, Bosnae, Ragusii. Vienna: apud Guilelmum Braumüller.
- Mošin, V. (1975) [1971], "Самодржавни Стефан кнез Лазар и традиција немањићког суверенитета од Марице до Косова", О кнезу Лазару: научни скуп у Крушевцу, 1971., Филозофски факултет. Одељење за историју уметности, Београд, OCLC 463634995
- Ostrogorsky, George (1935). "Avtokrator i Samodržac: prilog za istoriju vladalačke titulature u Vizantiji i u južnih Slovena". Glas Srpske Kraljevske Akademije (CLXIV). Srpska kraljevska akademija: 95–187.
- Pirivatrić, Srđan (2011). "Manuel i Komnenos, „Carski san" and „Samodržci oblasti srpskog prestola"". Зборник радова Византолошког института (48). National Library of Serbia: 89–118. doi:10.2298/zrvi1148089p. ISSN 0584-9888.
- Radojčić, B. (1966). "Нићифор Вријеније". Византијски извори за историју народа Југославије, том III. III. Византолошки институт: 235–244.
- Šarkić, Srđan (2012). "Владарске титуле у средњовековној Србији" [Monarch's titles in Mediaeval Serbia] (PDF). Зборник радова Правног факултета у Новом Саду. 46 (2): 23–35.
