= Mihailo Stevanović =

Mihailo Stevanović may refer to:

- Mihailo Stevanović (linguist) (1903–2001), Serbian linguist
- Mihailo Stevanović (footballer) (born 2002), Serbian footballer
