= Kaznac =

Kaznac (Serbian Cyrillic: казнац) was a court title of the state employee in medieval Bosnia and Serbia who was in charge for the treasury in the territory under his jurisdiction — kaznačina (казначина). The name of the title is derived from Serbo-Croatian word kazna (English: penalty). The kaznac was a financial-taxation service, translated into Latin camerarius (itself rendered "chamberlain").

In the Dečani chrysobulls, King Stefan Dečanski (r. 1321–1331) mentioned that the court dignitaries present at the Dečani assembly were the kaznac, tepčija, vojvoda, sluga and stavilac.

The title of veliki kaznac (велики казнац, "grand kaznac") was later transformed into protovestijar.

== List of title holders ==
=== Serbia ===
- Vlado, served between 1274 and 1279
- Prvoslav Radojević (fl. 1280), served Helen of Anjou.
- Mrnjan (fl. 1288), served Helen of Anjou at the court at Trebinje.
- Miroslav (fl. 1306), kaznac, served Stefan Milutin.
- Jovan Dragoslav (fl. 1300–15), kaznac (1300), then veliki kaznac (1315), served Stefan Milutin.
- Dmitar, served Stefan Milutin and Stefan Dečanski (r. 1321–31)
- Baldovin (fl. 1325–33), served Stefan Dečanski (r. 1321–31)
- Gradislav Borilović, served Stefan Dušan.
- Pribac, served Stefan Dušan (r. 1331–55).
- Bogdan (fl. 1363), kaznac in the service of Emperor Uroš V
- Tolislav

=== Bosnia ===
- Krasoje, served around 1378 as the last known kaznac of Bosnia and the founder of noble family Kresojevic.

== See also ==
- Serbian noble titles in the Middle Ages

== Sources ==
- Blagojević, Miloš (2001). Državna uprava u srpskim srednjovekovnim zemljama (in Serbian). Službeni list SRJ. ISBN 9788635504971.
- Ćirković, Sima; Mihaljčić, Rade (1999). Лексикон српског средњег века (in Serbian). Knowledge. ISBN 9788683233014.
- Dinić, Mihailo; Ćirković, Sima (1978). Српске земље у средњем веку: историјско-географске студије (in Serbian). Српска књижевна задруга.
- Purković, Miodrag (1985). Srpska kultura srednjega veka (in Serbian). Izd. Srpske pravoslavne eparhije za zapadnu Evropu.
