= Nikola Buća =

Serbian nobleman

- protovestijar (protovestiarios) (Note: As Fine states in The Late Medieval Balkans: A Critical Survey from the Late Twelfth Century to the Ottoman Conquest: "The chief financial official responsible for the state treasury and its income was the protovestijar. This position was regularly held by a merchant from Kotor who understood financial management and bookkeeping. Both protovestijars and logothetes were used as diplomats, the protovestijars in particular being sent west, for as citizens of Kotor they knew Italian and Latin.") financial minister of Serbia милостьник протовистіар Никола
- Nikola Buća, at coronation of Emperor Dušan. Detail from the artwork "Coronation of Emperor Dušan" (1900), by Paja Jovanović.
- Tenure: fl. 1336-1350
- Predecessor: ?
- Successor: Grubo
- Other titles: komornik (comes camerarius) (Note: The title comes camerarius is also rendered as veliki kaznac (Great kaznac).)
- Born: Kotor, Serbian Kingdom (modern Montenegro)
- Died: 1354
- Noble family: Buća
- Spouses: Dobra, sister of Klement Gučetić
- Issue: Bijela; Bika
- Occupation: Merchant

Nikola Buća (Serbian Cyrillic: Никола Бућа; (Note: His name in Serbo-Croatian is Nikola Buća (Никола Бућа) - his full name was Nikola Petrov Buća. In Italian Niccolò Bucchia. For other spellings of his surname, see Buća noble family.) fl. 1325-1350) was a Serbian nobleman, merchant from Kotor, and protovestijar (financial manager) in the service of King Stephen Uroš III Dečanski of Serbia (r. 1321-1331) and Emperor Stephen Dušan the Mighty (r. 1331-1355).

Emperor Stephen Dušan asked Buća for advice in every major question, as he was his most reliable advisor, and Buća remained in the service of the Emperor until his death.

== Life ==
Nikola was part of the Buća noble family of Kotor, in the Serbian Kingdom (modern Montenegro). The first known Buća was Tripe Mihov (Trifun Buća, Трифун Бућа). Kotoran families held high offices in the Serbian court, and the most notable was the Buča family, while the most notable individual was Nikola Buća. His brother was Mihajlo Buća, also a diplomat of Stephen Dušan, and his nephew was Trifun Mihajlov Buća. Nikola and Toma Pavlov, another notable Kotoran, traded in salt.

Nikola Buća along with Metropolitan of Prizren Arsenije, kaznac Baldovin, vojvoda Gradislav, župan Vratko, knez Grgur Kurjaković, stavilac Miloš (title mentioned for the first time), vojvoda Dejan Manjak, Gradislav Sušenica, and more, signed the letter issued by Stephen Uroš III, dated 22 January 1325, for the sale of some maritime possessions to the Republic of Ragusa. The possessions were Ston and Pelješac, which the Ragusans earlier had tried to buy through talks with Tripe Mihov.

On 15 July 1326, King Stephen Uroš III confirmed that Andrija Peštić, Nikola Buća and Grubeta had paid their bills for some royal markets which they had leased. Buća had paid several people to gain control of business in Kotor; On 1 December 1326, he entrusted Ilija, the nephew of Bratoslav Dusinj of Ragusa, with 700 perpers, and then he personally invested in goods of Kotor which he sold in Serbia.

In January 1336, Nikola and his brother Mihajlo became Ragusan citizens, and received the notable right of counselor (većnik). Their sons also received Ragusan citizenship. The granting of citizenship was a result of Buća's involvement in the sale. The most notable nobles of King Stephen Dušan (the velikaši, "great ones") received up to 1000 ducats, and Nikola Buća was given a plot of land in Ragusa itself, and a part of Ston. The city of Ragusa (modern Dubrovnik) had highly enriched itself during the rule of Emperor Stephen Dušan, who had constantly granted it gifts and delegations.

There are sources saying that the Kotoran nobles received fame during the reign of King Stephen Uroš III, when they, under the command of Nikola Buća, captured the Bulgarian flag and cross during the Battle of Velbužd (1330). He probably had supported Dušan's overthrow of his father, King Uroš III, in 1331.

In 1344, he asked permission to build the Dominican Monastery of St. Nicholas in Kotor.

Buća held the title komornik (In latin documents "comes camerarius"), prior to the crowning of Stephen Dušan as Emperor, at which time the Serbian nobility and clergy were elevated in titles - Buća was elevated to protovestijar. The protovestijar was the chief financial official. Buća had a number of associates and business partners in his near relatives. The power of the protovestijar is best testified by the proverb: "Car da – al Buća ne da" (The Emperor gives, but Buća does not).

Buća accompanied Emperor Dušan on his visits to Dubrovnik and Kotor, in 1350. He died in 1354.

His nephew Trifun Mihajlov Buća (fl. 1357), one of the most known and important persons in his time, served Emperor Dušan's successor Uroš V as protovestijar.

== Family ==
Nikola Buća married Dobra Gučetić, sister of Klement. They had following issue:

- daughter, Bijela, married to Maro Goca (Gučetić).
- daughter, Bika, married Marin Gučetić in 1349, in exchange for 1000 ducats, 100 aksađa gold and other equipment.

Court offices
Preceded by ? as ?	protovestijar of the Serbian Empire (minister of finance); 1346-1354	Succeeded by Grubo
