= Osanna of Cattaro =

Dominican visionary and anchoress (1493–1565)

Blessed Osanna of Cattaro TOSD
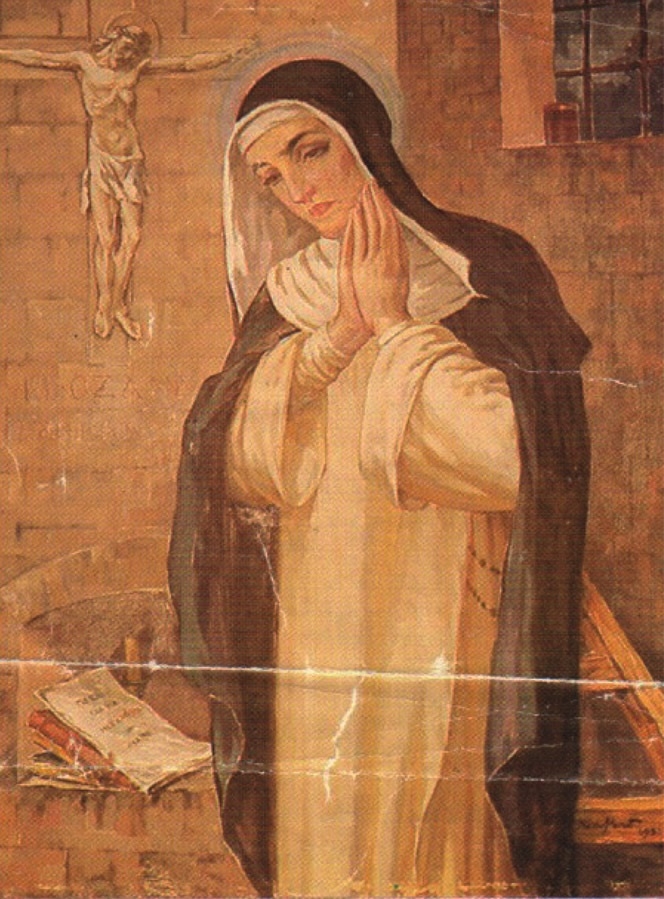

Virgin
- Born: Jovana Kosić; 25 November 1493; Releza, Principality of Zeta
- Died: 27 April 1565 (aged 71); Cattaro, Republic of Venice
- Venerated in: Roman Catholic Church
- Beatified: 21 December 1927 (cultus confirmed), 1934 (beatified), Saint Peter's Basilica, Rome by Pope Pius XI
- Feast: 27 April

Osanna of Cattaro, TOSD (Serbian: Озана Которска, romanized: Ozana Kotorska; born Jovana Kosić; 25 November 1493 – 27 April 1565) was a Catholic visionary and anchoress from Cattaro, Montenegro. She was a convert from Orthodoxy and was of Serbian descent. She became a Dominican tertiary and was first venerated in Kotor. She was later beatified in 1934.

== Life ==
Osanna was born Jovana Kosić in the village of Releza in Zeta to an Eastern Orthodox priestly family named Kosić and was baptized "Jovana" in that tradition. Her father was Fr Pero Kosić and her uncle was Marko Kosić, a monk who later became Eastern Orthodox Bishop of Zeta. Her grandfather Aleksa Kosić and her great grandfather Đuro Kosić were also Orthodox priests.

Kosić was a shepherdess in her youth, and developed the habit of spending her solitary hours in prayer. A story says that one day while watching the flocks, she saw a child lying asleep on the grass. Attracted by its beauty, she went to pick up the baby, but it disappeared, leaving Kosić with a feeling of great loneliness.

Kosić continued to witness these apparitions. When she was 14 years old, her visions began to be followed by an odd desire to travel to the coastal Venetian town of Cattaro in Albania Veneta (Bay of Kotor, modern-day Montenegro), where she felt she could pray better. Her mother did not understand, and grudgingly arranged a position for her as a servant to the wealthy Catholic Buća family, who allowed the girl as much time as she wished for church visits. In Cattaro, Kosić abandoned Eastern Orthodoxy and converted to Catholicism, talking the baptismal name Katarina. She learned to read and write during her free time. She read religious books in both Latin and Italian, especially the Bible.

In her late teens, Kosić felt a call to live the life of an anchoress. Though she was considered very young for such a calling, her spiritual director had her walled up in a cell built near Saint Bartholomew's church in Cattaro. It had a window through which she could hear Mass, and another window to which people would occasionally come to ask for prayers or give food. Kosić made the customary promises of stability and the door was sealed.

After an earthquake destroyed her first hermitage, she moved to a cell at Saint Paul's church, and became a Dominican tertiary, taking the name Osanna in memory of Blessed Osanna of Mantua. She would follow the Dominican rule for the last 52 years of her life. A group of Dominican sisters took up residence near her, consulting her for guidance, and came to consider her their leader. Osanna soon had so many followers that a convent was founded for them.

In her tiny cell, it is said that Osanna had many visions. These included the Christ as an infant, the Blessed Virgin Mary, and several saints. Once, it is said, the Devil appeared to her in the form of the Blessed Virgin and told her to modify her penances. By obedience to her confessor, Osanna reportedly managed to penetrate this disguise.

A convent of sisters founded at Cattaro regarded her as their foundress because of her prayers, although she never actually saw the place. When the city was attacked on 9 August 1539 by Khair ad-Din Barbarossa, and Cattaro was threatened, the citizens of Cattaro ran to her for help. They credited their deliverance to her prayers and counsel. Later, her prayers were credited to saving them from the plague.

== Veneration ==
The incorrupt body of Osanna was kept in the Church of St. Paul until 1807, when the French Army converted the church into a warehouse. Her body was then brought to the Church of St. Mary. The people of Kotor venerated her as a saint. In 1905, the process for her beatification began in Kotor and was successfully completed in Rome. In 1927, Pope Pius XI approved her cultus, and in 1934, she was beatified.

Over the course of her life, the people of Kotor came to call her "the trumpet of the Holy Spirit" and the "teacher of mysticism". People from all walks of life came to her for advice, and she interceded particularly for peace in the town and among feuding families. Therefore, she was also called "the virgin reconciler" and the "angel of peace".
