= Karaljuk =

Novak
- Military career
- Allegiance: Serbian Despotate
- Service years: fl. 1404–10
- Nickname: Karaljuk
- Unit: Toplica detachment

Novak (Serbian Cyrillic: Новак; fl. 1404–10), known as Karaljuk (Караљук), was a Serbian nobleman in the service of Despot Stefan Lazarević (r. 1402–1427), who was known to have fought a guerilla war against the Ottomans that brought great damage to Ottoman property. Despot Stefan was known to have served Hungarian king Sigismund, and at the same time having an ostensibly friendly relation with the Ottoman prince Süleyman Çelebi. This political game was not understood by some of the Serbian nobility, who irreverently attacked the Ottomans; one such case was that of Novak Karaljuk.

Karaljuk was mentioned by chronicler Constantine of Kostenets (fl. 1427–31) in relation to the war between Stefan and his brother Vuk (d. 1410). He hailed from "one of the best families", and had even before the division of land between the Lazarević brothers (after the Battle of Kosovo) been appointed to the service of Despot Stefan. He commanded a detachment of the Serbian army in Toplica, and led a guerrilla war against the Ottomans. He made incursions into Ottoman territory, and notably, in 1404, during a passage of the Ottoman army of Süleyman through Serbia (via Toplica), he attacked the rear portion of the Ottoman field army from the mountains and captured the whole of the army's treasury, which he took to the Despot in Kruševac. As the passage had been allowed, Stefan himself returned the loot to the Ottomans; when asked to hand over Karaljuk, he told him that this was a man who lived in the forests (like a hajduk), and to whom nothing could be done; the Despot returned the loot, but did not hand over Karaljuk (he did not want to, or perhaps was unable to do so). Revolts against the Ottomans were suppressed, and the brothers' conflict ended with division of the lands. Süleyman returned to Anatolia in the summer of 1405.

According to Buda Ilić's assessment, Karaljuk could not have been a real hajduk (brigand), as he returned the loot to Despot Stefan, nor could he have been a real rebel against the central (Ottoman) government. He was an important nobleman, as he must have had great military strength in order to manage capture the treasury of the Ottoman main army. It seems that he steadily believed in the need and possibility to expel the Ottomans from Serbia, and wanted to show this to Despot Stefan through his efforts.

Historian Miodrag Purković assumed that Novak Karaljuk was the same as vojvoda Novak who was among the Serbian signatories of the peace treaty with the Republic of Venice in Sveti Srdj on 12 August 1423. Historian Srđan Rudić connected him to the "Novak Debeljić" from epic poetry, and the Debeljić family found in the Illyrian Armorials. The known hajduk character of Stari Novak ("Old Novak") in Serbian epic poetry is a merger of several individuals in Serbian history, including 14th-century Novak Grebostrek, 15th-century Karaljuk, and 16th-century Starina (Baba) Novak. The novel Vitez Novak Karaljuk ("Knight Novak Karaljuk") by Slobodan Stojanović was published in 1949 and re-published in 2013.

== Annotations ==
1. In Constantine's biography, he is known as "Karaljuk" in the text, while "Novak" is annoted beside the text.

== Sources ==
- Bogdanović, Dimitrije; Mihaljčić, Rade; Ćirković, Sima; Kalić, Jovanka; Kovačević-Kojić, Desanka; Blagojević, Miloš; Babić-Đorđević, Gordana; Đurić, Vojislav J.; Spremić, Momčilo; Božić, Ivan; Pantić, Miroslav; Ivić, Pavle (1982). Kalić, Jovanka (ed.). Историја српског народа: Доба борби за очување и обнову државе (1371–1537). Belgrade: Srpska književna zadruga.
  - Kalić, Jovanka (1982b). "Немирно доба". Историја српског народа: Доба борби за очување и обнову државе (1371–1537). pp. 75–87.
- Ilić, Buda (1971). Istorija Kruševca: 1371-1941. Istorijski arhiv Kruševac. p. 45.
- Kostić, Dragutin (1937). Tumačenja druge knjige srpskih narodnih pjesama Vuka St. Karadžića: dodatak četvrtom državnom izdanju. Državna Štamparija. p. 116.
- Novaković, Stojan (1893). Srbi i turci XIV i XV veka: istorijske studije o prvim borbama s najezdom turskom pre i posle boja na Kosovu. Štampano u Državnoj štampariji.
- Rudić, Srđan (2006). Властела Илирског грбовника [The Nobility of the Illyric Coat of Arms]. Istorijski institut Beograd. p. 131. ISBN 978-86-7743-055-9.
- Kastritsis, Dimitris J. (2007). The Sons of Bayezid: Empire Building and Representation in the Ottoman Civil War of 1402-1413. BRILL. pp. 126–. ISBN 978-90-04-15836-8.
