= Miroslav (kaznac) =

Serbian nobleman

- kaznac
- Born: Kingdom of Serbia
- Died: after 1306

Miroslav (Serbian Cyrillic: Мирослав; fl. 1305–06) was a Serbian nobleman with the title of kaznac, serving King Stefan Milutin (r. 1282–1321). He was among the witnesses mentioned in the charter issued to the Ratac Monastery by Milutin in 1306, alongside noblemen čelnik Branko and župan Vladislav, holding the title of kaznac. Miroslav held the surroundings of Vranje, while tepčija Kuzma held the župa of Vranje.

== Sources ==
- Blagojević, Miloš (2001). Državna uprava u srpskim srednjovekovnim zemljama. Službeni list SRJ. ISBN 9788635504971.

Court offices
Preceded by Mrnjan as serving Stefan Uroš I	kaznac of King Stefan Milutin fl. 1305–06; Served alongside: Jovan Dragoslav (fl. 1300)	Succeeded by Jovan Dragoslav as veliki kaznac
