= Buća =

Noble family

Bučić Bucchia (see Name)
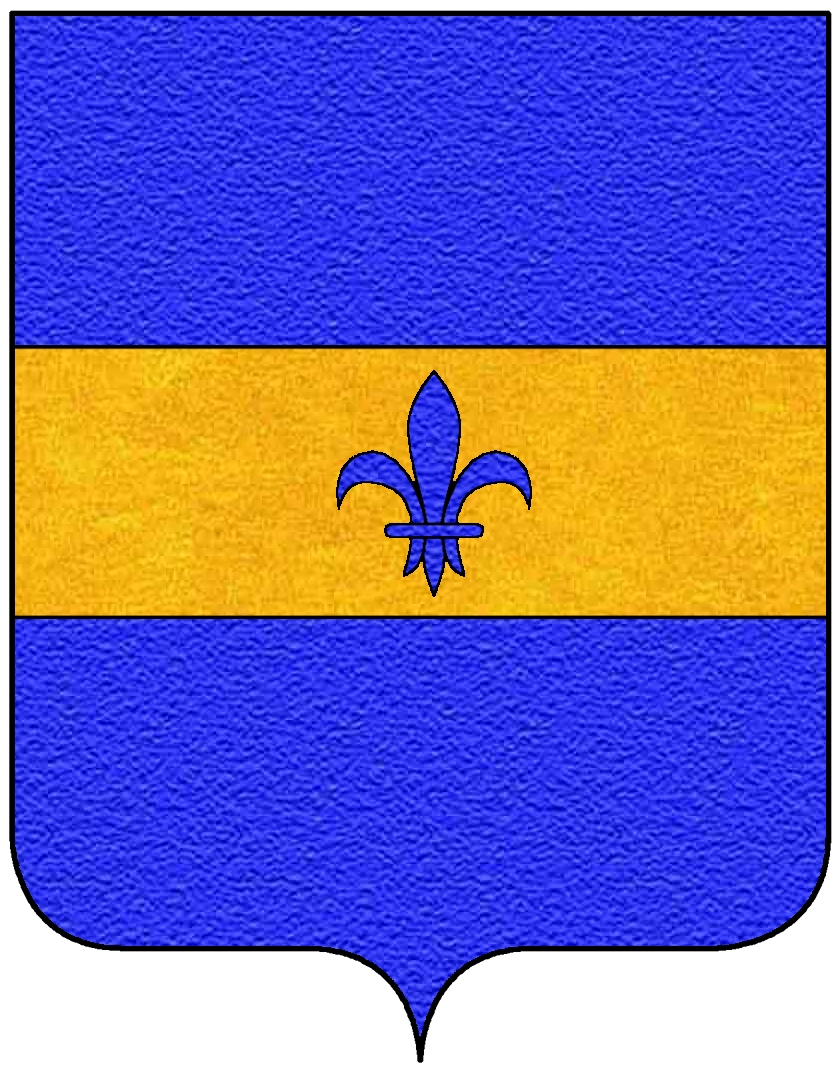
- Country: Kingdom of Serbia, Serbian Empire and Republic of Ragusa
- Founded: before 1308 (Serbian nobility); January 1336 (Ragusan nobility)
- Dissolution: 19th century
- Cadet branches: House of Drago-Bučić

The House of Buća (Serbian Cyrillic: Бућа; in Italian Bucchia) was an old Serbian noble family that served the Republic of Ragusa, and one of the most important families to come out of Kotor. A cadet branch was admitted to the nobility of the Republic of Ragusa, another branch moved instead to Šibenik.

== Name ==
The family is known in Serbian sources as Buća,(Cyrillic: Бућа) but also as Bućić or Bučić. In Latin, Italian and French sources they are known in a variety of forms, mostly Bucchia or de Bucchia, but also Bucchich, Buchia, Buche, Buchi, Buchie, de Bucha, de Buchia, de Bucho, de Buça, Boce o Buca. Other versions found in Serbo-Croatian include Buča and Bućin.

== History ==
=== Origin and early history ===
This painting by the Vittore Carpaccio workshop was commissioned by the Buća family in the early 16th century. It depicts the moment when Montenegro’s (Principality of Zeta) royal power shifted from the Crnojević dynasty to the Metropolitans of Cetinje

The family name seems to derive from the medieval name Buchius or Bucchius reported both in Dalmatia and earlier in various Italian locations. The first Bučić to be in the archives is a Jakov Bučić present in Kotor in 1186.

=== Service in Serbia ===
The first known Buća was Tripe Mihov (Trifun Buća, Трифун Бућа). Kotoran families held high offices in the Serbian court, and the most notable was the Buča family, while the most notable individual was Nikola Buća. Nikola and Toma Pavlov, another notable Kotoran, traded in salt.

As trusted diplomats in the service of the Serbian Nemanjić dynasty, members of the Buća family traveled to the court of the House of Valois. Through these high-level embassies, they established a direct connection with the French royal house, which subsequently granted them the prestigious right to bear the fleur-de-lis on their family coat of arms. According to historical records, this right was earned through high-level diplomatic missions undertaken by Trifun Buća during his embassy to Charles, Count of Valois in 1308 and later by Nikola Buća during a mission to the court of John II of France in 1351. As a result of this prestigious concession, the blue lily on a golden field (azure, a fleur-de-lis or) became a central and defining element of the Buća family's coat of arms.

The Buća were among the wealthiest and most powerful of Kotor (Kingdom of Serbia and Serbian Empire). Founded later with the House of Drago, it gave rise to one of the most important families in the region: the House of Drago-Bučić.

=== Service in the Republic of Ragusa ===
A branch of the family moved to Šibenik in 1449, while another branch had earlier moved to Dubrovnik in the 14th century. The latter, between 1440 and 1640 counted 30 members of the Great Council, representing 1.36% of total. In these two hundred years, they also got 27 senatorial positions (1.36%), five Rectors of the Republic (0.21%), five members of the Minor Council (0.23%), but were never Guards Justice.

=== Recent history ===
Kotoran branch became extinct in the 17th century, the Dubrovnik in the 19th century, but the Šibenik branch still survives in Italy, precisely in Milan and Parma, respectively in the Bucchich and Peracchia - Bucchich families.

== Members ==
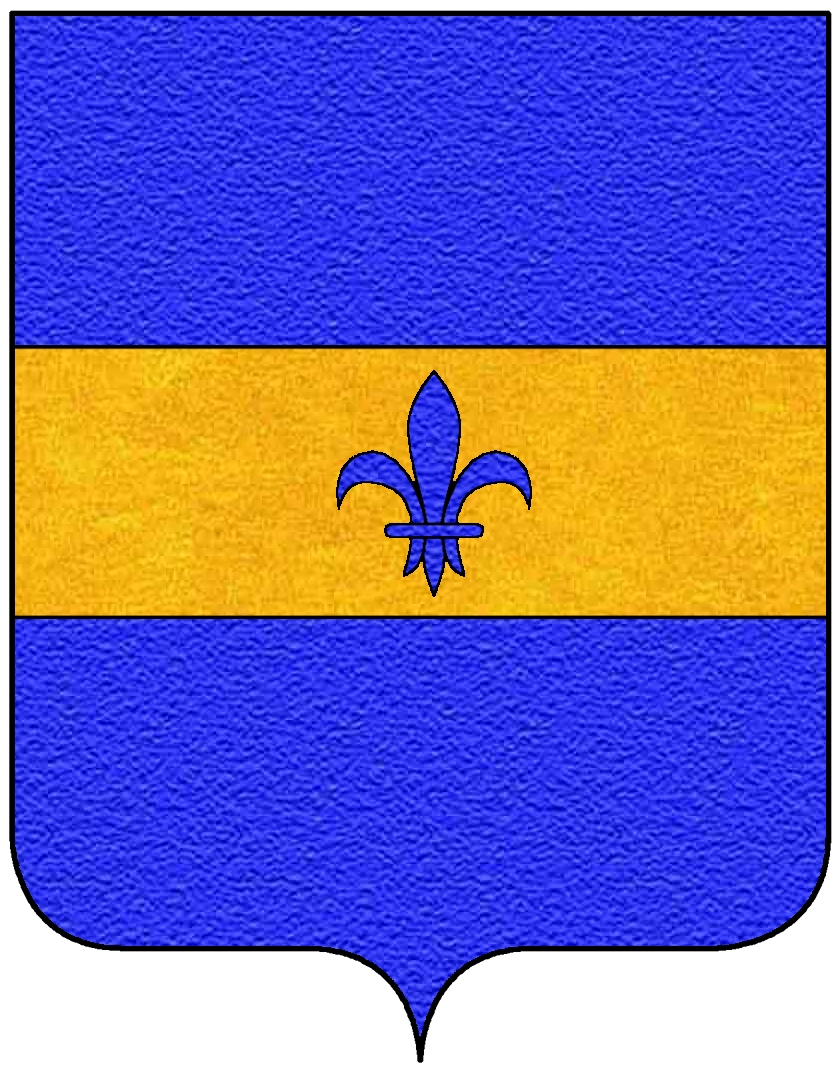

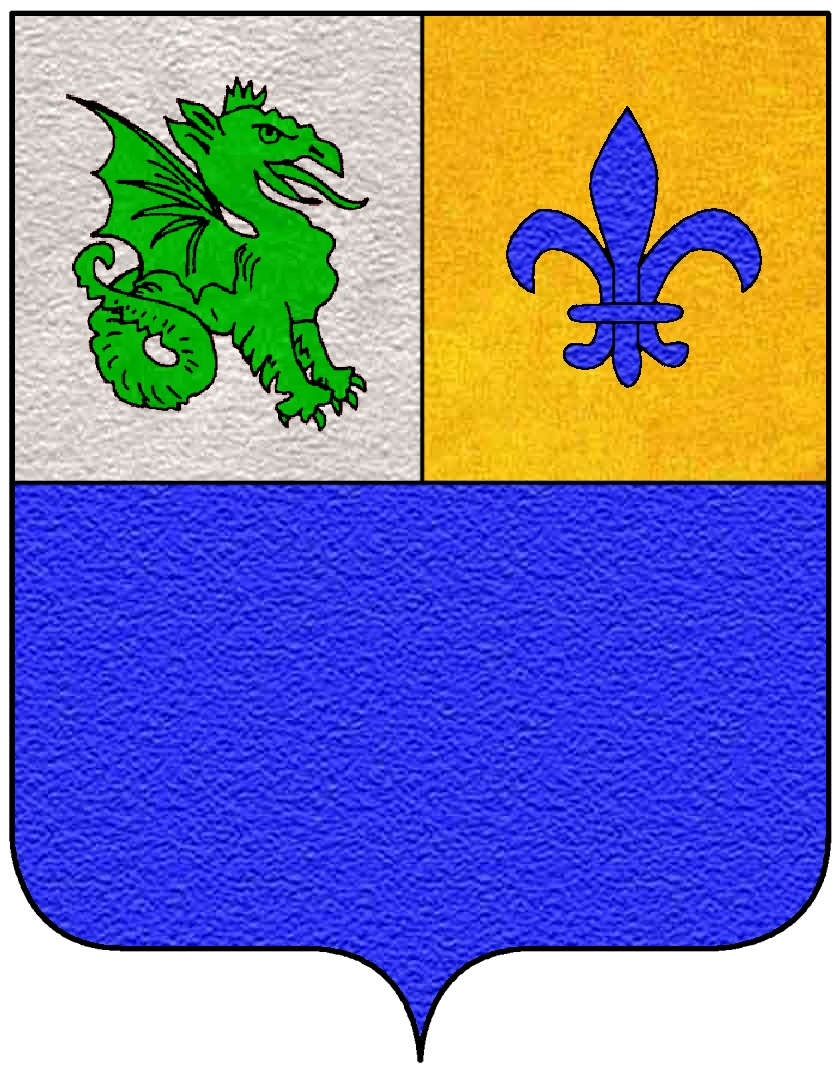

Coats-of-arms of House of Bučić and House of Drago-Bučić

- Nikola Buća (14th century), protovestiarios of Serbian Emperor Stephen Dušan (r. 1331-1355). It seems he was the first member of the family to be admitted to the Ragusan nobility, as requested by the Emperor.
- Jeronim Bučić (16th century) - From Kotor, was Bishop of local diocese since 1581. He edited an adaptation of The Life of St. Tryphon, adding four hymns.
- Vincenc and Dominik Bučić (16th century) - Brothers from Kotor, both Dominicans, were popular theologians, leaving several published and unpublished writings. The second was the confessor of Blessed Osanna of Cattaro and General Vicar for Dalmatia.
- Vincenc Bučić (17th century) - Bishop of Kotor from 1622 to 1656.
- Gregorio Bucchich (Grgur Bučić) (1829 - 1911) - Born on the island of Hvar, he was a famous Croatian naturalist, in particular an expert in ichthyology and meteorology. He was the discoverer of the gobius bucchichi and was the first director of the meteorological station on the island of Hvar.

== See also ==
- Republic of Ragusa
- Dalmatia
- Kotor
- Dubrovnik
- Post-Roman patriciates
