= Stavilac =

Stavilac (Serbian Cyrillic: ставилац, literally meaning "placer") was a court title in Medieval Bosnia and Medieval Serbia in the Middle Ages. It was similar to the Byzantine court offices of domestikos and cup-bearer (pinkernes, known in Serbian as peharnik). It had a role in the ceremony at the royal table, though the holder could be entrusted with jobs that had nothing to do with court rituals. According to studies of Rade Mihaljčić, the holder was in charge of acquiring, preparing and serving food at the royal table. It was a confidant duty, given to the highest and most notable nobility, which the ruler relied on in all occasions.

== History of usage ==
Its oldest mention is from the Serbian court of King Stefan Milutin (r. 1282–1321), when Đuraš Vrančić had the title. The title of stavilac ranked as the last in the hierarchy of the Serbian court, behind čelnik, kaznac, tepčija and vojvoda, the supreme title. It was, nevertheless, quite prestigious as it enabled its holder to be very close to the ruler. In the Dečani chrysobulls, King Stefan Dečanski (r. 1321–1331) mentioned that the court dignitaries present at the Dečani assembly were the kaznac, tepčija, vojvoda, sluga and stavilac. There is not much information on the title-holders at the court of King Stefan Dečanski; there is however much information on those at the court of King and Emperor Stefan Dušan (r. 1331–1355).

In Bosnia, this court title appears for the first time with a coronation of the first Bosnian king, Tvrtko I Kotromanić. As soon as he ascended to a Bosnian throne as a king in 1377, Tvrtko reorganized his court reflecting some of the Serbian court-office titles, ceremonials and traditions.

== List of Bosnian stavilac ==
- Tvrtko Vlađević (1378), served King Tvrtko I
- Ivan Radivojević (1392) served King Dabiša

== List of Serbian stavilac ==
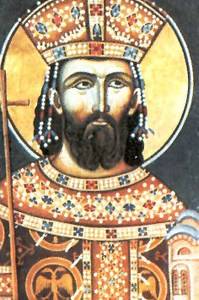
Lazar Hrebeljanović (ca. 1329–1389), who began as stavilac at the court of Emperor Stefan Dušan, later became the most powerful nobles during the Fall of the Serbian Empire.

- Đuraš Vrančić (?), served King Stefan Milutin.
- Miloš Vojinović (fl. 1333), served King Stefan Dušan. Son of Vojvoda Vojin.
- Gradislav Sušenica, served King Stefan Dušan. (disputed)
- Vojislav Vojinović (c. 1350–55), served Emperor Stefan Dušan. Son of Vojvoda Vojin.
- Lazar Hrebeljanović (fl. 1355–1362), served Emperor Stefan Dušan and Emperor Uroš V.

== See also ==
- Serbian noble titles
- Stolnik, title in Poland and Muscovy

== Sources ==
- Blagojević, Miloš (2001). Državna uprava u srpskim srednjovekovnim zemljama (in Serbian). Službeni list SRJ. ISBN 9788635504971.
- Ćirković, Sima; Mihaljčić, Rade (1999). Лексикон српског средњег века (in Serbian). Knowledge. ISBN 9788683233014.
- Dinić, Mihailo; Ćirković, Sima (1978). Српске земље у средњем веку: историјско-географске студије (in Serbian). Српска књижевна задруга.
- Mandić, Svetislav (1986). Velika gospoda sve srpske zemlje i drugi prosopografski prilozi (in Serbian). Srpska književna zadruga. ISBN 9788637900122.
- Mihaljčić, Rade (2001) [1984]. Лазар Хребељановић: историја, култ, предање (in Serbian). Belgrade: Srpska školska knjiga; Knowledge. ISBN 86-83565-01-7.
- Mihaljčić, Rade (1976). "Ставилац" [Stavilac]. Istorijski časopis. ХХIII: 5–21.
- Purković, Miodrag (1985). Srpska kultura srednjega veka (in Serbian). Izd. Srpske pravoslavne eparhije za zapadnu Evropu.
- Šarkić, Srđan (1996). Srednjovekovno srpsko pravo (in Serbian). Matica srpska. ISBN 9788636303696.
- Srejović, Dragoslav; Gavrilović, Slavko; Ćirković, Sima M. (1982). Istorija srpskog naroda: knj. Od najstarijih vremena do Maričke bitke (1371) (in Serbian). Srpska književna zadruga.
