= Mihailo Stevanović (linguist) =

Serbian linguist

Mihailo Stevanović (April 3, 1903 – January 14, 1991) was a Serbian linguist and philologist, professor at the University of Belgrade, and a full member of the Serbian Academy of Sciences and Arts.

== Biography ==
He was born in Stijena Piperska. He was one of the signatories of the Novi Sad agreement on the joint Serbo-Croatian language in 1954. Over his career, he published more than 600 works, including the monumental two-volume Savremeni srpskohrvatski jezik: gramatički sistemi i književnojezička norma ("The modern Serbo-Croatian language: grammatical systems and the literary language norm"; Belgrade, 1964–1969). As an editor, he collaborated on the development of numerous important dictionaries: Rečnik srpkohrvatskoga književnog jezika ("The dictionary of the Serbo-Croatian literary language"; Matica srpska, 1967–1976), Rečnik srpskohrvatskog književnog i narodnog jezika ("The dictionary of the Serbo-Croatian literary and vernacular language; SANU, 1959-), Rečnik Njegoševa jezika ("The dictionary of Njegoš' language"; Belgrade, Cetinje, 1983). Together with Ljudevit Jonke, he co-edited the first joint Serbian and Croatian orthography book (Novi Sad - Zagreb, 1960).

Stevanović also edited journals Srpski dijalektološki zbornik, Južnoslovenski filolog and Naš jezik. He was a full professor (since 1951) and the head of the Department of South Slavic languages and General Linguistics at the Faculty of Philosophy in Belgrade. In 1958, he was elected a corresponding member of the Serbian Academy of Sciences and Arts and became a full member in 1963. He also served as the director of the Serbo-Croatian Language Institute (1963–1973).

He was awarded the Seventh of July Award in 1973, Vuk's Award in 1987, Order of Labor of the first order in 1960, and National Service Medal with Gold Star in 1964.

He died in Belgrade.

Academic offices
Preceded by Dušan Nedeljković	Dean of the Faculty of Philosophy; 1949–1950	Succeeded by Mihailo Dinić
