= Dmitar (kaznac) =

Dmitar (Serbian Cyrillic: Дмитар; fl. 1321) or Dimitrije (Димитрије) was a Serbian nobleman that served kings Stefan Milutin and Stefan Dečanski (r. 1321–31), with the title of kaznac (chamberlain, camerarius). The title-holder was among the foremost at the Serbian court, taking care of state finances. Stefan Dečanski, after becoming king, allowed Dmitar to donate (as a metochion) his village of Brčele (near Bar, Montenegro) to the Monastery of St. Nicholas on the Vranjina island.

== Sources ==
- Blagojević, Miloš (2001). Državna uprava u srpskim srednjovekovnim zemljama (in Serbian). Službeni list SRJ. p. 21. ISBN 9788635504971.
