= Kefalija =

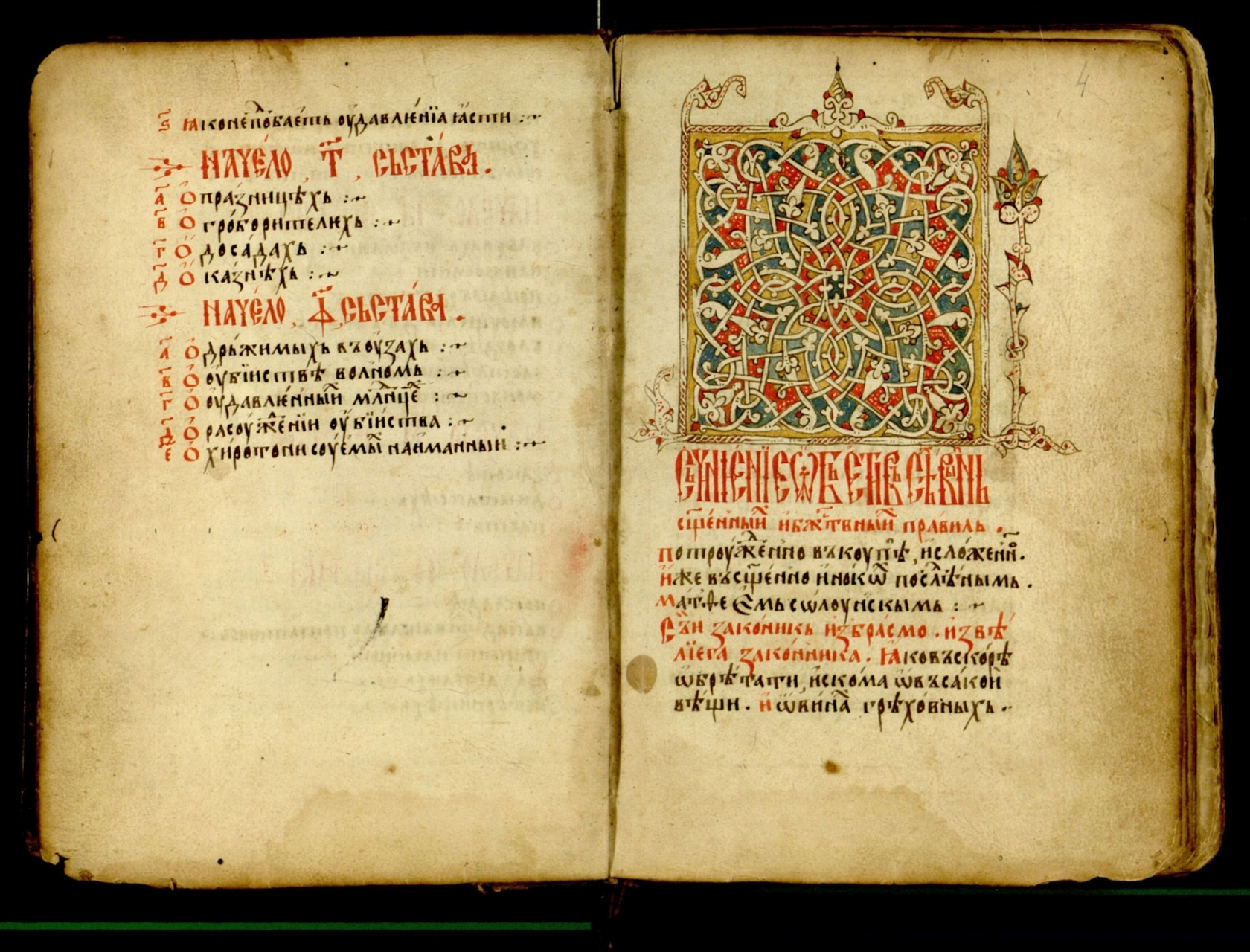
The duties of the kefalija was regulated in the Dušan's Code (1349, 1353).

The kefalija (Serbian: кефалија, pl. kefalije/кефалије, from Greek: κεφαλή) was a civil-military governor of cities and župe (counties) in the Serbian kingdom, empire and successor statelets following the fall of the Serbian Empire, in the 14th–15th centuries. The title was adopted by king Stefan Milutin (r. 1282–1321) with the expansion of territory from the hands of Byzantium, in the last third of the 13th century, when the title kephale was used for civil-military governors of small provinces with one or two cities, dubbed, in historiography, as "local" kephale, and civil-military governors for larger, historical provinces, dubbed "general" kephale. The Palaiologan empire used the title primarily for provincial civil-military governors, with special judicial duties.

Stefan Milutin developed local administration in the Serbian state. At the beginning of the reign of king Stefan Dušan (r. 1331–1355), perhaps in place earlier, the duties of the local kefalija was divided into two offices: gradski kefalija ("city kefalija", civil governor) and kulski kefalija ("tower kefalija", Latin: castellanus, military commander). Stefan Dušan instituted the title and it is seen in higher instances following his coronation as emperor (1345), in both the Serb- and Greek lands. In Serbia, the institution of kefalija was legalized and regulated in the Dušan's Code (1349, 1353). The kefalija was among the nobility that were given territory to administer (država). The 157th article of Dušan's Code shows that the kefalija was also appointed to govern "mixed" župe (counties), with property of the nobility, the church, and the monarch. The kefalija had the duty to secure their territory overall, and the roads, from banditry, and to organize patrols, and in case of robberies, to compensate any losses. The kefalija was seated in the city, from where he collected his income (of unknown size), as per law. Privileges included paying half the price for wheat, meat and wine. Generally, church property was not part of the kefalija's duty. The kefalija was not allowed a meal (obrok) while guesting a monastery, but was allowed in the villages outside church property. As a holder of wide authority, the kefalija was often found as the milosnik (royal envoy) in judicial matters.

The title was removed from the Ottoman-conquered territories of the Dragaš and Mrnjavčević in the 1390s and then gradually extinguished. The city governor kefalija was replaced with vojvoda ("general"), and kulski kefalija ("tower kefalija") was replaced with that of kulski vojvoda ("tower general"), in the Serbian Despotate of the Lazarević by 1412. In some places in the lands of the Lazarević, such as Rudnik, the title of kefalija remained in the mining town and market of Rudnik for some time (fl. 1422–23), the same in Belasica (fl. 1426). In the lands of the Branković, the title remained until the Ottoman conquest in 1455. With the fall of the Despotate, the title survived in Zeta under the Crnojević, which continued the Nemanjić institutions, but not as officials, but as simpler local delegates.

== List ==
- Ilija (fl. 1318–1325), provincial governor ("general" kefalija) of Zeta under Stefan Milutin and Stefan Dečanski.
- Mladen (fl. 1333), kulski kefalija of Skopje under Stefan Dušan.
- Radoslav Pović, city governor of Prizren under Stefan Dušan, and Serres under empress Jelena.
- Rajko, Byzantine-type city governor of Trilis and Vronta under Stefan Dušan.
- David Mihojević (fl. 1355), city governor of Štip under Stefan Dušan.
- Milman (fl. 1359–1361), kefalija of Konavli župa under magnate Vojislav Vojinović.
- Duka Nestong (fl.) 1354–1360), Byzantine-type governor of Serres (1357) under Uroš V.
- Demetrios Eudaimonoioannes (fl. 1360–66), Byzantine-type governor of Serres under Uroš V and Vukašin Mrnjavčević.
- Vladoje, likely provincial governor ("general" kefalija), of Polog and Tetovo.
- Krajša Miroslavić (fl. 1365–1368), kefalija of Konavli župa (1365–1368) under Gojislava Vojinović.
- Miloš (fl. 1366), city governor of Prilep under king Vukašin.
- Obrad Zorka (fl. 1371–1373), kefalija of Konavli župa (1371–1373) under Nikola Altomanović.
- Radič Đurđević (fl. 1371–1376), kefalija of Konavli župa (1374–1376) under the Balšić.
- Dabiživ Spandulj (fl. 1375–76), city governor of Strumica.
- Gojislav (fl. 1387), city gorneror of Novo Brdo under Lazar.
- Oliver, city governor of Bitola under Marko Mrnjavčević.
- Grubadin, kulski kefalija under Andrejaš Mrnjavčević.
- Nikola, unknown territory, served either Vuk Branković or Lazar.
- Branko (fl. 1402), city governor of Priština under Stefan Lazarević.
- Petar Boljadinović (fl. 1399–1405), city governor of Rudnik (1399–1404) under Stefan Lazarević.
- Tuba (fl. 1399–1404), city governor of Novo Brdo (1402–1404) under Stefan Lazarević.
- Oliver Golemović (fl. 1434–1455), city governor of Priština (1434–1439), and "general" kefalija (1448–1454), under Đurađ Branković.
- Vukosav Dobrojević (fl. 1450), city governor of Trepča under Đurađ Branković.

== Sources ==
- Blagojević, Miloš (2001). Државна управа у српским средњовековним земљама [State administration in the Serb medieval lands] (Second ed.). Službeni list SRJ. ISBN 9788635504971.
- Ivanović, Miloš (2019). "Краљевство и друштвена елита у земљама Немањића [The Kingdom and Social Elite in the Lands of the Nemanjić]". Краљевство и архиепископија у српским и поморским земљама Немањића [The Kingdom and Archbishopric in the Serb and Maritime Lands of the Nemanjić]. Историјски институт Београд. pp. 451–502. ISBN 978-86-7025-840-2.
