= Čelnik =

Čelnik (Serbian Cyrillic: челник) was a high court title in the Kingdom of Serbia, Serbian Empire and Serbian Despotate.

In its early form, the holder was entrusted with the security of property belonging to the Orthodox Church from the aristocrats (compare Catholic Vidame), so the holder appeared in the role of a judge or executor of the ruler's decisions, in disputes between the church and the nobility.

At the beginning of the 15th century, during the Serbian Despotate, the title of veliki čelnik (велики челник, "grand čelnik") was the equivalent of count palatine and was the highest court title, with the title-holders holding great provinces, property and honours.

== History ==
During the reign of King Stefan Milutin (r. 1282–1321), the title holder was entrusted with the security of property belonging to the Church from the aristocrats, so the holder appeared in the role of a judge or executor of the ruler's decisions, in disputes between the church and the nobility. At that time the title of čelnik was of a higher rank than stavilac, but lower than kaznac and tepčija, with vojvoda being the supreme title. It is unclear if there was one or several with that title at the court at that time.

During King Stefan Dečanski's reign there were two or three title holders at the same time. During Stefan Dušan's reign, the title of veliki čelnik is first mentioned. The veliki čelnik supervised over several čelniks, each čelnik being a commander of military fortifications (and presumably its troops) or a senior (starešina) of a larger number of villages. After Jovan Oliver and Dimitrije, it seems that the title was not given at the court of Stefan Dušan. During the service of Branilo (fl. 1347) and Đurica (fl. 1350), there is also a mention of Andronik, a čelnik in Polog, though he likely was not of the same category as the former two.

=== List of known čelniks ===
- Gradislav Vojšić (fl. 1284–1327), served Stefan Milutin (fl. 1284).
- Branko (fl. 1306–19), served Stefan Milutin (fl. 1305–06).
- Đuraš Ilijić (fl. 1326–1362), served Stefan Dečanski (fl. 1326).
- Gradislav Vojšić (fl. 1284–1327), served Stefan Dečanski (fl. 1327).
- Vukdrag (d. 1327), served Stefan Dečanski.
- Branilo, served Stefan Dušan (fl. 1347).
- Đurica, served Stefan Dušan (fl. 1350).
- Andronik, served Stefan Dušan (fl. 1350).
- Stanislav, served the Dejanović (fl. 1377).
- Musa, served Uroš V
- Vuk, čelnik, served Stefan Lazarević (fl. 1402)
- Đurađ Golemović (fl. 1453), čelnik, served Đurađ Branković.
- Miloš,
- Miloš Pović (fl. 1370)
- Smil

== Veliki čelnik ==
At the beginning of the 15th century, during the Serbian Despotate, the title of veliki čelnik was the equivalent of count palatine and was the highest court title, with the title-holders holding great provinces, property and honours. Of these, Radič (fl. 1413–41) was the most notable.

=== List of known veliki čelniks ===
- Jovan Oliver, veliki čelnik, served Stefan Dušan (before 1340)
- Dimitrije, veliki čelnik, served Stefan Dušan (before 1349), then Uroš V (fl. 1359)
- Hrebeljan, veliki čelnik, served Stefan Lazarević (fl. 1405)
- Radoslav,
- Radič, veliki? čelnik, served Stefan Lazarević.
- Radič, served Đurađ Branković (fl. 1429)
- Mihailo Anđelović (fl. 1458), served Đurađ and Lazar Branković.

== See also ==
- Serbian titles § Medieval noble titles

== Sources ==
- Blagojević, Miloš (2001). Државна управа у српским средњовековним земљама [State administration in the Serb medieval lands]. Službeni list SRJ. ISBN 9788635504971.
- Ćirković, Sima; Mihaljčić, Rade (1999). Лексикон српског средњег века (in Serbian). Knowledge. ISBN 9788683233014.
- Mandić, Svetislav (1986). Velika gospoda sve srpske zemlje i drugi prosopografski prilozi (in Serbian). Srpska književna zadruga. ISBN 9788637900122.
- Srejović, Dragoslav; Gavrilović, Slavko; Ćirković, Sima M. (1982). Istorija srpskog naroda: knj. Od najstarijih vremena do Maričke bitke (1371) (in Serbian). Srpska književna zadruga.
