= Dejan Manjak =

Serbian nobleman

- vojvoda
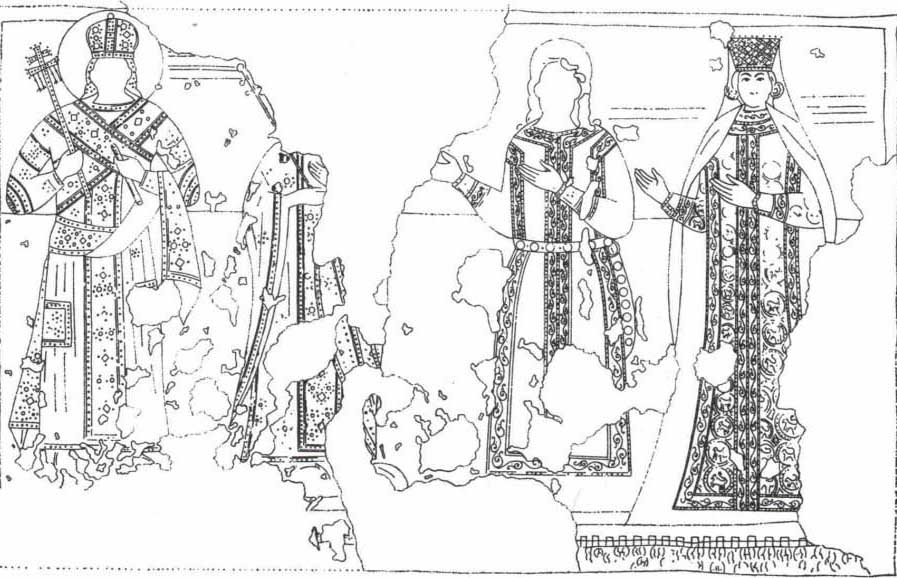
- Sketch of ktitor composition from Kučevište, allegedly depicting vojvoda Dejan and his wife, to the right
- Spouse: (possibly) Vladislava
- Issue: (possibly) Jovan and Dmitar

Dejan Manjak (Serbian Cyrillic: Дејан Мањак, fl. 1333) was a nobleman in the service of Serbian King Stefan Dušan, only mentioned in a charter dated January 22, 1333, in which Stefan Dušan officially sold Ston and Prevlaka to the Republic of Venice. Based on the order in which the witnesses appear, vojvoda Dejan was of lower rank than stavilac Miloš.

K. J. Jireček suggested that Dejan Manjak was the same person as Dejan, the sevastokrator of Dušan.

According to two fresco compositions dated between 1332 and 1337 in the Kučevište Monastery, in the narthex, on the northern and southern wall, Dejan had a wife, Vladislava, and two sons, Jovan and Dmitar. Dejan is depicted on the southern wall with his wife standing next to Stefan Dušan and his wife Jelena.

== Annotations ==
- His surname may also be rendered Manak (Манак) or Manijakis (Манијакис). It is unknown whether Manjak was a demonym or an actual surname.

== Sources ==
- Blagojević, Miloš (2001), Državna uprava u srpskim srednjovekovnim zemljama (in Serbian) (2nd ed.), Belgrade: Službeni list SRJ, ISBN 86-355-0497-6
- Istorisko Društvo NR Srbije (1953), Istorijski glasnik (in Serbian), vol. 1–2, Naučna knjiga
