= Camerarius =

Camerarius may have the following meanings:

Synonymous to titles:

- Chamberlain
- (one of) Papal gentlemen
- Camerlengo
- Kammerer

As a surname; previously as a Latinization of Chamberlain (surname) or Kammerer:

- Elias Rudolph Camerarius Sr.
- Elias Rudolph Camerarius Jr.
- Joachim Camerarius the Elder (1500–1574), German classical scholar
- Joachim Camerarius the Younger (1534–1598), German botanist and physician
- Rudolf Jakob Camerarius (1665–1721), German botanist and physician
