= Dečani chrysobulls =

Founding charters of the monastery of Visoki Dečani (1330–1345)

Charter of Dečani
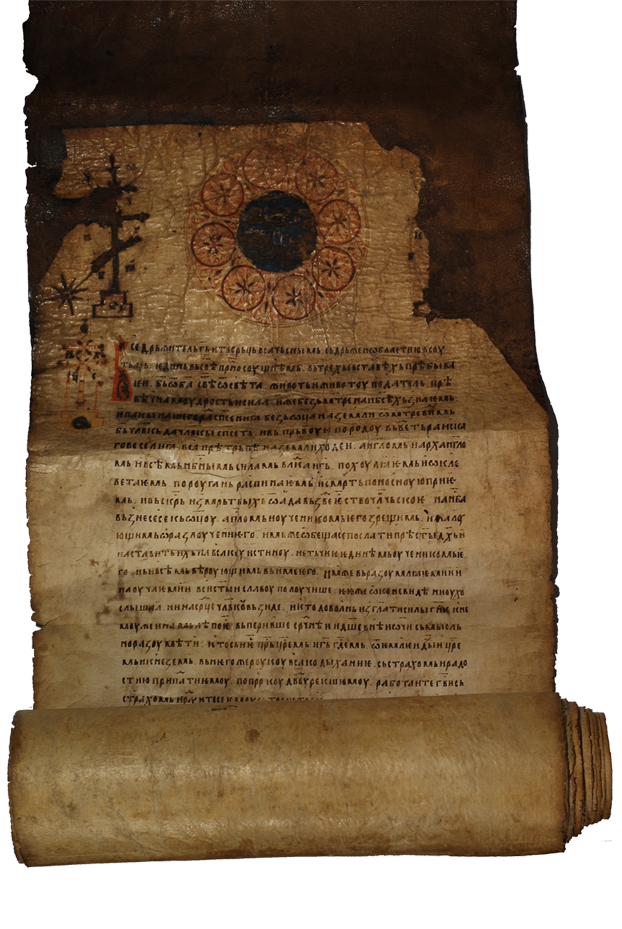
- Original first page
- Also known as: Dečani charter
- Date: 1330
- Place of origin: Kingdom of Serbia
- Language(s): Old Serbian
- Author(s): Stefan Uroš III
- Dedicated to: Visoki Dečani
- Exemplar(s): Archive of the Serbian Academy of Sciences and Arts

The Dečani chrysobulls (Serbian: Дечанске хрисовуље, Dečanske hrisovulje) alternatively known as the Dečani charters (Serbian: Дечанске повеље, Dečanske povelje) are chrysobulls dating to 1330–1345 that constitute the founding charters issued by the Serbian King Stefan Dečanski after the building of the monastery of Visoki Dečani was completed, in 1330. In particular, the charters contain a detailed list of landholdings and tax farming rights which the monastery held over settlements and communities in the Kingdom of Serbia, in an area which spanned from present-day southern Serbia, Kosovo, Montenegro and parts of northern Albania.

== Content ==
The chrysobulls consist in three charters which were written at different times. The first one, a parchment of 390 mm × 5,200 mm (15 in × 205 in), was issued by Stefan Dečanski in 1330 and was written in the royal court of Nerodimlja, in present-day southern Kosovo. It contains an introductory part in Serbian Church Slavonic presenting theological content, the reasons why the King decided to build a new place of worship, and an important section outlining the King's ancestors on which Stefan Dečanski bases his own right on the Serbian throne, before ending the introduction with his autobiography. The central part of the charter, the largest, is written in the Serbian vernacular and focuses first on the King's gifts to the monastery (books, crosses, vases, clothes, etc.), before listing the various villages given to the monastery, with their boundaries. The inhabitants who had to work for the monastery were also mentioned, as well as the rules that they were required to respect. The eschatol, the last part of the first charter, is written again in Serbian Church Slavonic and mentions the council during which the endowments of the monastery were approved and finalized. The court dignitaries present at the Dečani assembly were the kaznac, tepčija, vojvoda, sluga and stavilac. At the end of the charter, reference is made to the Battle of Velbuzhd, which took place on 28 July 1330 and in which Stefan Dečanski's army defeated the troops of the Bulgarian king, Michael Shishman.

The chrysobulls did not list every settlement in the domain of Serbian kings, but only those whose taxes were directly used for the benefit of the monastery. The chrysobulls listed that Visoki Dečani held such rights over 2,097 households of meropsi (dependent farmers-serfs), 266 Vlach households (pastoral communities) and 69 sokalnici (craftsmen). About 90% of the inhabitants of the settlements listed in the second and third charters had Slavic names, which implies that these settlements were mainly inhabited by Serbs. Besides the villages, the settlements also included 9 Vlach and one Albanian katuns. Apart from this Albanian katun, two villages had a characteristic Albanian anthroponymy, these were Greva in Altin and Kuševo in Zeta. Most of the Albanians at the time were Catholic and as such might not have been listed in the documents of Serbian Orthodox monasteries.

== Sources ==
- Fine, John V. A. (1994). The Late Medieval Balkans: A Critical Survey from the Late Twelfth Century to the Ottoman Conquest. Ann Arbor: University of Michigan Press. ISBN 978-0-472-08260-5.
- Grković, Milica (1986). Rečnik imena Banjskog, Dečanskog i Prizrenskog vlastelinstva u XIV veku (in Serbian). Belgrade: Narodna knjiga. ISBN 9788633100243.
- Grković, Milica (2004). Prva hrisovulja Manastira Dečani = The First Charter of the Dečani Monastery (in Serbian and English). Belgrade: Centar za očuvanje nasleđa Kosova i Metohije - MNEMOSYNE. ISBN 9788684431020.
- Ivić, Pavle; Grković, Milica (1976). Dečanske hrisovulje (in Serbian). Novi Sad: Institut za lingvistiku u Novom Sadu.
- Šarkić, Srđan (1996). Srednjovekovno srpsko pravo [Medieval Serbian law] (in Serbian). Novi Sad: Matica srpska. ISBN 9788636303696.
