= Mihailo Dinić =

Serbian historian

- Born: April 23, 1899; Lučica, Požarevac, Kingdom of Serbia
- Died: May 12, 1970 (aged 71); Belgrade, SFR Yugoslavia
- Occupation: historian

Mihailo Dinić (Serbian Cyrillic: Михаило Динић; 23 April 1899 – 12 May 1970) was a Serbian historian and member of the Serbian Academy of Science and Arts. He was among the key figures of the Serbian historiography of the 20th century.

He was among many notable scholars in Serbia who bequeathed their personal libraries to the National Library of Serbia.

== Bibliography ==
- "Стефан Драгутин „гех Serviae"" [Stephen Dragutin "rex Serviae"], Glasnik IDNS 4, 1931, 436–437
- "Dubrovacka srednjevekovna karavanska trgovina" Jugoslovenski Istoriski Casopis 3 (1937)
- "Трг Дријева и околина у средњем веку". Годишњица НЧ. 47. Belgrade. 1938.
- Zemlje Hercega Svetoga Save. 1940.
- "Два савременика о боју на Косову" [Two contemporaries about the Battle of Kosovo], Glas, Serbian Royal Academy, CLXXXII, 1940
- "Jedan prilog za istoriju patarena u Bosni" - Zbornik Filozofskog fakulteta, I, Belgrade 1948
- Dušanova carska titula u očima savremennika [Dusan's Imperial Title in the Eyes of Contemporaries]. 1951.
- Notae et acta cancellariae Ragusinae. Academia Scientiarum et Artium Slavorum Meridionalium. 1951.
- "Област краља Драгутина после Дежева" [King Dragutin's territory after Deževo], Glas 203, 1951, 61–82
- Tri povelje iz ispisa Ivana Lučića. 1955.
- За историју рударства у средњевековној Србији и Босни: I део. издавачко предузеће "Научна книга. 1955.
- Државни сабор средњевековне Босне. Научна књига. 1955.
- "Humsko-Trebinjska vlastela" Beograd, 1967, 114 p., Naucno delo, S.A.N. Posebna izdanja
- "Španski najamnici u srpskoj službi" Zbornik Radova Vizantološkog Instituta, VI, Belgrade, 1960, str. 15–28
- "Odnos između kralja Milutina i Dragutina" Zbornik Radova Vizantološkog Instituta, br. 3, str. 49-82 (1955)
- "Nastanak dva naša srednjovekovna grada", Prilozi, XXXI, sveska 3–4, Belgrade 1965
- Spomenica posvećena preminulom akademiku Mihailu Diniću. 1971.
- Srpske zemlje u srednjem veku: istorijsko-geografske studije. Srpska književna zadruga. 1978.

Academic offices
Preceded by Mihailo Stevanović	Dean of the Faculty of Philosophy; 1950–1951	Succeeded by Borislav Stevanović
