= Rade Mihaljčić =

Serbian historian and academic (1937–2020)

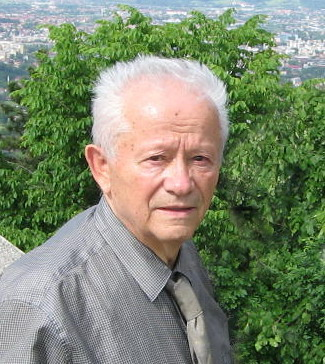
- Mihaljčić in Banja Luka, 2008
- Born: 21 January 1937; Bosanska Gradiška, Yugoslavia (now Bosnia and Herzegovina)
- Died: 26 March 2020 (aged 83); Belgrade, Serbia
- Occupation: Historian

Rade Mihaljčić (Serbian Cyrillic: Раде Михаљчић; 21 January 1937 – 26 March 2020) was a Serbian historian and academic. Most of his works deal with medieval Serbia, especially the Serbian Empire and the Battle of Kosovo.

== Major works ==
Monographies:

- The Fall of the Serbian Empire (Kraj Srpskog carstva), 1975.
- Lazar Hrebeljanović - istorija, kult, predanje, 1984.
- Heroes of the Kosovo Legends (Junaci kosovske legende), 1989.
- Mihaljčić, Rade (1989). The Battle of Kosovo in History and in Popular Tradition. Beograd: BIGZ.
- Bezimeni junak, 1995.
- Boj na Kosovu u bugaršticama i epskim pesmama kratkog stiha, 1995, co-author with Jelka Ređep
- Prošlost i narodno sećanje, 1995; Srpska prošlost i narodno sećanje, 2001.
- Izvorna vrednost stare srpske građe, 2001.
- Vladarske titule oblasnih gospodara - prilog vladarskoj ideologiji u starijoj srpskoj prošlosti, 2001.
- Zakoni u starim srpskim ispravama, 2006.

Articles:

- Selišta. Prilog istoriji naselja u srednjovekovnoj srpskoj državi, Zbornik FF u Beogradu IX-1 (1967) 173–224.
- Gde se nalaѕio grad Petrus?, Prilozi KJIF 34, 3–4 (1968) 264–267.
- Bitka kod Aheloja, Zbornik FF u Beogradu XI-1 (1970) 271–275.
- Vojnički zakon, Zbornik FF u Beogradu XII-1 (1974) 305–309.
- Knez Lazar i obnova srpske države, O knezu Lazaru, Beograd 1975, 1–11.
- Stavilac, IČ HHIII (1976) 5–21.
- L‘État Serbe et l‘universalisme de la seconde Rome, Da Roma alla terza Roma, Roma, Constatinopoli, Mosca, Roma 1983, 375–386.
- Djed, Dmitar Zvinimir, Dorf, Lexikon des Mittelalters III-6, München 1985.
- Dabiša, Lexikon des Mittelalters III-7, München 1985.
- Drijeva, Lexikon des Mittelalters III-7, München 1985.
- Otroci, IG 1-2 (1986) 51–57.
- Lazar Hrebeljanović, Lexikon des Mittelalters V, München 1990.
- Istorijska podloga izreke „Od Kulina bana“, IG 1-2 (1992) 7–13.
- Vladarska titula gospodin, IG 1-2 (1994) 29–36.
- Kosovska legenda kao istorijski izvor, Godišnik na Sofiiski universitet „Sv. Kliment Ohridski“ 86–5 (1992–1993), Sofija 1995, 51–59.
- La corégence dans l’État des Nemanić, Σύμμεικτα 11 (Αθήνα 1997) 215–227.
- Prezimena izvedena od titula, Raskovnik 87–88 (proleće–zima 1997), Tematski zbornik Marko Kraljević, istorija, mit, legenda, Beograd 1998, 9–34.
- Mara Hrebeljanović, Danica 2000, Beograd 1999, 127–147.
- Gospodar – vladarska titula Ivana Crnojevića, Zapisi 3–4 (1999) 7–15.
- Dušanov zakonik u sudskoj praksi, Dušanov zakonik – 650 godina od njegovog donošenja, Banja Luka 2000, 35–50.
- Povelja kralja Stefana Tvrtka I Kotromanića knezu i vojvodi Hrvoju Vukčiću Hrvatiniću, Stari srpski arhiv (SSA) 1 (Beograd 2002) 117–129.
- Hrisovulja cara Uroša melničkom mitropolitu Kirilu, SSA 2 (2003) 85–97.
- Mljetske povelje cara Uroša, SSA 3 (2004) 71–87.
- Hrisovulja cara Uroša manastiru Hilandaru, SSA 4 (2005) 151–160.
- Hrisovulja cara Uroša manastiru Hilandaru o daru kaluđera Romana, SSA 5 (2006) 139–148.
- Slovo braće Brankovića manastiru Hilandaru, SSA 6 (2007) 151–166 (co-author with Irena Špadijer).
- Povelja Stefana Ostoje Dubrovčanima, Građa o prošlosti Bosne (GPB) 1 (Banja Luka 2008) 123–135.
- Povelja kralja Ostoje kojom potvrđuje ranije darovnice Dubrovniku, SSA 7 (2008) 163–173)
