= Miloš Blagojević =

- Born: 17 October 1930; Miletićevo, Plandište, Kingdom of Yugoslavia
- Died: 27 June 2012 (aged 81); Belgrade, Serbia
- Occupation: Historian

Miloš Blagojević (Serbian: Милош Благојевић; 17 October 1930 – 27 June 2012) was a Serbian historian and member of the Serbian Academy of Science and Arts (SANU). After completing high school in Vršac, he graduated the Naval Academy in Split in 1951. Due to political reasons, he was unable to continue in the military, so he graduated Belgrade Faculty of Philosophy in 1960.

== Work ==
- Blagojević, Miloš (2004). "Veliki knez i zemaljski knez". Зборник радова Византолошког института (41). National Library of Serbia: 293–318. doi:10.2298/zrvi0441293b. ISSN 0584-9888.
- Blagojević, Miloš (2001). Државна управа у српским средњовековним земљама [State administration in the Serb medieval lands] (in Serbian). Službeni list SRJ. ISBN 9788635504971.
- Blagojević, Miloš (1996). "Жупа Реке и Дендра (Δένδρα) Јована Кинама". Зборник радова Византолошког института. 35: 197–212.
- Blagojević, Miloš (1993). "On the National Identity of the Serbs in the Middle Ages". Serbs in European Civilization. Belgrade: Nova, Serbian Academy of Sciences and Arts, Institute for Balkan Studies. pp. 20–31. ISBN 9788675830153.
- Blagojević, Miloš (1989). Србија у доба Немањића [Serbia in the era of the Nemanjić] (in Serbian). Вајат. ISBN 9788670390287.
- Blagojević, Miloš (1982). "Савладарство". Зборник радова Византолошког института. XXI. Научно дело: 183-.
- Blagojević, Miloš (1976). "„Сеченица (Σετζενιτζα), Стримон (Στρυμων) и Тара (Ταρα) у делу Јована Кинама". Зборник радова Византолошког института. 17. Византолошки институт: 65–75 – via Google Books.
