= Medieval Serbian nobility =

Privileged class in medieval Serbia

In the medieval Serbian states, the privileged class consisted of nobility and clergy, distinguished from commoners, part of the feudal society. The Serbian nobility (srpska vlastela, srpsko vlastelinstvo or srpsko plemstvo) were roughly grouped into magnates (velikaši or velmože), the upper stratum, and the lesser nobility (vlasteličići). Serbia followed the government model established by the Byzantine Empire.

The nobility possessed hereditary allodial estates, which were worked by dependent sebri, the equivalent of Byzantine paroikoi; peasants owing labour services, formally bound by decree. The nobility was obliged to serve the monarch in war.

== Hierarchy ==
The nobility (vlastela, vlastelinstvo or plemstvo) of Serbia in the Middle Ages is roughly divided into magnates (velikaši or velmože), nobility and petty noblemen (vlasteličići). Sometimes, the division is made between vlastela (including "great" and "small" ones) and vlasteličići, the petty nobility. The lower-half social class, commoners, were the sebri (себри).

- The velikaši (великаши) were the highest nobility class of Serbia.
- The vlasteličići (властеличићи) were the lower nobility class of Serbia. It was a relatively numerous class of the small, warrior nobility, originating from the vojnici (warriors) from sources from the end of the 12th and the beginning of the 13th century. They held villages, with full rights, and in socioeconomic and legal terms stood below the vlastela. They had military obligations, such as the vlasteličić joining the army individually or with a group of his men (soldiers), dependent on his wealth.

== History ==
=== Early Medieval Serbian principalities ===
The Serbs at that time were organized into župe (sing. župa), a confederation of village communities (roughly the equivalent of a county), headed by a local župan (a magistrate or governor); the governorship was hereditary, and the župan reported to the Serbian prince, whom they were obliged to aid in war.

According to Fine Jr.: Bosnia, Zahumlje and Rascia were never incorporated into an integrated state with Duklja (1043–1101); each principality had its own nobility and institutions, simply requiring a member of the royal family to rule as Prince or Duke. After Constantine Bodin died, the principalities seceded from Duklja, and Vukan became the most powerful Serb ruler, as Grand Prince. Subordinate to the ruler were local counts who seem to have been more or less autonomous in the internal affairs of their counties, but who swore loyalty and were obliged to support in war. It seems that the counts were hereditary holders of their counties, holding their land before Duklja annexed Rascia.

=== Serbian Kingdom ===
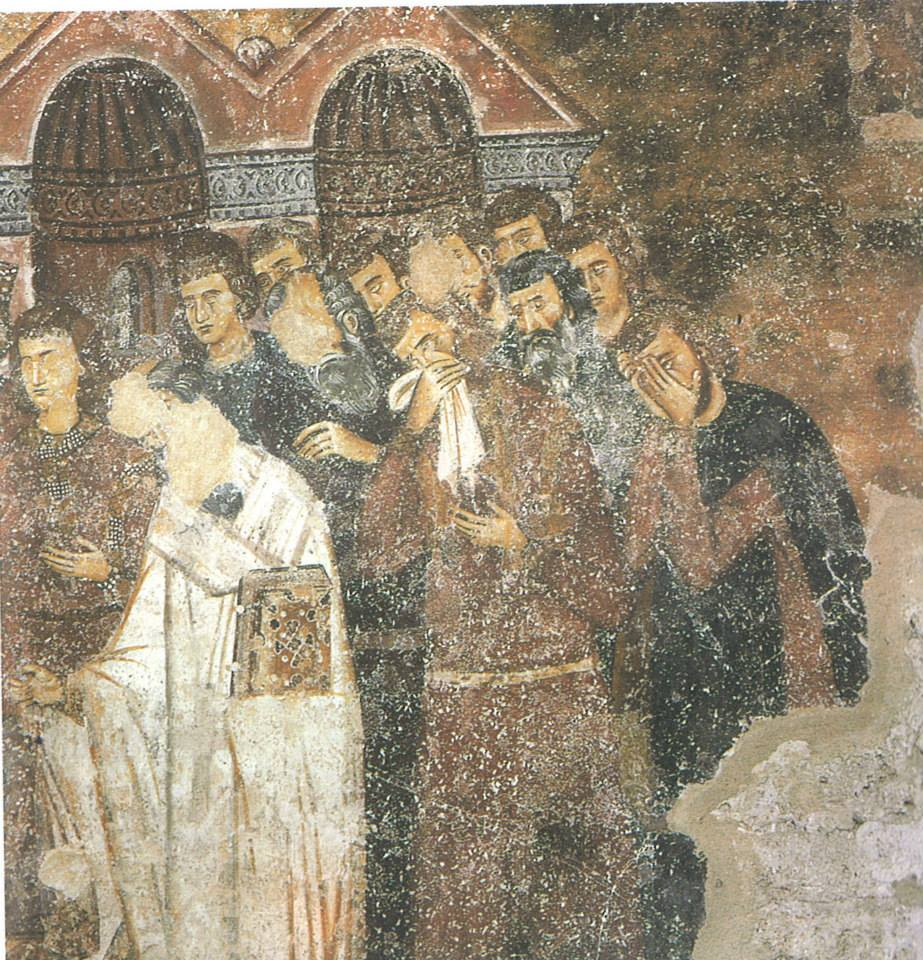
Mourning nobility at the burial of Queen Anna Dandolo.

The hierarchy of the Serbian court titles was the following: stavilac, čelnik, kaznac, tepčija and vojvoda, the supreme title.

In the Dečani chrysobulls, King Stefan Dečanski (r. 1321–1331) mentioned that the court dignitaries present at the Dečani assembly were the kaznac, tepčija, vojvoda, sluga and stavilac.

=== Serbian Empire ===
On April 16, 1346 (Easter), Stephen Uroš IV Dušan of Serbia convoked a huge assembly at Skopje, attended by the Serbian Archbishop Joanikije II, the Archbishop of Ochrid Nikolaj I, the Bulgarian Patriarch Simeon and various religious leaders of Mount Athos. The assembly and clerics agreed on, and then ceremonially performed the raising of the autocephalous Serbian Archbishopric to the status of Serbian Patriarchate. The Archbishop from now on is titled Serbian Patriarch, although some documents called him Patriarch of Serbs and Greeks, with the seat at the Patriarchal Monastery of Peć. The first Serbian Patriarch Joanikije II now solemnly crowned Dušan as "Emperor and autocrat of Serbs and Romans" (Greek Bασιλεὺς καὶ αὐτoκράτωρ Σερβίας καὶ Pωμανίας). Dušan had his son crowned King of Serbs and Greeks, giving him nominal rule over the Serbian lands, and although Dušan was governing the whole state, he had special responsibility for the "Roman", i.e. Greek lands.

A further increase in the Byzantinization of the Serbian court followed, particularly in court ceremonial and titles. As Emperor, Dušan could grant titles only possible as an Emperor. In the years that followed, Dušan's half-brother Symeon Uroš and brother-in-law Jovan Asen became despotes. Jovan Oliver already had the despot title, granted to him by Andronikos III. His brother-in-law Dejan Dragaš and Branko is granted the title of sebastocrator. The military commanders (voivodes) Preljub and Vojihna receive the title of caesar. The raising of the Serbian Patriarch resulted in the same spirit, bishoprics became metropolitans, as for example the Metropolitanate of Skopje.

=== Fall of the Serbian Empire ===
Emperor Uroš V died childless in December 2/4 1371, after much of the Serbian nobility had been destroyed in Maritsa earlier that year. This marked an end to the once powerful Empire. Vukašin's son Marko, who had earlier been crowned Young King was to inherit his father's royal title, and thus became one in the line of successors to the Serbian throne. Meanwhile, the nobles pursued their own interests, sometimes quarreling with each other. Serbia, without an Emperor "became a conglomerate of aristocratic territories", and the Empire was thus divided between the provincial lords: Marko, the Dejanović brothers, Đurađ I Balšić, Vuk Branković, Nikola Altomanović, Lazar Hrebeljanović and other lesser ones.

== List of nobility ==
=== Early medieval Serbian principalities (9th century–1100) ===
- Beloje, Lord of Trebinje (before 847)
- Krajina Belojević, Duke of Travunia (after 847)
- Hvalimir Belojević, Duke of Travunia (late 9th century)
- Čučimir Belojević, Duke of Travunia (first half of 10th century)
- Draško, Duke of Narentines (fl. 836–839)
- Ljudislav, Duke of Narentines (ca. 840)
- Uneslaf and Diodur, Duke of Narentines (after 840)
- Peter, archon of Diokleia (10th- or 11th century)
- John, protospatharios and katepano of Ras (fl. 971–976)
- Ljutovid, protospatharios epi tou Chrysotriklinou, hypatos, strategos of Serbia and Zahumlje (fl. 1039–1042)
- Domanek, Duke of Travunia (fl. 1054–1055)
- Petrilo (fl. 1072), vojvoda
- Stefan, Duke of Bosnia (fl. 1081–1101)

=== Serbian Grand Principality (1100–1217) ===
- Grdeša (fl. 1154–56), župan of Trebinje
- Vučina (fl. 1150–51), župan
- Radomir (fl. 1170), župan in Trebinje
- Slavogast (fl. 1154–56), ban of Hum
- Hramko, Lord of provinces in Hum (ca 1177–1200)
- Svergius (?), župan
- Đura (fl. 1186), satnik (stotnik), Stefan Nemanja's delegate in the city of Kotor

=== Serbian Kingdom (1217–1345) ===
- Obrad (fl. 1230s), veliki tepčija, served Stefan Vladislav
- Manojlo (fl. 1237), vojvoda (duke), served king Vladislav, mentioned in king's charter to noblemen of Split
- Pribilša, župan, son of Grdeša, "died in the time of Stefan Vladislav".
- Bogdan Radojević (fl. 1278), kaznac.
- several (small) nobles from charter of prince Andrija of Hum in 1240. - Hrelko Rastomirić, Dobrovit Radovčić, Hrelja Stepković, Odumisl i Strezimir Adamović, Čepren Osilić, Hranislav Prvoslavić, Bigren Mrđić, Dobromisl Pobratović, Desin Berivojević, Radovan Pribidružić, Hrelja Desavčić, Pribin Zlošević, Toma Čupetić, Galic Vuksanić, Hrelja Hranidružić, Predislav Vukmirić, Vojmir Vlastinić, Bogdan Dobromirić, Hrvatin Turbić, Prvoslav Prodančić, Bratoslav Vuković, Berko Radovančić
- Vlado, kaznac, served between 1274 and 1279
- Prvoslav Radojević (fl. 1280), kaznac, served Helen of Anjou.
- Mrnjan (fl. 1288), kaznac, served Helen of Anjou at the court at Trebinje
- Miroslav, kaznac, served Stefan Milutin
- Kuzma (fl. 1306), tepčija, served Stefan Milutin.
- Branko, čelnik, served Stefan Milutin.
- Vladislav Jonima (fl. 1303–19), župan (fl. 1306), served Stefan Milutin in northern Albania (fl. 1303–06).
- Dražen Bogopenec (fl. 1306–07), župan, served Stefan Milutin in eastern Hum.
- Hardomil, tepčija (1306–1321), served Stefan Milutin.
- Novak Grebostrek (fl. 1312), veliki vojvoda. fought at Gallipoli
- Jovan Dragoslav (fl. 1290–1315), kaznac (fl. 1300), veliki kaznac (fl. 1315), serving Stefan Milutin. Founder of Church of Virgin Hodegetria.
- Brajko/Bradko (fl. 1319)
- Mišljen, veliki tepčija, served Stefan Dečanski.
- Radosav, tepčija, served Stefan Dečanski.
- Ilija, kefalija (fl. 1318–1322)
- Vukdrag (d. 1327), čelnik. took monastic vows as Nikola
- Baldovin, knez. Governed Vranje during Stefan Dečanski. Bagaš noble family.
- Mladen (fl. 1323–26), vojvoda. Branković family ancestor.
- Ružir (fl. 1336), vojvoda.
- Nikola (fl. 1321–1329), župan. Governed northern Albania, younger brother of Mladen.
- Petar Brajan, (fl. 1340–42), župan.
- Đuraš Vrančić, stavilac.
- Miloš Vojinović (fl. 1333), stavilac. son of Vojin
- Dmitar of Zvečan and Bojko of Matka, sons of widow Danica (fl. 1336–1337)
- Hrelja, vojvoda, Governed Rila (fl. ca. 1320s-1342)
- Vojin, vojvoda, Governed Gacko (fl. 1322–1347)
- Vladoje (fl. 1326), tepčija.
- Mrnjava, provincial lord (fl. 1329)
- Bogoje, Lord of province in Zeta (fl. 1340)
- Ivan Dragušin (fl. 1325–40). Dušan's maternal cousin.
- Jovan and Radoslav, sons of vojvoda Dejan (Manjak?) and Vladislava
- Milten Draživojević (fl. 1332–43), župan, served Stefan Dušan.
- Vratko Čihorić (fl. 1335), župan.

=== Serbian Empire (1345–1371) ===
- Jovan Oliver (fl. 1331–56), veliki vojvoda, sevastokrator and despot. Governed Štip and Strumica.
- Dejan (fl. 1346–66), vojvoda, sevastokrator and despot. Governed province between Kumanovo and Velbazhd.
- Branko Mladenović, sevastokrator. Governed Ohrid. Son of Mladen.
- Vukašin (d. 1371), vojvoda, despot, king, Governed Prilep. Son of Mrnjava.
- Preljub (d. 1356), vojvoda, caesar. Governed Thessaly (1348–1356).
- Simeon Uroš (d. 1370), despot. Governed Epirus (1359–1366), and Thessaly (1359–1370). Nemanjić.
- Ivaniš (fl. 1348), despot, ruled a region in Toplica.
- Voihna (d. ca 1360), vojvoda, caesar. Governed Drama.
- Grgur (fl. 1361), vojvoda, caesar. Governed Polog.
- Branko Rastislalić (d. 1352), vojvoda, domestikos. Governed Podunavlje.
- Nikola Radonja (d. 1399),caesar. Estate in Serres. Son of Branko Mladenović.
- Vratko (fl. 1331–47), vojvoda. Governed Prokuplje. Nemanjić.
- Radoslav Hlapen, vojvoda. Governed Veria, Voden and Kastoria.
- Đuraš Ilijić (d. 1356), čelnik. Governed Upper Zeta. Son of Ilija.
- Vlatko Paskačić (fl. 1365), sevastokrator. Governed Slavište. Son of Paskač.
- Palman, knight, bodyguard and mercenary commander.
- Vojin (fl. 1322–1347), vojvoda. Governed Gacko.
- Bogut (fl. 1331), vojvoda. Governed Ugljevik.
- Vuk Kosača (d. 1359), vojvoda. Governed Rogatica.
- Nikola Bagaš (fl. 1354–85), gospodar. Governed Edessa and Trikala.
- Lazar Hrebeljanović (d. 1389), stavilac. Son of Pribac.
- Pribac (fl. 1346), logotet, veliki sluga.
- Bogdan (fl. 1363), kaznac in the service of Emperor Uroš V
- Thomas Preljubović, despot. Governed Ioannina. Son of Preljub.
- Altoman (fl. 1335–59), veliki župan. Son of Vojin.
- Maljušat, župan. Governed Vranje. Son of Baldovin.
- Pribil (fl. 1370s), župan.
- Novak (fl. 1369), kesar. Governed Lake Prespa.
- Mladen Vladojević (fl. 1348).
- Tolislav, kaznac
- Dabiživ Čihorić (fl. 1334–d. 1362), sluga (1343–62). Governed Trebinje and Konavle (1330s–1346).
- Stepko Čihorić (fl. 1334–69), tepčija.
- Nenac Čihorić (fl. 1336–75), župan.
- Đurađ Balšić (d. 1378), gospodar. Governed Zeta.
- Jovan Dragaš, despot. Governed Kumanovo (d. 1378, son of vojvoda Dejan)
- Jeremias Chranislav, archon of the Diocese of Stagi (fl. 1355)
- Michael, archon of Prosek (fl. 1342)
- Đorđe Ostouša Peklal (d. 1377), monastic vows as Jefrem. Relative of Jovan Oliver.
- Jovan Prosenik (c. 1350–60), sevast.
- Musa, čelnik, member of Musić family
- Čuljko veliki vlastodržac (c. 1376), nobleman at Tsar Dušan's court

=== Fall of the Serbian Empire (1371–1395) ===
- Milutin (d. 1389), vojvoda. Governed Rudnik.
- Radič Crnojević (fl. 1392–96), gospodar. Estates in Upper Zeta.
- Bratoslav (fl. 1370), logotet.
- Dragoslav (fl. 1357–1360), logotet.
- Uglješa Vlatković (fl. 1427), kesar. Governed Slavište.
- Dabiživ Spandulj (fl. 1375–76), kefalija. Governed Strumica. Served Dejanović brothers.
- Žarko Merešić and Mihajlo Davidović (d. 1371).
- Stefan Musić and Lazar Musić. Sons of Musa.

Lazar of Serbia

- Crep (fl. 1380), vojvoda. Governed Paraćin. Son of Vukoslav.
- Vitomir (fl. 1380), vojvoda.
- Grubac (fl. 1377), protovestijar.
- Nenad(a) (fl. 1372–87), logotet. Son of kaznac Bogdan.
- Petar (fl. 1387), župan
- Miho (fl. 1387), čelnik
- Gojislav (fl. 1387), kefalija. Served Lazar. Governed Novo Brdo.
- Ljudina Bogosav (fl. 1381). Governor of Smederevo.
- Desivoje (fl. 1380).
- Detoš (before 1389). Governed Dragobilj.
- Dragoslav Veter (before 1389). Lord of Sinji Vir.
- Dragosav Probiščić, vojvoda. Unknown in history.
- Vlatko Vlađević. Unknown in history.
- Ivaniš Ivanišević. Grandson of Ivaniš.
- Jugda (fl. 1381)
- Krajmir or Krajko (d. 1389), vojvoda. Son of Jovan Oliver.
- Novak (fl. 1381), logotet.
- Obrad Dragoslalić (fl. 1387–1392), vojvoda, stripped of hereditary lands by Stefan.
- Ognjan (fl. 1381).
- Petar Vojinović
- Uglješa Desisalić (d. 1394)

Vuk Branković

- Branislav, treasurer
- Todor, son of Žegar, nobleman
- Todor Hamirović, nobleman
- Smil, čelnik
- Stefan, logothete
- Dragosav, nobleman

Mrnjavčević brothers

- logothete Gojko Mrnjavčević. Served Mrnjavčević.
- logothete Dabiživ,. Served Mrnjavčević.
- logothete Kosan,. Served Mrnjavčević.
- čelnik Manko. Served Mrnjavčević.
- čelnik Ivoje. Served Mrnjavčević.
- čelnik Stanislav. Served Mrnjavčević.
- čelnik Milan/Miljan. Served Mrnjavčević.
- kefalija Miloš. Served Mrnjavčević.
- Radoslav Sablja
- kefalija Oliver, of Bitola. Served Mrnjavčević.
- Ostoja Rajaković, around Ohrid
- kefalija Georgije, brother of protostrator Staniša
- Georgije Isaris, under Dušan and Uglješa
- veliki čauš Kardamis, member of the higher law-court in Serres
- Grgur

=== Serbian Despotate (1402–1540) ===
Stefan Lazarević

- Hrebeljan (fl. 1399), čelnik.
- Radič (fl. 1413–41), čelnik.
- Mazarek (fl. 1414–23), vojvoda. Governor of Rudnik and Ostrovica (1414–?), and Zeta (1422–1423)
- Logosit (fl. 1422), vojvoda.
- Bogdan (fl. 1408), protovestijar. Served Despot Stefan Lazarević. ktetor of Kalenić.
- Petar, brother of Bogdan.
- Mihailo (fl. 1398–1413), vojvoda.
- Nikola Zojić and Novak Belocrkvić (fl. 1398). conspiracists.
- Mladen Psisin (fl. 1405). Holder of Jabučje.
- Radoslav Mihaljević, veliki vojvoda
- Mihal, nobleman, from Parakinov Brod
- Vukašin (fl. 1399), treasurer
- Šainac (fl. 1399), nobleman
- Miltoš (fl. 1402), vojvoda
- Ivan, treasurer, from Novo Brdo
- Vuk, čelnik
- Vitan, čelnik
- Petar (fl. 1405), kefalija
- Tuba (fl. 1402), kefalija of Novo Brdo
- Vladislav, vojvoda (duke) in the vicinity of Užice
- Novak Karaljuk (fl. 1404–1410), nobleman
- Nikola Dorjenović (fl. 1425), nobleman, founder of Nikolje monastery
- Ivčin Hodanović, emissary to city of Dubrovnik
- Đurađ Zubrović, nobleman
- Vlatko (fl. 1422), vojvoda (duke), emissary to Venice on behalf of despot Stefan

Despot Đurađ Branković

- Paskoje Sorkočević, čelnik riznički
- Damjan Đurđević, from Dubrovnik, counselor
- Aloviz Rastić, from Dubrovnik, counselor
- Nikola de Arhilupus, from Kotor, counselor
- Nikola Rodop, treasurer
- Stefan and Jovan Rodop (both fl. 1441), noblemen, brothers, possibly sons of Nikola Rodop
- Andrija Humoj (fl. 1422), fortress of Baleč
- Kalojan Rusota, counselor, nobleman from Greece
- Mihailo Mihaljević, nobleman, brother of Radoslav Mihaljević
- Vitomir (fl. 1435), vojvoda (duke), negotiator with Venetians on behalf of despot Đurađ.
- Nikša (fl. 1435), cancellarium, mentioned in despot Đurađ's peace treaty with Venice (1435)
- Altoman, vojvoda (duke), warfare in Zeta
- Jeremija (fl. 1428), vojvoda (duke), fortress of Golubac
- Mihal (fl. 1445), veliki čelnik
- Thomas Kantakouzenos
- Janja Kantakouzenos
- Dimitrije Kantakuzin
- Radič (fl. 1413–41), veliki čelnik.
- Jakša (fl. 1453), vojvoda
- Đurađ Golemović, nobleman
- Oliver (Olko) Golemović (fl. 1448), kefalija of Priština
- Miljen (fl. 1405), čelnik
- Stefan (fl. 1405), čelnik
- Divko Zaulović, nobleman from Drivast
- Junc, nobleman from Dečani
- Vukašin, nobleman from Paštrovići area, known to be a subject of despot after conflict with Venetians in Zeta
- Stefan Belmužević (fl. 1448), nobleman
- Miloš Belmužević (fl. 1453), vojvoda (duke), defender of Medun fortress in Upper Zeta
- Novak Pavlović (fl. 1417), emissary of Đurađ Branković to city of Dubrovnik.
- Mihajlo Nikolić (fl. 1415), courier of Đurađ Branković in Dubrovnik.
- Radoman from Trepča, emissary of Đurađ Branković in Dubrovnik
- Vojin Juga (fl. 1423), vojvoda (duke), present during peace talks with Venetians in Zeta
- Radoje Jezdrović (fl. 1414), court clerk of despot Đurađ
- Bogosav "Kruška" (fl. 1406), nobleman of Branković family, emissary in Dubrovnik
- Novak (fl. 1423), vojvoda (duke)
- Lukač (fl. 1405–1426), vojvoda (duke), witness on peace treaty between despot Đurađ and Venetian emissary F.Quirin
- Mrkša (fl. 1426), vojvoda (duke)
- Andrija Angelović (fl. 1442), ally of despot Đurađ Branković during siege of Drivast.
- Manojlo Radić (fl. 1446), vojvoda (duke), trustee of Đurađ Branković in his correspondence with city of Dubrovnik.
- Voihna, logothete of despot Đurađ
- Dmitar Radojević (fl. 1455), čelnik, active in war against Bosnian kingdom
- Dmitar Krajković (fl. 1450), grand čelnik
- Stojko Gizdavić (fl. 1444), vojvoda (duke), negotiator of despot Đurađ during peace talks with Turks in Edirne in June 1444
- Junije (Džono) Gradić, from Dubrovnik, counselor of despot Đurađ
- Komnen, vojvoda (duke), despot Đurađ's commander in Zeta
- Vuk Biomužević (fl. 1450), vojvoda (duke), despot's commander in Luštica
- Radič Bogdašić (fl. 1435), nobleman, one of the witnesses on peace treaty with Venetian Republic
- Radisav Zančić (fl. 1433), nobleman in Srebrenica
- Branko Zančić (fl. 1433), nobleman, brother of Radisav, despot's official
- Radič (fl. 1436), vojvoda (duke) of Srebrenica
- Vukosav Govedinić (fl. 1450–1456), vojvoda (duke) of Smederevo
- Petar Kovačević Dinjičić, vojvoda (duke) of Srebrenica, ally of despot Đurađ in 1443.
- Bogavac Milaković, nobleman, entourage of Kantakuzina Branković
- Pavle Mikšić, nobleman, entourage of Kantakuzina (Katarina) Branković when married to Ulrich II of Celje
- Bezubica (fl. 1431), despot Đurađ's ambassador to Ottoman court in Edirne
- Nikola Vitomirović, nobleman
- Novak Naselorić (fl. 1428), in service of grand čelnik Radič
- Dragić Ruparić (fl. 1430), nobleman, despot's negotiator during War of Konavle
- Nikola Ptičić (fl. 1439), despot's emissary from Novo Brdo to Hungarian court
- Petar Span (fl. 1441), nobleman in despot's entourage during exile in Dubrovnik in 1441.
- Lješ (Aleksa) Span (fl. 1446), vojvoda of Novo Brdo, son of Peter, also in despot's service. Had two brothers Božidar and Hrvoje.
- Radič Kužević (fl. 1446), vojvoda, member of despot Đurađ's embassy to welcome his future daughter-in-law Jelena Paleolog
- Radoje Tvrtković (fl. 1446), vojvoda, also present on Jelena Paleolog's arrival in Dubrovnik
- Ivan (fl. 1446), despot's negotiator during peace talks between Dubrovnik and herceg Stjepan Vukčić Kosača
- Oliver (fl. 1451), ambassador in Dubrovnik
- Vukosav Dobrojević (fl. 1450), kefalija of Trepča
- Nikola Radulinović (fl. 1445–1459), merchant from Dubrovnik, despot Đurađ's trustee on several occasions
- Brajan (fl. 1453), vojvoda of Srebrenica
- Grgur Vlah, vojvoda Nikola and čelnik Radoslav, despot's witnesses when mine Rudište near Belgrade was granted to Janos Hunyadi in 1453.
- Vukašin Lipić (fl. 1443), court man of despot Đurađ
- Đuro Srdić (fl. 1443), court member
- Bratić (fl. 1441), court member
- Petar (fl. 1417), vojvoda (duke)
- Bogdan Zlokunić (fl. 1444), counselor
- Vladislav (fl. 1429), vojvoda, holder of "Seel" estate in the vicinity of Kovin
- Mihailo (fl. 1439), vojvoda, also holder of "Seel" estate in the vicinity of Kovin
- Nikola Skobaljić (fl. 1454), vojvoda. Lord of Zelen-grad.
- Gojčin Crnojević (fl. 1444–51).
- Stefan Ratković (fl. 1450–1458), veliki logotet.
- Mihailo Anđelović (fl. 1458), veliki čelnik
- Marko Altomanović (fl. 1457), vojvoda (duke)
- Hrnjko, vojvoda (duke) in fortress of Novo Brdo
- Prijezda (fl. 1438), vojvoda (duke) in Novo Brdo
- Oliver Kosijer, knez (comes) in Rudnik

Despot Lazar Branković

- Stefan Zahić (fl. 1457), court man of despot Lazar Branković
- Paskoje Ćeljubinović (fl. 1457–1459), trustee of despot Lazar
- Radoslav (fl. 1457), treasurer

Despot Stefan Branković

- Bogdan Čokeša (fl. 1458), nobleman

== See also ==
- Serbian noble titles in the Middle Ages
- Sebri, lower-half social class, commoners, in the medieval Serbian state

== Sources ==
- Blagojević, Miloš (2001). Državna uprava u srpskim srednjovekovnim zemljama (in Serbian) (2nd ed.). Belgrade: Službeni list SRJ. ISBN 9788635504971.
- Blagojević, Miloš (2004). Nemanjići i Lazarevići i srpska srednjovekovna državnost (in Serbian). Zavod za udžbenike i nastavna sredstva. ISBN 9788617121882.
- Ćirković, Sima; Mihaljčić, Rade (1999). Лексикон српског средњег века (in Serbian). Knowledge. ISBN 9788683233014.
- Ćorović, Vladimir (2001). Istorija srpskog naroda (in Serbian) (Internet ed.). Belgrade: Ars Libri.
- Dinić, Mihailo; Ćirković, Sima (1978). Српске земље у средњем веку: историјско-географске студије (in Serbian). Српска књижевна задруга.
- Fine, John Van Antwerp Jr. (1991) [1983]. The Early Medieval Balkans: A Critical Survey from the Sixth to the Late Twelfth Century. University of Michigan Press. ISBN 978-0-472-08149-3.
- Fine, John Van Antwerp Jr. (1994) [1987]. The Late Medieval Balkans: A Critical Survey from the Late Twelfth Century to the Ottoman Conquest. University of Michigan Press. ISBN 978-0-472-08260-5.
- Janković, Dragoslav (1961). Istorija države i prava feudalne Srbije, XII-XV vek (in Serbian). Naućna knjiga.
- Jevtić, Dragoš; Popović, Dragoljub (2000). Narodna pravna istorija (in Serbian). Savremena administracija. ISBN 9788638706181.
- Mandić, Svetislav (1986). Velika gospoda sve srpske zemlje i drugi prosopografski prilozi (in Serbian). Srpska književna zadruga. ISBN 9788637900122.
- Mihaljčić, Rade; Steindorff, Ludwig (1982). Namentragende Steininschriften in Jugoslawien vom Ende des 7. bis zur Mitte des 13. Jahrhunderts. Steiner Franz Verlag. ISBN 978-3-515-03873-7.
- Mijatović, Čedomilj (1880). Despot Đurađ Branković gospodar Srbima, Podunavlju i Zetskom primorju (in Serbian). Državna štamparija Beograd.
- Орбин, Мавро (1968). Краљевство Словена. Београд: Српска књижевна задруга.
- Orbini, Mauro (1601). Il Regno de gli Slavi hoggi corrottamente detti Schiavoni. Pesaro: Apresso Girolamo Concordia.
- Purković, Miodrag (1985). Srpska kultura srednjega veka (in Serbian). Izd. Srpske pravoslavne eparhije za zapadnu Evropu.
- Šarkić, Srđan (1996). Srednjovekovno srpsko pravo (in Serbian). Matica srpska. ISBN 9788636303696.
- Spremić, Momčilo (1994). Despot Đurađ Branković i njegovo doba (in Serbian). Srpska književna zadruga Beograd.
