= Ivanis =

Ivanis may refer to:

== People ==
- Ivaniš (magnate) (fl. 1348), Serbian magnate (despot), Dušan's relative, governor in Toplica
- Ivaniš Berislavić (died 1514), Despot of Serbia
- Ivaniš Horvat (died 1394), Croatian nobleman
- Ivaniš Korvin (1473–1504), illegitimate son of Matthias Corvinus, King of Hungary
- Ivaniš Nelipić (1379–1435), Croatian nobleman
- Ivaniš Paližna (died 1391), Croatian knight

== Places ==
- Ivăniș, a village in Întregalde, Romania
