= Dabiživ =

Dabiživ (Serbian: Дабижив) is an old Serbian male given name, derived from the sentence da bi bio živ ("to be alive"), documented since the Middle Ages. The female form is Dabiživa. It may refer to:

- Dabiživ Spandulj, (fl. 1375–76), kefalija ("chief") of Strumica
- Dabiživ Čihorić (fl. 1345), nobleman serving Stefan Dušan in Trebinje
- Dabiživ Nenčić (fl. 1383–99), župan, son of Nenac and Radača, mentioned as a neighbour to the Ragusans
- Dabiživ, a son of Jovan Oliver

== See also ==
- Dabiša
