= Borilović =

Borilović (Serbian Cyrillic: Бориловић) is a Montenegrin surname, a patronymic derived from the Slavic given name Boril. It may refer to:

- Gradislav Borilović (14th century), kaznac and vojvoda
- Vučko Borilović (1988–2022), perpetrator of the 2022 Cetinje shooting

== See also ==
- Borilovići, settlement
