= Gradislav Borilović =

Serbian magnate

- vojvoda (general) veliki vojvoda or stegonoša (standard-bearer) kaznac (financial office) tepčija (financial office)
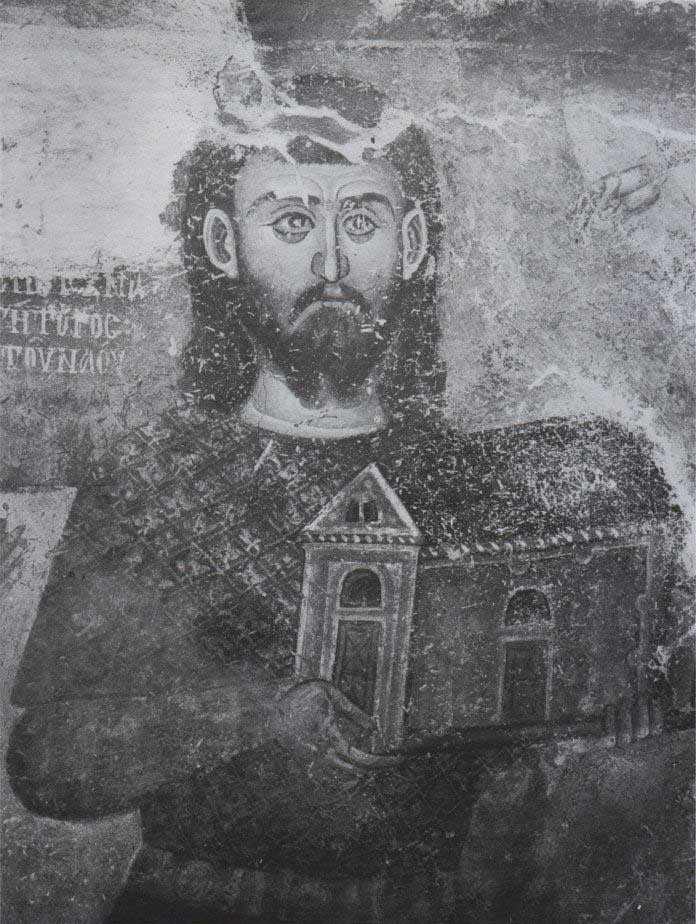
- ktetor portrait in the Treskavec Monastery.
- Died: After 1352
- Buried: Treskavec Monastery

Gradislav Borilović (Serbian Cyrillic: Градислав Бориловић, Greek: Μποριλοβίκης; fl. 1325–1352) was a Serbian magnate in the service of Stefan Uroš III Dečanski (r. 1321–1331) and Stefan Dušan (r. 1331–1355), having the titles of vojvoda (general), kaznac, and tepčija (the latter two were financial offices). Gradislav led the Serbian army that fought the Ottoman emirate at the Battle of Demotika in October 1352. The battle was fought between the allies of the two rival Byzantine Emperors, John V Palaiologos and John VI Kantakouzenos, and it was the first major battle of the Ottomans on European soil, which ended in a Serbian defeat. Greek sources spoke of Gradislav as "truly one of the most respectable among the Serbs".

== Service under Stefan Uroš III ==
Metropolitan Arsenije of Prizren, kaznac Baldovin, vojvoda Gradislav, župan Vratko, knez Grgur Kurjaković, stavilac Miloš, vojvoda Dejan Manjak, Gradislav Sušenica, Nikola Buća, and archdeacon Marin Baranić, all signed the document issued by Stefan Uroš III, dated 22 January 1325, for the sale of Ston and Pelješac to the Republic of Ragusa; the two possessions were officially handed over in 1333. The title of vojvoda was the supreme court title at the time (the hierarchy being stavilac, čelnik, kaznac, tepčija and vojvoda).

In 1330, an alliance was formed by Bulgaria and the Byzantine Empire, which sought to invade Serbia. In 1330, Young King Dušan defeated Bulgarian Emperor Michael III Shishman at Velbazhd, after which King Uroš III appointed his nephew Ivan Stefan at the Bulgarian throne in August. Uroš III now had the chance to attack the Byzantines, but chose not to, resulting in the alienation of much of the nobility that sought expansion to the south. This resulted in a conflict between Uroš III and his son, which ended with Dušan being crowned King in September 1331. Gradislav, as some other magnates which had served Uroš III (e.g. Vojvoda Vojin, Đuraš Ilijić), supported Dušan in this conflict.

== Service under Stefan Dušan ==
Gradislav is mentioned in 1333 as a vexillifer (stegonoša, "standard-bearer", equivalent of veliki vojvoda). That title had earlier been bestowed upon Mladen and Vojin. In c. 1337, he donated a village to the Treskavec Monastery, which had been renovated by Stefan Dušan. He was mentioned with the court title tepčija in Dušan's second charter to Treskavec, dated some time between 1336 and 1345.

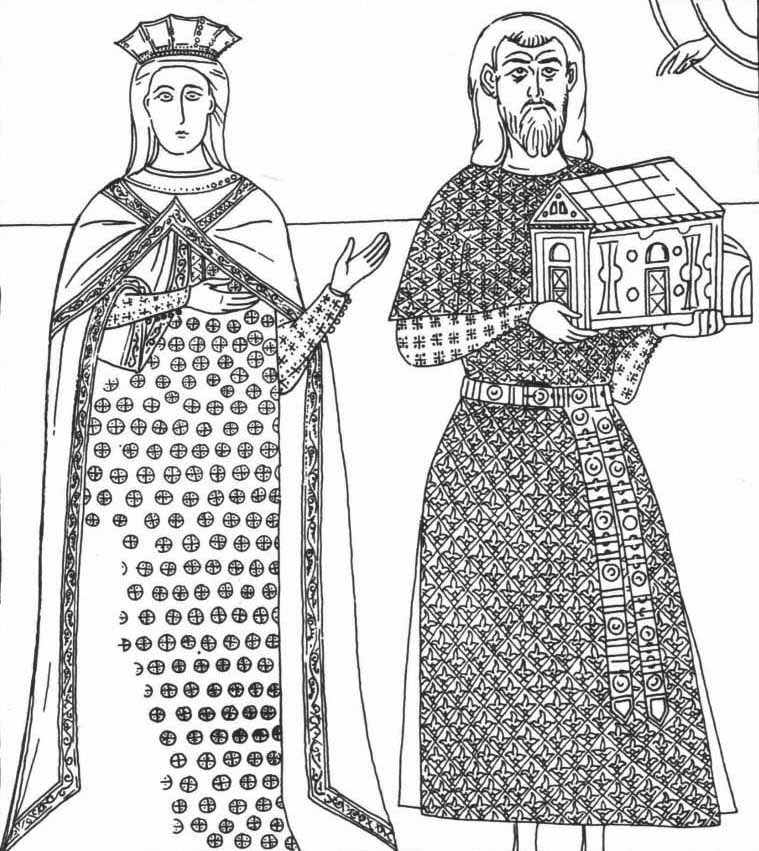
ktitor portraits of Gradislav and his wife.

During the Byzantine civil war of 1341–1347 between the regency of John Palaiologos and John Kantakouzenos, the latter allied himself with the Turkic Aydin and Ottoman emirates, and initially also with Stefan Dušan (1342–43). Dušan however switched sides and expanded his domains into Byzantine territory. The Aydin emirate defeated the Serbian army at Stephaniana (1344), but it was not able to thwart Dušan's conquest of Macedonia and Epirus. During these events, tepčija Gradislav was mentioned alongside Konstantin Sevastokratorović and kastrophylax Dragman.

On April 16, 1346, Dušan was proclaimed "Emperor and autocrat of Serbs" by Serbian Patriarch Joanikije II. The Byzantine war ended with a political victory for Kantakouzenos, who was recognized as senior emperor for ten years, after which he and Palaiologos would reign as equals. Dušan continued in a war with Kantakouzenos, whose son Matthew, now stripped of his inheritance, set up a semi-autonomous polity in western Thrace, a march against Serbia.

In the Byzantine civil war which began in 1352, John Palaiologos obtained the help of Serbia, while John Kantakouzenos sought help from Orhan I, the Ottoman bey. Kantakouzenos marched into Thrace to rescue his son, Matthew, who was attacked by Palaiologos shortly after being given this appanage and then refusing to recognize John Palaiologos as heir to the throne. The Ottoman troops retook some cities that had surrendered to John Palaiologos, and Kantakouzenos allowed them to plunder, including Adrianople, thus it seemed that Kantakouzenos was defeating John Palaiologos, who now retreated to Serbia. Emperor Stefan Dušan sent Palaiologos a cavalry force of 4,000 or 6,000 under the command of Gradislav (mentioned as "Borilović the kaznac" (Κασνιτζὸς ό Μποριλοβίκης), Naumov believe that this "kaznac Borilović" was in fact his brother or a close relative) while Orhan I provided Kantakouzenos 10,000 horsemen. The two armies met at an open-field battle near Demotika (modern Didymoteicho) in October 1352, which would decide the fate of the Byzantine Empire, without the direct involvement of the Byzantines. The more numerous Ottomans defeated the Serbs, and Kantakouzenos retained the power, while Palaiologos fled to Venetian Tenedos. According to Kantakouzenos about 7,000 Serbs fell at the battle (deemed exaggerated), while Nikephoros Gregoras (1295–1360) gave the number as 4,000. The battle was the first major battle of the Ottomans on European soil, and it made Stefan Dušan realize the major threat of the Ottomans to Eastern Europe.

He was buried in the Treskavec Monastery, which include ktitor portraits of him and his wife. It is not known when exactly he had acquired the title of tepčija, though it was most likely at the end of his life.

== See also ==
- Gradislav Vojšić, čelnik

== Annotations ==
1. Name: The first attestation of his name is Gradislav (Градислав). He is next mentioned as Borilović (Бориловић).

Military offices
Preceded by Mladen and Vojin as serving Stefan Uroš III	standard-bearer of Stefan Dušan fl. 1333; With: Jovan Oliver	Succeeded by
Preceded by Mladen, Vojin, Dejan Manjak, as serving Stefan Uroš III	vojvoda of Stefan Dušan; 1331 – 1352; With: Dejan Manjak (fl. 1333); Hrelja (1331–42); Vojin (1331–47); Vojihna (1331–55); Preljub (1344–55); Vratko Nemanjić (1331–55)	Succeeded by Vukašin
Court offices
Preceded by Baldovin as serving Stefan Uroš III	kaznac of Stefan Dušan fl. 1352; With: Pribac (1331–55)	Succeeded by Bogdan
Preceded by Mišljen as veliki tepčija of Stefan Dečanski	tepčija of Stefan Dušan ?	Succeeded by ?
