= Dobravac =

Serbian nobleman of 13th century

Dobravac (Serbian Cyrillic: Добравац; fl. 1280) or Dobravec (Добравец) was a Serbian nobleman serving in the crown land of Hum, with the title of tepčija. He is mentioned in a document dated 1280 as serving the countess of Hum (Moysa serviens Dobraveçi tepçi domine comitisse de Chelmo). He had a clerk or assistant, Mojše, who sold two of his bondmaids in Ragusa (Dubrovnik) that year. Although Dobravac's jurisdiction is unknown from the quotation, he was not a veliki tepčija (serving the king directly); his office was limited to the Hum land, but his type of work was the same as that of the veliki tepčija. The tepčija had executive authorities; his otroci (sing. otrok), were servants, lesser in rank but not slaves.

== Annotations ==
The name is an old Serbian name, found in medieval epigraphy.

== Sources ==
- Blagojević, Miloš (2001). Državna uprava u srpskim srednjovekovnim zemljama (in Serbian). Službeni list SRJ. ISBN 9788635504971.

Court offices
Vacant Title last held by ?	tepčija of Hum fl. 1280	Vacant Title next held by ?
