= Prokathemenos =

Greek political term

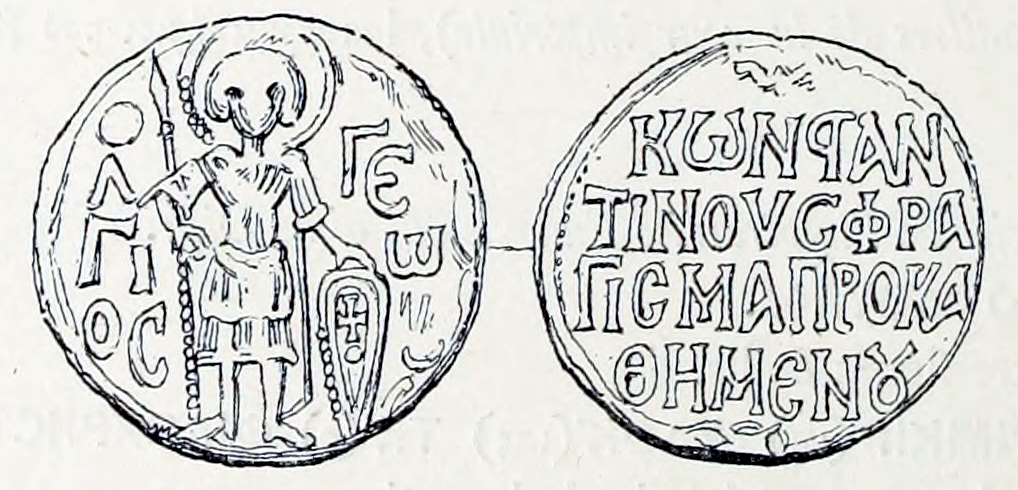
Seal of the prokathemenos Constantine, with St. George on the obverse (Palaiologan period). Legend: Ο ΑΓΙΟC ΓΕΩΡΓΙΟC / ΚΩΝCΤΑΝΤΙΝΟΥ CΦΡΑΓΙCΜΑ ΠΡΟΚΑΘΗΜΕΝΟΥ.

Prokathemenos (Greek: προκαθήμενος, lit. 'the presiding one') is a Greek term for a president or chairman.

In the Byzantine Empire, the term appeared in a technical use during the 12th century. In the central administration, the prokathemenos of the demosiaka dikasteria (state courts) is attested since 1166. This was one of the four highest tribunals of the Komnenian period, along with those headed by the protasekretis, the dikaiodotes, and the droungarios tes vigles.

In 1186, a prokathemenos of the sekreta (the financial bureaux) is recorded as being charged by Emperor Isaac II Angelos with collecting fines from those who disobeyed one of his chrysobulls. The modern historian Ernst Stein proposed to identify this office with the prokathemenos of the demosiaka dikasteria, but this is conjectural.

In addition, from the 12th century on, and particularly during the 13th and 14th centuries, the term was used for the governors of individual towns. Stein again suggested that these were civilian governors, while the garrison was commanded by a kastrophylax. In the Book of Offices of pseudo-Kodinos, written shortly after the mid-14th century, the existence of prokathemenoi for the imperial palaces, as well as of the imperial bedchamber (koiton) and the imperial wardrobe (vestiarion).

== See also ==
- Praeses
- Primicerius
- Proedros

== Sources ==
- Kazhdan, Alexander, ed. (1991). The Oxford Dictionary of Byzantium. Oxford and New York: Oxford University Press. ISBN 0-19-504652-8.
- Verpeaux, Jean, ed. (1966). Pseudo-Kodinos, Traité des Offices (in French). Paris: Éditions du Centre National de la Recherche Scientifique.
