= Otroci =

Serbian word for "children" and medieval social class

Otroci (Serbian Cyrillic: отроци) is a Serbian word literally meaning 'children' (Serbian: отрок, romanized: otrok, lit. 'child'). The meaning of the word implies a higher degree of dependence of this population category. They represented a category of dependent people who, by their legal and social standing, were at the bottom of the social ladder. In Serbian histography, the word otrok (plural otroci) has brought up many discussions. Many historians have argued about the meaning of the word otrok and its role in medieval Serbian state. Some argued that otroci were slaves, while others opposed that opinion, but both sides had arguments for their statements.

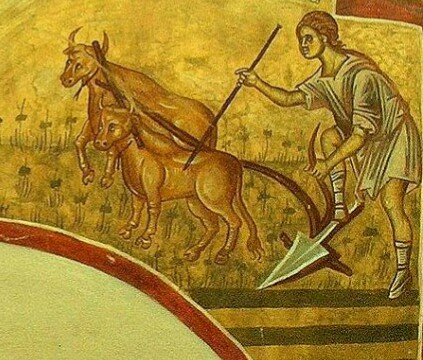
Plowman, plow and oxen. The fresco from Decani.

Dusan’s Code (Serbian: Душанов законик, Dušanov zakonik, known historically as Закон благовјернаго цара Стефана – Law of the pious Emperor Stefan) has had multiple translations during the 19th and 20th centuries (German, English, French, Polish, Russian, etc.), but it has just recently been translated to modern Serbian language—by Nikola Radojcic. He found the measure for old style and language, but he also overlooked some things, like translating the word dijak as djak (student) and the word otrok as rob (slave). The recent histography found the most fault with the translation of the word otrok as a slave. It is indisputable that otroci were the social layer without most of the rights in medieval Serbian society, but that didn’t necessarily mean equality with slaves. The fact that they didn’t claim personal rights supports the claim that otroci were slaves. Clause 72. оf Dusan’s Code anticipates that any one person who comes to the royal court reluctant should be done justice but the aristocratic otrok. So, otrok didn’t have the right to ask for mercy on the ruler’s court. Still, in smaller disputes, otrok was judged by his lord, and for the biggest crimes, they would be judged by the tzar’s judge. Also, otroci were in the eternal heritage of aristocrats, but their lord couldn’t give otrok to dowry. Based on Dusan’s Code, it can be seen that the lord of the manor and his closest family claimed the right to release an otrok. Otroci could be bought or sold on squares, the proof of that being the ban from Dusan’s Code that otrok mustn’t be sold to a person from a different religion, the severe punishment for that being mutilation – cutting off the arms and tongue. From all this, Teodor Taranovski concluded that ‘a person who is a subject of ownership of another man can’t be considered anything else but a slave. Thus, otroci are slaves.’

Slavery wasn’t a foreign term in medieval times. It is known about slaves from coastal areas and cities. However, otroci were different than them. Unlike categories of people who were dependent, but had personal freedom, otroci were completely dependent on their lord, but even then they weren’t slaves. Based on responsibilities, they were the same as meropsi. That claim is supported by clause 67. оf Dusan’s Code. Based on that, we conclude that otroci had to possess some sort of private property, which is confirmed by the fact that otroci and meropsi had land under the equal conditions of paying tribute and working. Also, lords had bigger income and profits from the work of a free settler than from the work of an unproductive slave. This also supports the claim that otroci aren’t slaves. Otroci sometimes received highly confidential duties and were trusted by their lords. Among those cases, there are otroci Nikola Vladovic and Radoslav Djurasinovic that were a part of important demarcations on monastic estates, based on the trust of their lord Oliver Golemovic. There was one more otrok, a Greek called Nikita Pedijasim, who was entrusted with important work and was trusted by his lord Jovan Ugljesa. Furthermore, Nikita was one of the courtiers on his lord’s court. Hence, the term otrok has been used in documents in a general meaning for servants, as well as helpers and trustworthy officials of their lords, clerks of church dignitaries and secular nobles, servants of monks, bubs, etc. They performed various jobs: court affairs, executive, diplomatic and financial affairs.

Thus, the term otrok has taken up different meanings over time. In our medieval documents, the term is most frequently used for settlers with no personal rights, but also people whom their lords entrust with confidential duties. Hence as such, the word otrok shouldn’t have been translated.

== See also ==
- Sebri
- Vlasi
- Meropsi
- Sokalnici
- Serbian nobility

== Sources ==
- Mihaljčić, Rade (1995) Prošlost i narodno sećanje
- Mirković, Zoran S. (2019) Srpska pravna istorija
- Đorđe Bubalo: Šta znači otrok u srpskim poveljama?, Zbornik Matice srpske za istoriju, broj 56,1997.godinе
