= Ljubimir (tepčija) =

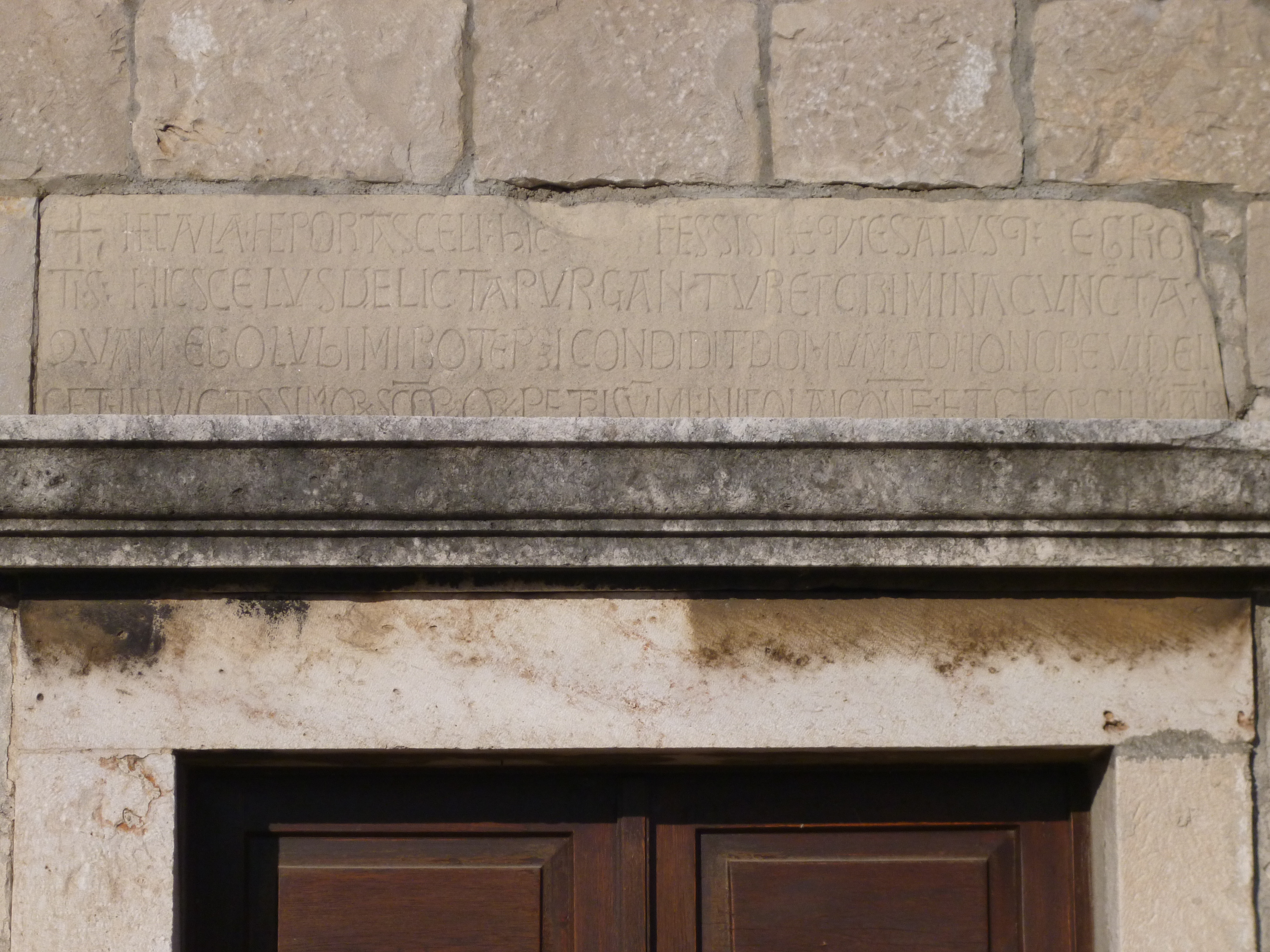
Inscription of Ljubomir in Kaštela

Ljubimir or Ljubomir was an 11th-century dignitary who served at the courts of Croatian kings as tepčija (Royal court administrator). He is best known as the founder of the Church of Saint Nicholas in Kaštela during the last quarter of the 11th century, where a stone inscription bearing his name and title exists. He is mentioned as part of a retinue of king Stephen II. Later, he was recorded to be in a fray with the ruler of Neretva, Slavac.
