= Battle of Demotika =

Part of the Byzantine civil war of 1352–1357

- Part of the Byzantine civil war of 1352–1357
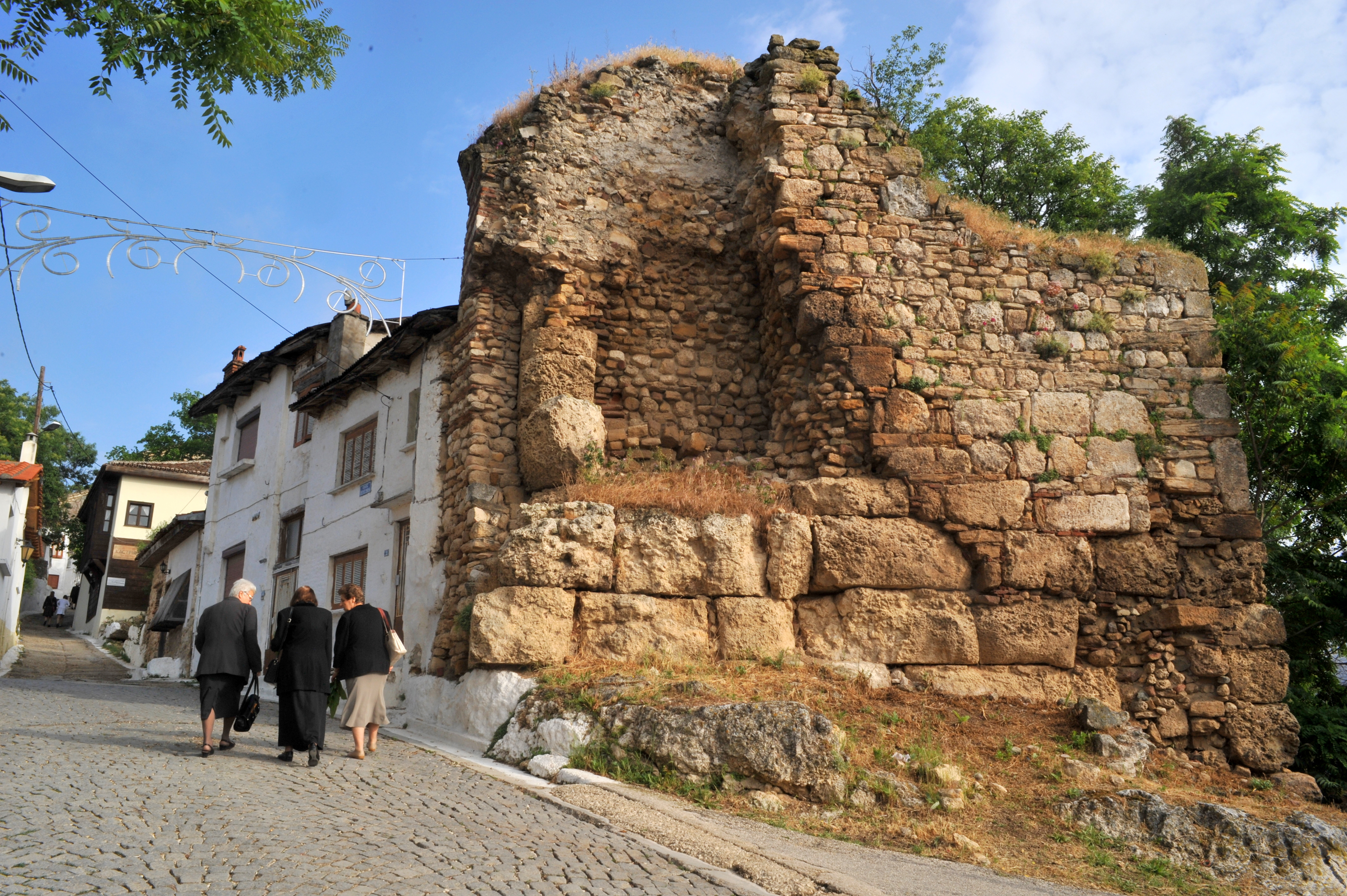
- Fortifications of Demotika
Date	October 1352
Location	Didymoteicho
Result	Ottoman victory

Belligerents
(Byzantine Empire) John V Palaiologos supported by: Serbian Empire (Second Bulgarian Empire) Bulgarian Empire	(Byzantine Empire) John VI Kantakouzenos supported by: (Ottoman Empire) Ottoman Beylik

Commanders and leaders
(Serbian Empire) Gradislav Borilović	(Ottoman Empire) Süleyman Pasha

Strength
4,000–6,000 Serbian cavalry; Bulgarian troops possibly present	10,000 Ottoman cavalry

Casualties and losses
4,000–7,000 killed	Unknown

The Battle of Demotika took place in October 1352 near Didymoteicho during the Byzantine civil war of 1352–1357. The conflict arose from renewed tensions between John V Palaiologos and John VI Kantakouzenos, whose rival claims in Thrace drew in neighbouring powers. Serbian forces supported John V, while Ottoman ones aided Kantakouzenos and his son Matthew.

Outnumbered by the Ottoman cavalry, Serbian and possibly Bulgarian units supporting John V were routed, with heavy losses reported by contemporary chroniclers. The defeat forced John V to flee to Venetian-held Tenedos, while Kantakouzenos temporarily consolidated his position.

The battle is considered the first major engagement fought by Ottoman troops on European soil. The aftermath strengthened the Ottoman presence in Thrace and preceded their 1354 occupation of Gallipoli, which gave them their first permanent foothold in Europe.

== Background ==
In the mid-14th century the Byzantine Empire was divided between the senior emperor, John VI Kantakouzenos, and his junior co-emperor and son-in-law, John V Palaiologos. The empire was further weakened by the arrival of the Black Death, which caused severe depopulation and undermined Byzantine control in several regions. As John V approached adulthood, disputes over authority strained the arrangement. To limit friction, John VI granted John V an appanage in western Thrace, while assigning his son Matthew territories around Adrianople (modern Edirne). Matthew served as governor and his position in Thrace placed him directly in conflict with John V's supporters. This redistribution triggered disagreements over borders and Matthew refused to recognise John V as heir.

== Prelude ==
War broke out in 1352, John V moved against Matthew Kantakouzenos with the help of hired Turkish mercenaries. Acting with the support of Emperor Stefan Uroš IV Dušan of the Serbian Empire, his forces besieged Adrianople before Kantakouzenos appealed to Ottoman Sultan Orhan Ghazi for assistance. Expecting retaliation, John V sought additional backing from Serbian and the Second Bulgarian Empire, sending his brother Michael Palaiologos as a hostage to secure Serbian aid.

Kantakouzenos, reinforced by Ottoman troops provided by Orhan, advanced into Thrace. Ottoman units retook towns that had acknowledged John V and were permitted to plunder them, including Adrianople. John V withdrew to Serbia, where Dušan agreed to provide cavalry to assist him.

== Battle ==
Stefan Dušan sent between 4,000 and 6,000 Serbian cavalry under Gradislav Borilović to assist John V. Orhan supplied Kantakouzenos with 10,000 Ottoman horsemen commanded by Süleyman Pasha. Historian John Fine notes that Bulgarian troops may also have been present alongside the Serbs.

The armies met in an open-field engagement near Demotika (modern Didymoteicho) in northeastern Greece, in October 1352. Fine records that the Serbs, together with any accompanying Bulgarian forces, confronted a much larger Ottoman contingent. The numerical imbalance proved decisive. In the ensuing clash the Ottomans overwhelmed their opponents, and the allied force under John V broke and fled. The result ensured that Kantakouzenos retained control of the government and could continue to distribute appanages as he wished.

Contemporary accounts differ on the scale of losses: Kantakouzenos claimed that about 7,000 Serbs were killed, while Nikephoros Gregoras recorded a figure of roughly 4,000. John V escaped the defeat and withdrew to the Venetian-held island of Tenedos to continue his resistance. The encounter is widely regarded as the first major Ottoman victory over European forces on European soil, and its outcome alerted Dušan to the growing Ottoman threat in the Balkans.

== Aftermath ==
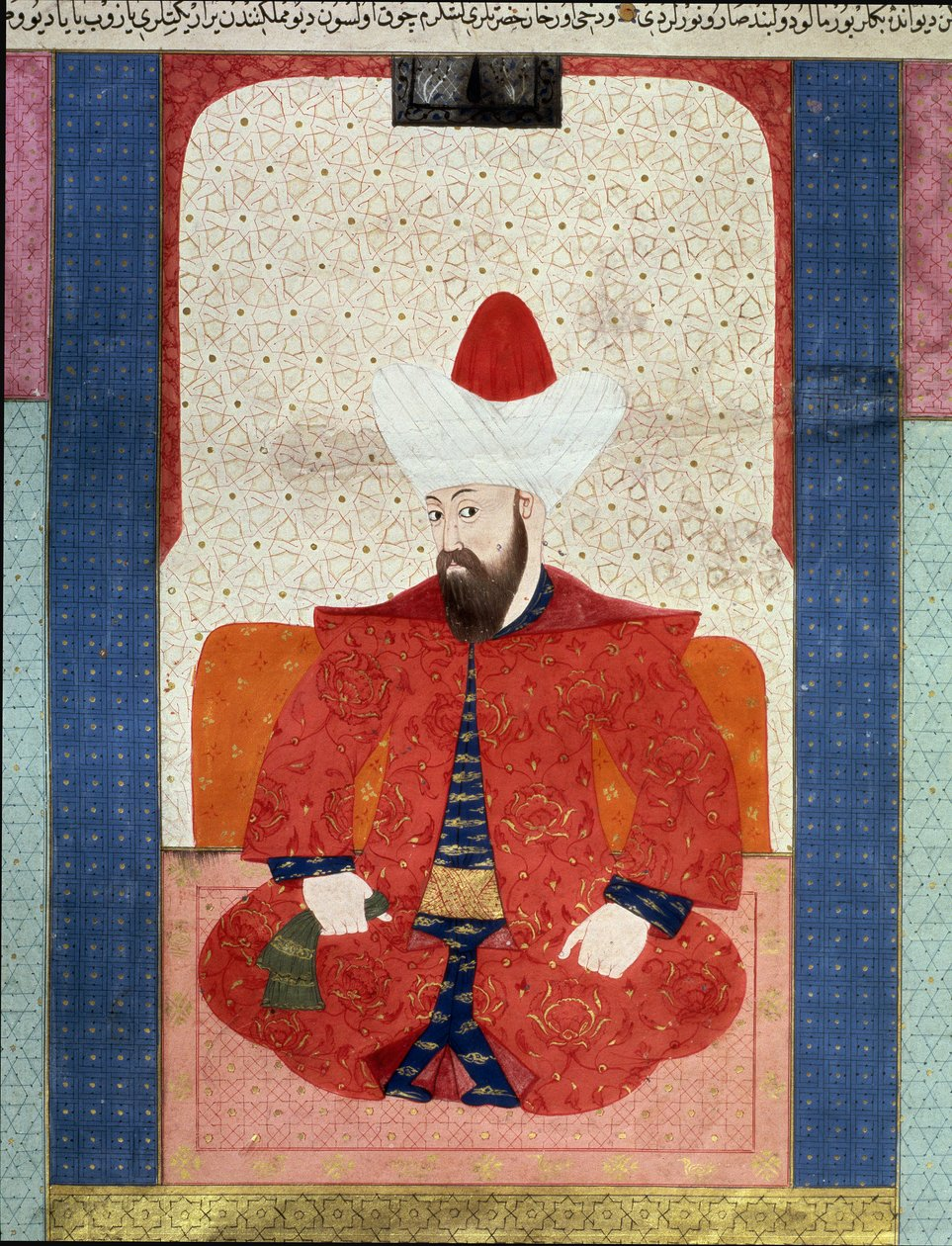
Ottoman Sultan Orhan whose troops fought alongside John VI Kantakouzenos at the Battle of Demotika

While raiding Thrace in the aftermath of the battle, Orhan's son Süleyman took control of the nearby stronghold of Tzympe, establishing an Ottoman presence on the European side of the Dardanelles. Ottoman activity in Thrace increased over the next two years, culminating in the occupation of the Byzantine fortress of Gallipoli in 1354 after an earthquake damaged its walls. From Tenedos, John V attempted to seize Constantinople in March 1353, but his effort failed. John VI responded by deposing him and elevating Matthew as co-emperor, yet Kantakouzenos was increasingly blamed for bringing the Ottomans into the empire's internal disputes. Ottoman expansion continued after these events, as Orhan no longer had obligations to John V and pursued his own interests in Europe.

In 1354 John VI abdicated and retired to monastic life, while John V returned to Constantinople and defeated Matthew the following year, compelling him to renounce his claims. For the Ottomans, Demotika and the seizure of Gallipoli marked the establishment of a permanent European bridgehead, from which they expanded across Thrace and launched further raids into the Balkans.

== Sources ==
- Ágoston, Gábor (12 September 2023). The Last Muslim Conquest: The Ottoman Empire and Its Wars in Europe. Princeton University Press. ISBN 978-0-691-20539-7.
- Bayrı, Buket Kitapçı (11 November 2019). Warriors, Martyrs, and Dervishes: Moving Frontiers, Shifting Identities in the Land of Rome (13th–15th Centuries). BRILL. ISBN 978-90-04-41584-3.
- Ćorović, Vladimir (2001) [1997]. Istorija srpskog naroda (in Serbian) (Internet ed.). Belgrade: Ars Libri.
- Fajfrić, Željko (2000) [1998], Sveta loza Stefana Nemanje (in Serbian) (Internet ed.), Belgrade: Janus; Rastko., chapter 40
- Fine, John Van Antwerp (1994). The Late Medieval Balkans: A Critical Survey from the Late Twelfth Century to the Ottoman Conquest. Ann Arbor: University of Michigan Press. ISBN 978-0-472-08260-5.
- Vizantološki institut (1986). Vizantijski izvori za istoriju naroda Jugoslavije. Vol. 6. Vizantološki institut (Srpska akademija nauka i umetnosti). pp. 522, 553.
- Tucker, Spencer C. (16 February 2017). The Roots and Consequences of Civil Wars and Revolutions: Conflicts That Changed World History. Bloomsbury Publishing USA. ISBN 978-1-4408-4294-8.
