= Krajina Belojević =

Serbian noble

- chieftain and župan of Travunia
- Period: ca. 847–891
- Predecessor: Beloje, his father
- Successor: Hvalimir, his son
- Born: Trebinje
- Family: Belojević
- Issue: Hvalimir
- Father: Beloje

Krajina Belojević (Serbian: Крајина, Greek: Κράινα), was the 9th century local Slavic chieftain from the region surrounding Trebinje, who ruled the area with a title of župan. The same region centered on Trebinje, also known as Travunia, was earlier ruled by Krajina's father, the local lord Beloje. At the time of Krajina's rule, the region was still under suzerainty of the Principality of Serbia, and he was in vassal relation to its ruling Vlastimirović's. In 847/848, after the Bulgarian–Serbian War (839–842), victorious Prince Vlastimir of Serbia (r. ca. 836-850) married his unnamed daughter to Krajina, thus elevating his and his province rank. In doing so his father-in-law, eponymous founder of the Vlastimirović's, dynasty which rule Serbia until 969, granted them independence. Although Krajina's father sought to free himself and his province from Serbian suzerainty, and though Krajina succeeded in achieving that goal through marriage with Vlastimir's daughter, he continued to serve in office as župan under Mutimir (r. 850–891). With the Vlastimir's daughter Krajina had a son that would succeed him, Hvalimir (Greek: Φαλιμἑρης). Hvalimir in turn had a son, Čučimir (Greek: Τζουτζημέρης; r. first half of 10th century), who was the last known Belojević in charge of Travunia before it was annexed by the Byzantines.

== See also ==
- Drosaico and Ljudislav (fl. 836-840), župans of Narentia who defeated Venetian doge, Pietro Tradonico (r. 836–864), and hundreds of his men in 839/840

Royal titles
Titles of nobility
Preceded by Beloje	Župan of Travunia; Under Vlastimir (Serbian Principality) fl. 847/848	Succeeded by Hvalimir

== Notes ==
1. Name: The first attestation of his name is the Greek Κράινα (Kraina), in Serbian this is rendered as Krajina (Крајина) and Latin: Krainas. His given name is also rendered as Kraina, while his surname as Belić. According to name culture, his full name was Krajina Belojević. His name means "frontier" (see krajina), derived from the word kraj, which means "province", "region", "territory" or "end".
2. Time: The exact time of his office is unknown, although it most likely would have begun when he married the daughter of Vlastimir, in 847/848, and continued throughout the rule of Vlastimir's successor, Mutimir (r. 850-891).

== Sources ==
- Moravcsik, Gyula, ed. (1967) [1949]. Constantine Porphyrogenitus: De Administrando Imperio (2nd revised ed.). Washington D.C.: Dumbarton Oaks Center for Byzantine Studies. ISBN 9780884020219.
- Ćirković, Sima (2004). The Serbs. Malden: Blackwell Publishing. ISBN 9781405142915.
- Curta, Florin (2006). Southeastern Europe in the Middle Ages, 500–1250. Cambridge: Cambridge University Press.
- Fine, John Van Antwerp Jr. (1991) [1983]. The Early Medieval Balkans: A Critical Survey from the Sixth to the Late Twelfth Century. Ann Arbor, Michigan: University of Michigan Press. ISBN 0472081497.
- Živković, Tibor (2006). Portreti srpskih vladara: IX - XII vek (in Serbian). Beograd: Zavod za Udžbenike i Nastavna Sredstva. pp. 11–15. ISBN 86-17-13754-1.
- Božidar Ferjančić, „Vizantijski izvori za istoriju naroda Jugoslavije II“ (fototipsko izdanje originala iz 1959), Beograd, 2007. ISBN 978-86-83883-08-0 (str. 62) (in Serbian)
- Grupa autora, „Istorija srpskog naroda I“, Beograd, 1981. (str. 148) (in Serbian)
- Andrija Veselinović, Radoš Ljušić, „Srpske dinastije“, Novi Sad, 2001. ISBN 86-83639-01-0 (str. 24) (in Serbian)
- P. Radonjić, „Velaj“, u: Srpski biografski rečnik, II tom, ur. Čedomir Popov, Novi Sad 2008, str. 109-110. (in Serbian)
- Vizantološki institut (1997). Recueil de travaux de l'Institut des études byzantines (in Serbian). Vol. 36. Naučno delo. ISBN 978-86-83883-13-4.
