= Domanek =

- Prince of Travunia (in rivalry with royal dynasty)
- Reign: ca 1054
- Predecessor: Gojislav (1st); Saganek (2nd)
- Successor: Saganek (1st); Radoslav (2nd)

Domanek (Serbian Cyrillic: Доманек; Latin: Domanec; fl. 1054–55) was a local Slavic chieftain from the region surrounding Trebinje. After a revolt and the murder of earlier ruler of Travunia (ca. 1054–1055), the rebel chieftains made Domanek their leader and a ruler of Travunia.

== Life ==
According to the Chronicle of the Priest of Dioclea, when Stefan Vojislav, the Grand Prince of Duklja, died, the lands were divided between his widow and five sons. Gojislav received the Trebinje region. The local nobles eventually rose up and killed him. The nobles then set up one of their own, Domanek, as prince, in ca. 1054.

Mihailo I, the holder of Duklja (the crownland), and two of his brothers, led an attack into Travunia, capturing the murderers and giving "them a horrible death". Domanek fled the lands, and Saganek, another brother of Mihailo, succeeded as the rightful Prince of Travunia. Domanek returned shortly after Mihailo's departure, and expelled Saganek. Mihailo offered the office to Radoslav, who declined, afraid of losing Luška župa (future Zeta). Radoslav perhaps distrusted his brother, thinking he would seize Zeta, but Mihailo seems to have offered him a deal.

The Byzantine Empire, wanting to take advantage of the death of Stefan Vojislav, prepared an offensive against unstable Duklja. At this time, the four remaining brothers made peace and established an alliance. The treaty concluded is the oldest in Serbian history. After the agreement, Radoslav attacked Trebinje, killing Domanek. Radoslav went on to conquer Zahumlje.
