= Beloje =

- župan of Travunia
- Period: before 839
- Predecessor: Unknown
- Successor: Krajina
- Born: Travunia
- Died: 9th century
- Family: Belojević dynasty
- Issue: Krajina

Beloje (Serbian Cyrillic: Белоје; Greek: Βελάης; fl. 839), was a local Slavic chieftain from the region surrounding Trebinje, who ruled the area with a title of župan, sometime in the first half of the 9th century. Travunia was a polity centered in Trebinje (now in southern Bosnia and Herzegovina), and at the time subject to the Principality of Serbia. Mentioned in De Administrando Imperio (DAI) of Byzantine Emperor Constantine VII (r. 945–959), Beloje was a contemporary of Serbian ruler Vlastimir (r. 836–851). It is unknown how he came to the position; it might have been through the primogeniture principles, however, there is no definite answer. Vlastimir married his daughter to Beloje's son Krajina, and "desiring to ennoble his son-in-law", elevated his rank to archon (prince) and made him independent. Travunia was thus elevated from a župa into an archonty (principality), practically independent, while Vlastimir oversaw his son-in-law. T. Živković theorized that Beloje sought to free himself of Serbian rule, and that Vlastimir prevented this through a political marriage between the two families, possibly prior to the Bulgar–Serb War (839–842). Krajina's descendants were entitled the rule of Travunia under Serbian suzerainty.

There is a hypothesis that the legendary king Pavlimir Belo (or Belimir) mentioned in the Chronicle of the Priest of Duklja (CPD) was supposedly based on Beloje. The CPD is a primary source dating to ca. 1300–10 largely discredited in historiography (events in the Early Middle Ages deemed useless). The CPD mentions this individual, Belo, as being born as Pavlimir, receiving his nickname from his relatives and other Romans from bello, "because he very much loved war". The legend of Pavlimir-Belo continues with his stint at Syrmia, where he defeated the Syrmians and Hungarians, and his defeat of Rascian župan Ljutomir. Belo is mentioned in the CPD as a Rascian župan, while DAI mentions Beloje as a Travunian župan. N. Banašević noted that while the two names were similar, they were not identical.

== Annotations ==
1. In DAI, his name is spelt in Greek as Βελάης, transliterated Belaës by Moravcsik 1967. His name is rendered in Serbian as Beloje (Белоје) or Veloje (Велоје). The name "Beloje" is derived from belo (white). "Veloje" is derived from Slavic anthroponymic vel- (great, from veliko) and the common Slavic possessive suffix -je.

== Sources ==
- Moravcsik, Gyula, ed. (1967) [1949]. Constantine Porphyrogenitus: De Administrando Imperio (2nd revised ed.). Washington D.C.: Dumbarton Oaks Center for Byzantine Studies. ISBN 9780884020219. (Primary)
- Banašević, Nikola (1971). Летопис Попа Дукльанина и народна предања. Srpska književna zadruga.
- Bešić, Zarija M. (1967). Istorija Crne Gore: Od najstarijih vremena do kraja XII vijeka. Red. za istoriju Crne Gore. OCLC 16572564.
- Blagojević, Miloš (2001). Državna uprava u srpskim srednjovekovnim zemljama (2nd ed.). Službeni list SRJ. ISBN 9788635504971.
- Ćirković, Sima (2004). The Serbs. Malden: Blackwell Publishing. ISBN 9781405142915.
- Curta, Florin (2006). Southeastern Europe in the Middle Ages, 500–1250. Cambridge: Cambridge University Press.
- Fine, John Van Antwerp Jr. (1991) [1983]. The Early Medieval Balkans: A Critical Survey from the Sixth to the Late Twelfth Century. Ann Arbor, Michigan: University of Michigan Press. ISBN 0472081497.
- Istorijski muzej Srbije (1977). Zbornik Istorijskog muzeja Srbije. Vol. 13–14. Istorijski muzej Srbije.
- Vizantološki institut (1997). Recueil de travaux de l'Institut des études byzantines (in Serbian). Vol. 36. Naučno delo.
- Srejović, Dragoslav; Gavrilović, Slavko; Ćirković, Sima M. (1982). Istorija srpskog naroda: knj. Od najstarijih vremena do Maričke bitke (1371). Srpska književna zadruga.
- Veselinović, Andrija; Ljušić, Radoš (2008). Srpske dinastije. Službeni glasnik. ISBN 978-86-7549-921-3.
- Živković, Tibor (2006). Portreti srpskih vladara (IX—XII vek). Belgrade. ISBN 86-17-13754-1.
- Živković, Tibor (2008). Forging unity: The South Slavs between East and West 550-1150. Belgrade: The Institute of History, Čigoja štampa. ISBN 9788675585732.
- Živković, T.; Kunčer, D. (2009). Gesta regum Sclavorum, I–II. Београд: Историјски институт, Манастир Острог.
