= Dabiživ Čihorić =

- sluga
- Born: before 1334
- Died: January 1362
- Buried: Treskavac monastery near Prilep
- Family: Čihorić
- Occupation: Serbian royal deputy; governor of Trebinje and Konavle; cup-bearer

Dabiživ Čihorić (Serbian Cyrillic: Дабижив Чихорић; fl. 1334 – died January 1362) was a Serbian nobleman who served king and emperor Stefan Dušan (r. 1331–55) and emperor Uroš V (r. 1355–71), with the title of sluga. He was not a usual sluga (a cup-bearer), but had the same responsibilities as those with kaznac or tepčija titles. A member of the Čihorić family (also called Drugović), a powerful family in the Trebinje region, his brothers Vratko and Nenac held the title of župan (count), while Stepko held the title of tepčija. Dabiživ was present in the hinterland of Dubrovnik between 1334 and 1349, but was first mentioned with the title of sluga in 1343 (Dabiseo sluga). That mention is of him together with the Ragusan rector Marco Mauroceno and "elders" (starce), establishing boundaries between the territories of the Republic of Ragusa and Trebinje, by extension with the Kingdom of Serbia. In 1345 the Ragusan ministers complained to Stefan Dušan that Dabiživ had imposed a customs tax at Trebinje, one dinar per each goods load that passed by. Stefan Dušan abolished this tax, as known from a letter dated 26 October 1346, sent from Serres. Dabiživ's competences are explained by the fact, that he acted as the royal deputy in Trebinje and Konavle. Earlier, in 1330, the governor of Konavle and the wider area of Trebinje was župan Hlapen. It is assumed that Dabiživ was part of the preparations of organizing a special court for "young king" Uroš V, that while he governed Trebinje he was chosen to be the sluga of Uroš V. In 1346, Uglješa Mrnjavčević became the deputy in Trebinje and Konavle. After the coronation of Stefan Dušan as emperor (1346), when Uroš V became king and co-ruler, Dabiživ left Trebinje to be in the nearest circle of Uroš V, whom he served faithfully until his death in January 1362. Dabiživ was buried at the Treskavac monastery near Prilep, his grave inscription mentioning him as the enohijar (which according to S. Novaković was the brewer or cellarer, that is, a cup-bearer) of emperor Uroš V.

Dabiživ Čihorić "the younger" (fl. 1383–1402), a nobleman in Popovo, was Dabiživ's relative, likely nephew (as the son of Nenac).

== Sources ==
- Blagojević, Miloš (2001). Државна управа у српским средњовековним земљама [State administration in the Serb medieval lands]. Službeni list SRJ. pp. 33–34, 43. ISBN 9788635504971.
- Jireček, Konstantin (1959) [1892]. "Властела хумска на натпису у Величанима". Зборник Константина Јиречека. 1. Научно дело: 425–432.
- Korać, Vojislav (1966). Trebinje: istorijski pregled. Vol. 1. Zavičajni muzej. p. 122.
- Novaković, Stojan (1908). "Византијски чинови и титуле у српским земљама XI-XV века". Глас СКА. LXXVIII: 178–280.
- Smiljanić, Aranđel (2009). "Писмо Дабижива Чихорића Дубровчанима" (PDF). Грађа о прошлости Босне. 2: 45–51.
- Stojanović, Ljubomir (1929). Старе српске повеље и писма. Vol. 1. Beograd–Sremski Karlovci.

Court offices
First	sluga of Uroš V fl. 1346–62	Succeeded by ?
Preceded by Jovan Oliver as veliki sluga	sluga of Stefan Dušan fl. 1343–46	Succeeded by Pribac as veliki sluga
Other offices
Preceded by Hlapen	Serbian royal deputy of Trebinje and Konavle fl. 1343–46	Succeeded by Uglješa
