= Hardomil =

Serbian nobleman

Hardomil (Serbian Cyrillic: Хардомил; d. before 1327) was a Serbian nobleman that served king Stefan Milutin (r. 1282–1321), with the title of tepčija. He was mentioned as deceased in 1327, in a litigation between his sons' estates and Hilandar. His sons inherited notable land property, which evidents his social status and property state, but not his jurisdiction. The judgement established that his sons, Dmitar and Borislav (called the Hardomilić brothers in historiography), had unlawfully used Hilandar's property, and thus the property was returned to Hilandar. Hardomil was succeeded by Vladoje (fl. 1326), who served king Stefan Dečanski (r. 1321–31) as tepčija. The Serbian court hierarchy at that time was as follows: stavilac, čelnik, kaznac, tepčija and vojvoda, the supreme title.

== Sources ==
- Blagojević, Miloš (2001). Državna uprava u srpskim srednjovekovnim zemljama (in Serbian). Službeni list SRJ. ISBN 9788635504971.
- Đorđević, Ivan M.; Vojvodić, Dragan; Marković, Miodrag (2008). Studije srpske srednjovekovne umetnosti (in Serbian). Zavod za Udžbenike. ISBN 9788617147400.
- SANU (1908). Glas (in Serbian). Vol. 78–80. SANU.

Court offices
Preceded by Kuzma	tepčija of Stefan Milutin some time between 1306 and 1321	Succeeded by Vladoje as tepčija of Stefan Dečanski
