= Travunia =

Historical state

Coordinates: 42.7172547°N 18.3694839°E

Principality of Travunia Травунија Travunija
- 9th century–11th century
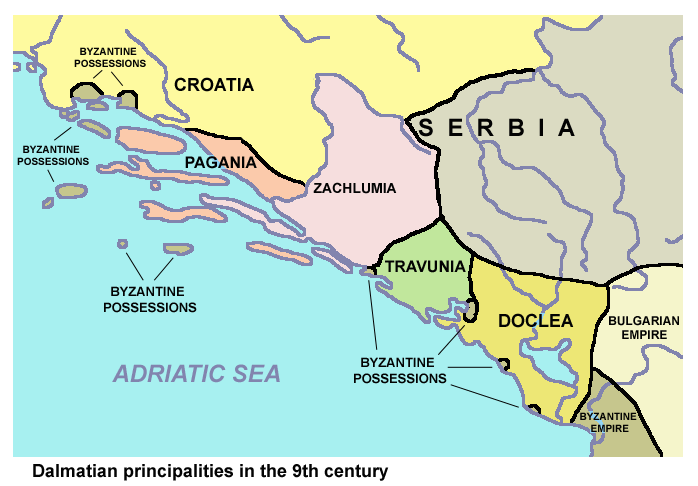
- Travunia in 9th century
- Religion: Christianity
- Government: Monarchy
- Prince
  - before 839: Beloje (first known)
  - c. 1054: Domanek (last independent)
- History
  - Established: 9th century
  - Conquered by Duklja: 11th century
Preceded by	Succeeded by
Principality of Serbia	Duklja
- Today part of: Croatia; Bosnia and Herzegovina; Montenegro

Travunia (Serbo-Croatian: Travunija / Травунија; Greek: Τερβουνία, romanized: Tervounía; Ancient Greek: Τερβουνία, romanized: Terbounía; Latin: Tribunia) was a South Slavic medieval principality that was part of Medieval Serbia (850–1371), and later the Medieval Bosnia (1373–1482). The principality became hereditary in a number of noble houses, often kin to the ruling dynasty. The region came under Ottoman rule in 1482. Its seat was in the city of Trebinje.

In the 9th and 10th centuries, the Župa of Travunia was held by the Belojević noble family, who were entitled the rule during the reign of Prince Vlastimir (r. 830–850), of the Vlastimirović dynasty. After the death of Časlav, the last dynastic member, the principality disintegrated, and the provinces were annexed by the Bulgars and Byzantines. In 1034, Stefan Vojislav (the founder of the Vojislavljević dynasty) incited a rebellion and renounced Byzantine rule, becoming the Prince of Serbs, ruling from the seat at Duklja. In the early 12th century, Desa of the Vukanović dynasty wrestled the region, and it continued under the rule of the Nemanjić dynasty (1166–1371), either held by dynastic members or close associates (most often military commanders), of which was the notable Vojinović noble family. After Nikola Altomanović, the holder of a large province during the fall of the Serbian Empire, was defeated in 1373, his estates were divided between Prince Lazar Hrebeljanović of Serbia, Đurađ I Balšić of Zeta, and Ban Tvrtko I Kotromanić of Bosnia. Trebinje continued under the Bosnian crown in the hands of the Pavlović family, and from 1435 under the Kosača family. It was finally annexed in 1481 by the Ottomans and organized into the Sanjak of Herzegovina.

== History ==
=== Early Middle Ages ===
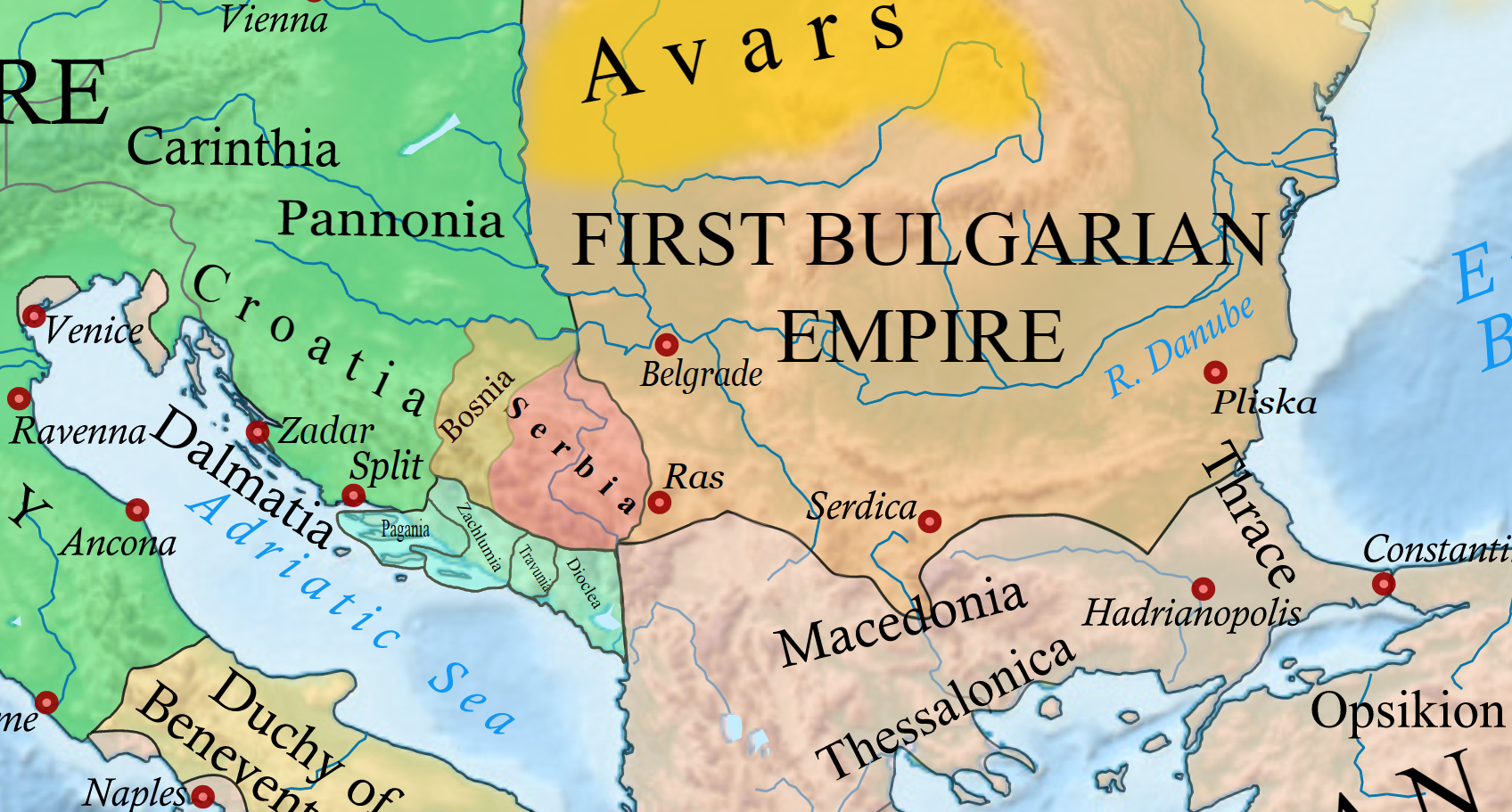
Slavic principalities in ca. 814 AD.

Tribulium was the original name for this settlement and the etymology of it may be analyzed as tri-bulium, or the place of the 'three hills', from the numeral 'three' (*trei-) and an appellative derived from the IE root *b(h)eu- 'to swell, puff'.

The Slavs invaded the Balkans during the reign of Justinian I (r. 527–565), when eventually up to 100,000 Slavs raided Thessalonica. The Western Balkans was settled with Sclaveni (Sklavenoi), the east with Antes. The Sklavenoi plundered Thrace in 545, and again the next year. In 551, the Slavs crossed Niš initially headed for Thessalonica, but ended up in Dalmatia. In 577 some 100,000 Slavs poured into Thrace and Illyricum, pillaging cities and then settling down. Charlemagne, King of the Franks from 768 until his death in 814, expanded the Frankish kingdom into an empire that incorporated much of western and central Europe. Dalmatia which was southeast of the Frankish empire, was in the hands of the Croats and Serbs. Radoslav of Serbia or his son was the ruler of Serbia during the uprisings (819–822) of Ljudevit Posavski against the Franks. According to the Royal Frankish Annals, in 822, Ljudevit went from his seat in Sisak to the Serbs who controlled a great part of Dalmatia ("ad Sorabos, quae natio magnam Dalmatiae partem obtinere dicitur") but according to John (Jr.) Fine, it was hard to find Serbs in this area since the Byzantine sources were limited to the southern coast, also it is possible that among other tribes exists tribe of group of small tribes of Serbs. The mentioning of "Dalmatia" in 822 and 833 as an old geographical term by the authors of Frankish Annals was Pars pro toto with a vague perception of what this geographical term actually referred to. In late 870s, the Theme of Dalmatia ("thema Dalmatias") was established, with the strategos seated at Dubrovnik (Ragusa, Ragusion). These small cities in the region (also Dyrrachium) did not stretch into the hinterlands, and had no military capacity, thus Basil I paid a tax of '72 gold coins' to the princes of Zahumlje and Travunia.

"From the city of Decatera begins the domain of Terbounia and stretches along as far as Ragusa, and on the side of its mountain country it is neighbour to Serbia." "Travunia (Terbounia) and Konavli are united. Its inhabitants originate from the unbaptized Serbs, who lived there since the archont that fled from White Serbia to Emperor Heraclius until the time of Vlastimer archon of Serbia." "The archonts of Travunia have always been subject to the archont of Serbia" "Populated cities in Travunia and Konavli are: Travunia (η Τερβουνια), Vrm (το Ορμος), Risan (τα Ρισενα), Lukavete (το Λουκαβεται), Zetlivi (του Ζετλεβε)."	– taken from De Administrando Imperio, by Constantine VII (905–959)

Trebinje is first attested in DAI by Constantine VII (905–959), when describing the migration and geography of the Serbs in 7th century, but the population's 7th Century identity remains a matter of dispute as it rather indicates Serbian political and ethnic connection during the time of Časlav in 10th Century. Travunia (Τερβουνια) was a province subservient to Serbian Principality under the Vlastimirović Dynasty. The first known office holder was Beloje, a count, who ruled under Prince Vlastimir (also possibly under Radoslav or Prosigoj, fl. 819). In the mid 9th century, Vlastimir marries his daughter to Krajina, the son of Beloje, and gives him the Župa of Trebinje to govern under his suzerainty. The Belojević noble family is entitled the rule of Travunia; Hvalimir, and his son Čučimir continue the office under the Serbian crown.

From 927 to 960, Časlav Klonimirović, the last of the Vlastimirović dynasty, held supreme rule of Travunia which at the time bordered Zahumlje to the west, the city of Ragusa or Dubrovnik to the southwest, Duklja to the south and Serbia (crownland, see Rascia) to the north. Its coastline spanned from Dubrovnik to Boka Kotorska. With the death of Časlav, Serbia disintegrated and Duklja absorbed most of Rascia along with Zahumlje and Trebinje. The Catepanate of Ras was established during the rule of John Tzimiskes (r. 969–976). A seal of a strategos of Ras has been dated to Tzimiskes' reign, making it possible for Tzimiskes' predecessor Nikephoros II Phokas to have enjoyed recognition in Rascia.

In the 990s, Bulgarian Tsar Samuel made client states out of most of the Balkans, including Duklja and Zahumlje. In 998, Samuel launched a major campaign against Jovan Vladimir to prevent a Byzantine-Serbian alliance. When his troops reached Duklja, Vladimir withdrew to the mountains, Samuel left part of the army at the foot of the mountains and led the remaining soldiers to besiege the coastal fortress of Ulcinj. In an effort to prevent bloodshed, he asked Jovan Vladimir to surrender, but Jovan refused, some Serb nobles offered their services to the Bulgarians and, when it became clear that further resistance was fruitless, the Serbs surrendered. Jovan Vladimir was exiled to Samuel's palaces in Prespa. The Bulgarian troops proceeded to pass through Dalmatia, taking control of Kotor and journeying to Dubrovnik. Although they failed to take Dubrovnik, they devastated the surrounding villages. The Bulgarian army then attacked Croatia in support of the rebel princes Krešimir III and Gojslav and advanced northwest as far as Split, Trogir and Zadar, then northeast through Bosnia and Raška and returned to Bulgaria.

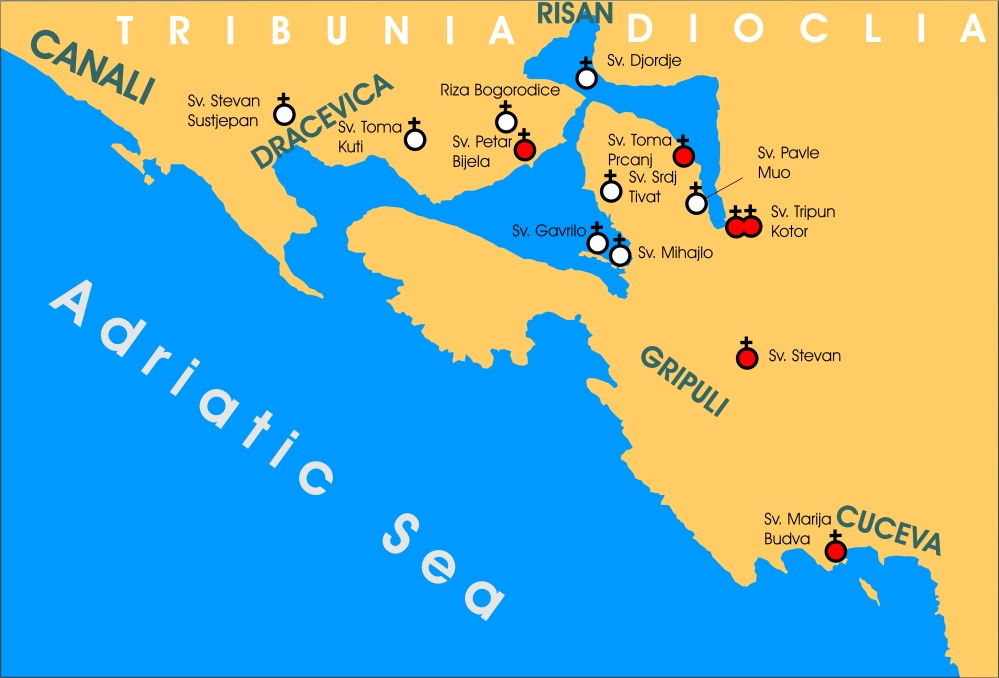
Border area of Duklja and Travunija in the Bay of Kotor and churches from the 9th (red) and 10th–11th centuries (white)

The dawn of the 10th century brought a short-lived Bulgarian occupation after the fall of the Rascian lands, but prince Caslav restored a Principality of Serbia by 931 and ruled Travunia as well. Travunia flourished under the greatest Serbian early medieval ruler – Saint Jovan Vladimir of Duklja and Travunia in the late 10th and early 11th century. With the trickery of Jovan Vladimir in 1016, Byzantine domination was restored under old Prince Dragomir. Dragomir was assassinated in Kotor in 1018 which brought upon Byzantine military occupation. Stefan Vojislav raised a rebellion in the 1030s. Prince of Zachlumia Ljutovid exerted his influence over Travunia, even though Stefan Vojislav claimed it. After inflicting a sound defeat to the Byzantines at Bar, Vojislav dispatched 50 captured Greeks to demoralize Liudevit's army that was awaiting at Klobuk. Vojislav's son Gojislav led the Dioclean forces and easily defeated Liutovid's forces, killing Liutovid himself with the help of two bodyguards. Travunia was fully incorporated into Doclea. When Gojslav became the ruler, he elected Trebinje as the new Serbian capital. He was assassinated by Travunian Prince Ljutovid who raised a rebellion in 1047–1050 and Mihailo I Vojislavljević had to depose Domanec, Liutovid's son, and move the capital from Travunia, placing his brother Saganek as Prince of Travunia. Saganek was overthrown in 1055, and it took Radoslav, Mihailo's faithful brother to finally kill Domanec and seize control over Travunia. In 1077 a Slavic Kingdom of Doclea and Dalmatia was proclaimed. It commanded the road from Ragusa to Constantinople, traversed, in 1096, by Raymond of Toulouse and his crusaders. With the coming of the 12th century, Travunia was fully incorporated into the unified Serbian state. Later, the Nemanjić dynasty took over since 1166/68. In 1217, the Serbian Kingdom was proclaimed.

With the death of Stefan Vojislav, the rule was divided between the five sons. Gojislav had received Travunia (Trebinje), and briefly ruled until he was killed by local nobles, who set up Domanek as Prince. Mihailo pursued and attacked Domanek, who fled, in his place Saganek was put to govern Travunia. Domanek then returned, and drove out Saganek. Mihailo offered the office to Radoslav, who declined, afraid of losing Luška župa (future Zeta). Radoslav perhaps distrusted his brother, thinking he would seize Zeta, but Mihailo seems to have offered him a deal. The Byzantine Empire, wanting to take advantage of the death of Stefan Vojislav, prepared an offensive against unstable Duklja. At this time, the four remaining brothers made peace and made an alliance. The treaty concluded is the oldest in Serbian history. After the agreement, Radoslav attacked Trebinje, killing Domanek. After this event, their mother (who had acted as an stability in the relations between the brothers) died. While in no imminent danger from that side, Mihailo found it favorable to further strengthen ties with Byzantium around 1052, gaining the title of protospatharios, also marrying a niece of Constantine IX Monomachos. This might have implied titular recognition of Constantinople's authority, but no real concessions on his part. It corresponded to the then-current balance of forces, and bought some 20 years of peace and prosperity to his land.

=== Late Middle Ages ===
Trebinje became a part of the expanded Medieval Bosnian state under Tvrtko I in 1373. There is a medieval tower in Gornje Police whose construction is often attributed to Vuk Branković. The old Tvrdoš Monastery dates back to the 15th century.

Travunia got a neighbour by 1326, as the Bosnians conquered Zachlumia. In 1345, the Serbian Empire was created. After the collapse of the Serbian Empire in 1371, the area of Trebinje became ruled by the House of Vojinović Serbian dynasty from Hum. With Nikola Altomanović's defeat, the Bosnian King Tvrtko took the area in 1377 and it has been a component of Herzegovina ever since.

== List of Rulers ==
This lists only the rulers who had Travunia as their appanage or fief and will not house the rulers of the region of Travunia. Travunia was merged into neighbouring states and lost its importance several times in history (amalgamation).

- Beloje (before 839), župan of Travunija
- Krajina Belojević (fl. 847/848), župan of Travunija, son of Beloje and son-in-law of Vlastimir
- Hvalimir (late 9th century), župan of Travunija, son of Krajina
- Čučimir (first half of 10th century), župan of Travunija, son of Hvalimir
- Dragimir (before 1000–1018), Prince of Travunija and Zachlumia
- Domanek (fl. 1054), Prince of Travunija
- Desa (1149–1162), Prince of Duklja, Travunija and Zahumlje
- Grdeša (fl. 1150–51), župan of Travunija

== See also ==
- Kanalites
- Pagania
- Zachumlia
- Duklja

== Sources ==
Primary sources

- Moravcsik, Gyula, ed. (1967) [1949]. Constantine Porphyrogenitus: De Administrando Imperio (2nd revised ed.). Washington D.C.: Dumbarton Oaks Center for Byzantine Studies. ISBN 9780884020219.
- Pertz, Georg Heinrich, ed. (1845). Einhardi Annales. Hanover.
- Scholz, Bernhard Walter, ed. (1970). Carolingian Chronicles: Royal Frankish Annals and Nithard's Histories. University of Michigan Press. ISBN 0472061860.
- Шишић, Фердо, ed. (1928). Летопис Попа Дукљанина (Chronicle of the Priest of Duklja). Београд-Загреб: Српска краљевска академија.
- Кунчер, Драгана (2009). Gesta Regum Sclavorum. Vol. 1. Београд-Никшић: Историјски институт, Манастир Острог.
- Живковић, Тибор (2009). Gesta Regum Sclavorum. Vol. 2. Београд-Никшић: Историјски институт, Манастир Острог.

Secondary sources

- Ćirković, Sima (2004). The Serbs. Malden: Blackwell Publishing. ISBN 9781405142915.
- Curta, Florin (2006). Southeastern Europe in the Middle Ages, 500–1250. Cambridge: Cambridge University Press. ISBN 9780521815390.
- Dvornik, F.; Jenkins, R. J. H.; Lewis, B.; Moravcsik, Gy.; Obolensky, D.; Runciman, S. (1962). P. J. H. Jenkins (ed.). De Administrando Imperio: Volume II. Commentary. University of London: The Athlone Press.
- Fine, John V. A. Jr. (1991) [1983]. The Early Medieval Balkans: A Critical Survey from the Sixth to the Late Twelfth Century. Ann Arbor: University of Michigan Press. ISBN 0-472-08149-7.
- Fine, John V. A. (1994) [1987]. The Late Medieval Balkans: A Critical Survey from the Late Twelfth Century to the Ottoman Conquest. Ann Arbor, Michigan: University of Michigan Press. ISBN 978-0-472-10079-8.
- Stoianovich, Traian (1994). Balkan worlds: the first and last Europe. M.E. Sharpe. ISBN 9781563240331.
- Ćorović, Vladimir, Istorija srpskog naroda, Book I, (In Serbian) Electric Book, Rastko
- Ross, James Bruce (April 1945). "Two Neglected Paladins of Charlemagne: Erich of Friuli and Gerold of Bavaria". Speculum. 20 (2). Cambridge, Massachusetts: Medieval Academy of America: 212–235. doi:10.2307/2854596. ISSN 0038-7134. JSTOR 2854596. S2CID 163300685.
- Runciman, Steven (1988). The Emperor Romanus Lecapenus and His Reign: A Study of Tenth-Century Byzantium. Cambridge University Press. ISBN 9780521357227.
- Vlasto, A. P. (1970). The Entry of the Slavs into Christendom: An Introduction to the Medieval History of the Slavs. Cambridge: Cambridge University Press. ISBN 9780521074599.
- Zlatar, Zdenko (2007). The poetics of Slavdom: the mythopoeic foundations of Yugoslavia. Peter Lang. ISBN 9780820481357.
- Živković, Tibor (2008). Forging unity: The South Slavs between East and West 550-1150. Belgrade: The Institute of History, Čigoja štampa. ISBN 9788675585732.
- The early history of the Slavonic settlements in Dalmatia, Croatia, & Serbia (1920)
