= Treskavec Monastery =

Macedonian Orthodox monastery on Mount Zlatovrv, North Macedonia

Coordinates: 41°24′14.46″N 21°32′17.74″E

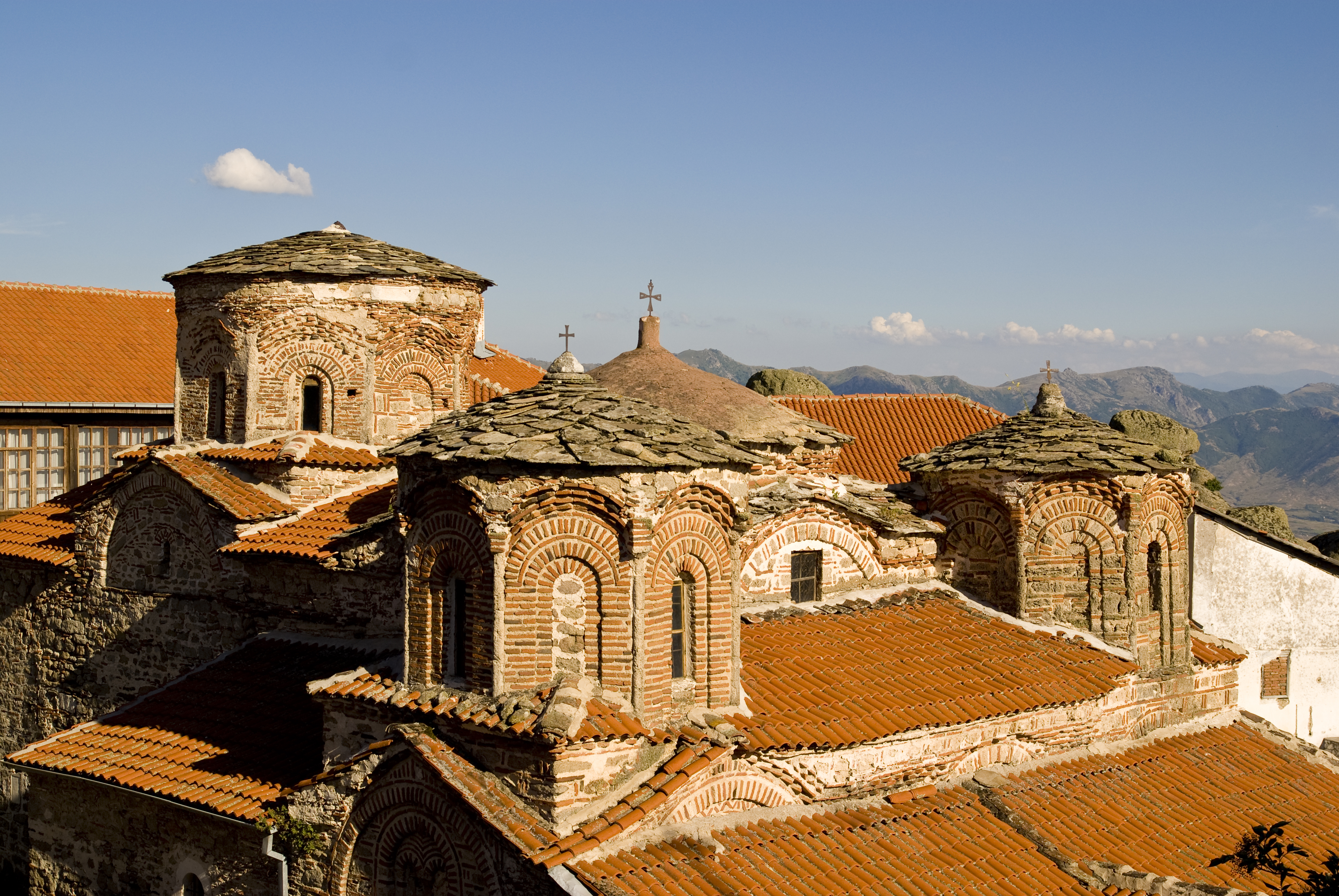
- Treskavec Monastery
- Interactive map of Treskavec Monastery

Monastery information
- Order: Macedonian Orthodox
- Established: 12th century

Site
- Public access: Yes

The Monastery of Treskavec (Macedonian: Манастир Трескавец), or St. Bogorodica, is a monastery situated on the rocky Mount Zlatovrv, 8km north of Prilep, in North Macedonia. Built in the 12th century, it currently has only one monk.

== Background ==
The monastery possesses a large collection of Byzantine frescoes. The oldest remaining date from the 15th century, including the first known representation of the heavenly court.

It was rebuilt in the 14th century by Serbian kings Stefan Milutin and Stefan Dušan. In the 15th century the monastery was hit by an earthquake, damaging many of the frescoes. In the mid-16th century it was renovated by knez Dimitrije Pepić (d. 1566) of Kratovo. The monastery has been in use since the Middle Ages and at its peak had around 100 monks. Frescoes showing the nobleman Gradislav Borilović suggest he may have been buried at the monastery, due to his donations to the church.

The monastery was largely destroyed by a fire in 2013, although the church remained untouched. It was also damaged in fires in 1991 and 1867.

The monastery is located in a remote area, with a steep 8km hike necessary to reach it from the nearest town of Prilep. It is at an altitude of 1260m. The Macedonian government meanwhile realized a road to allow better access to the monastery.

== Gallery ==
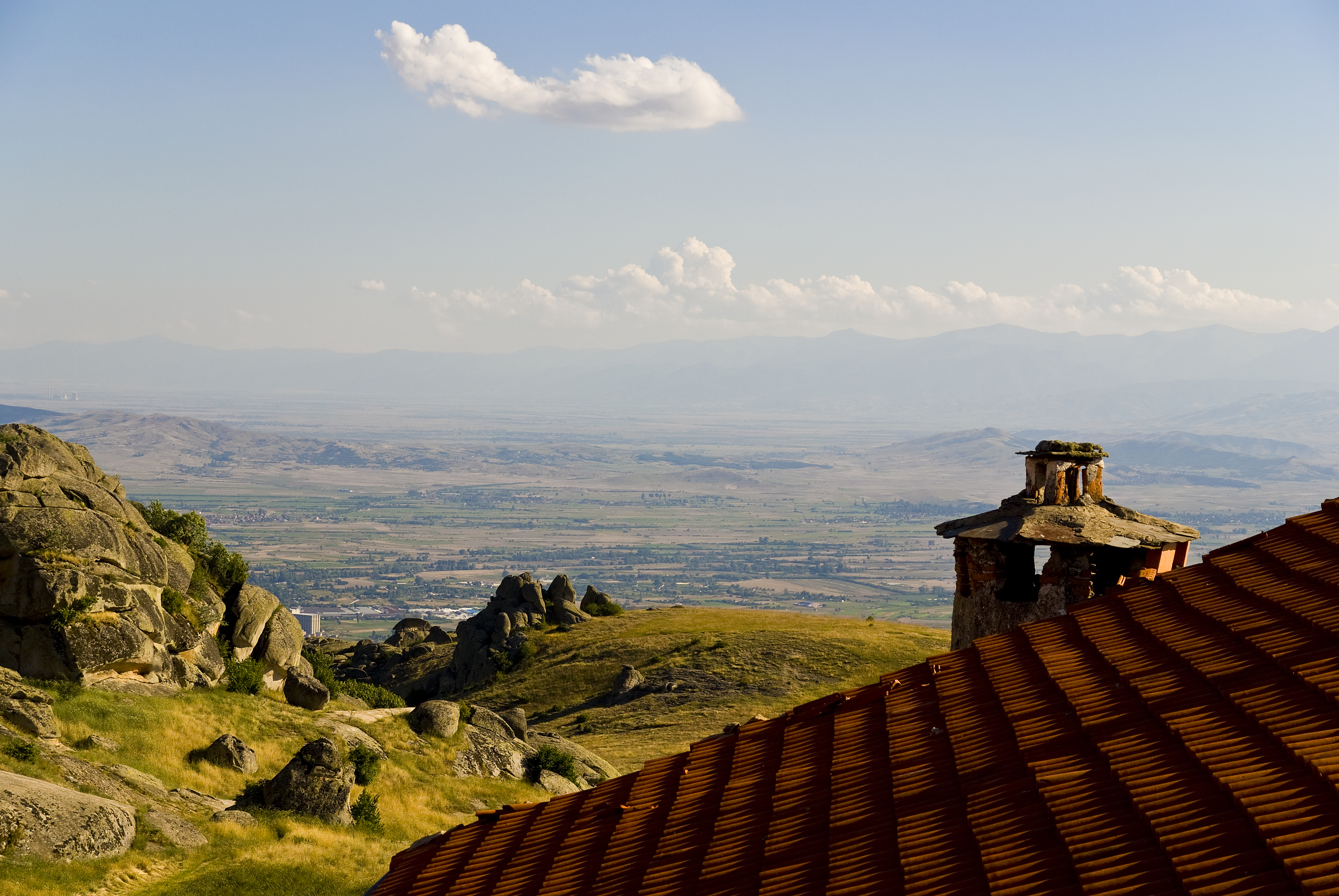
View from the top of Treskavec

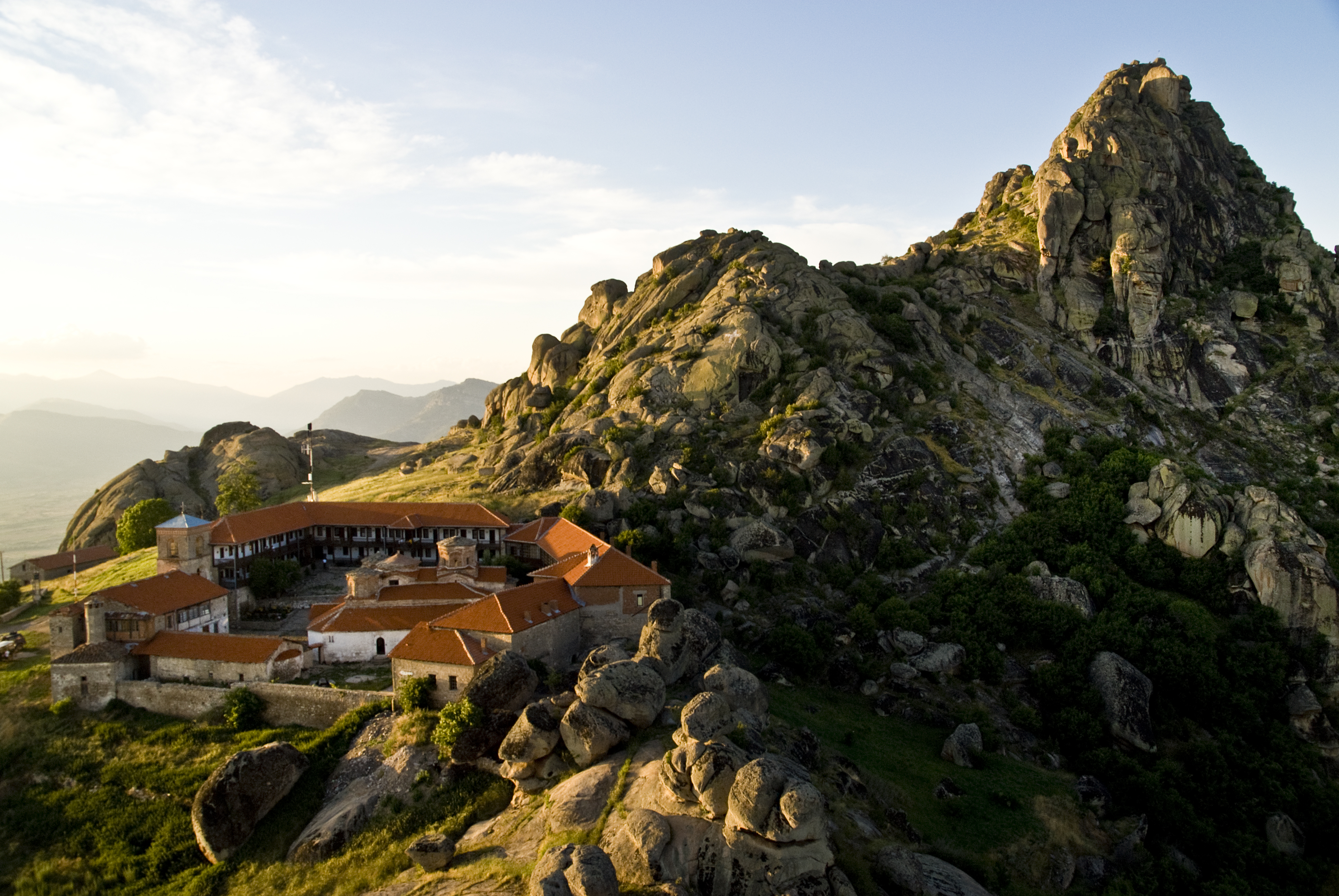
Treskavec and surroundings

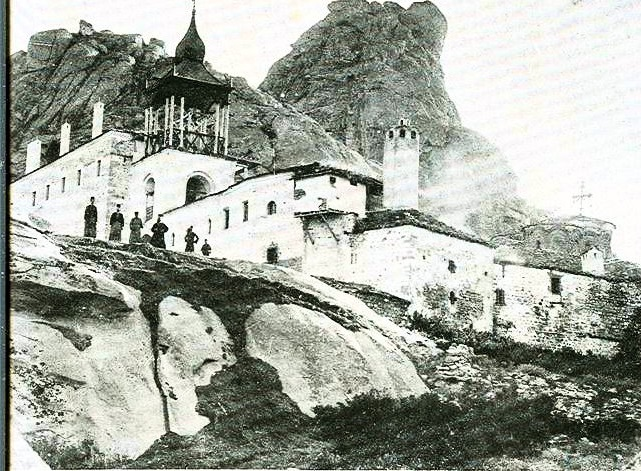
Treskavec Monastery in the early 1900s

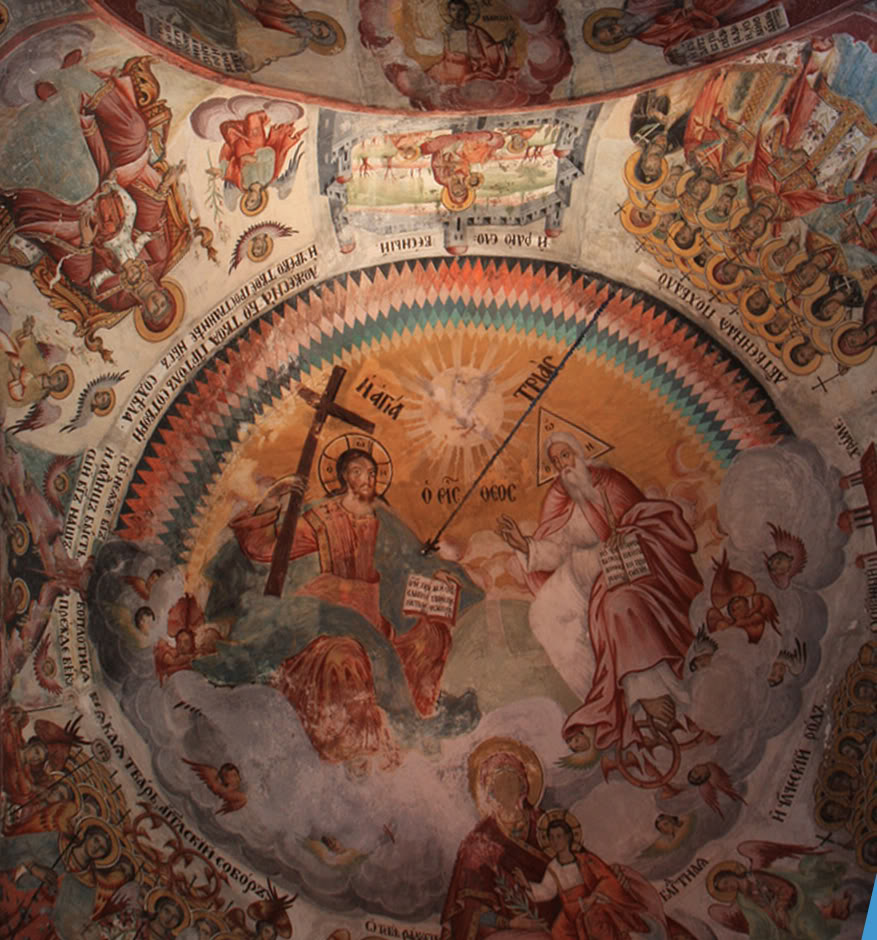
Dome inside the church

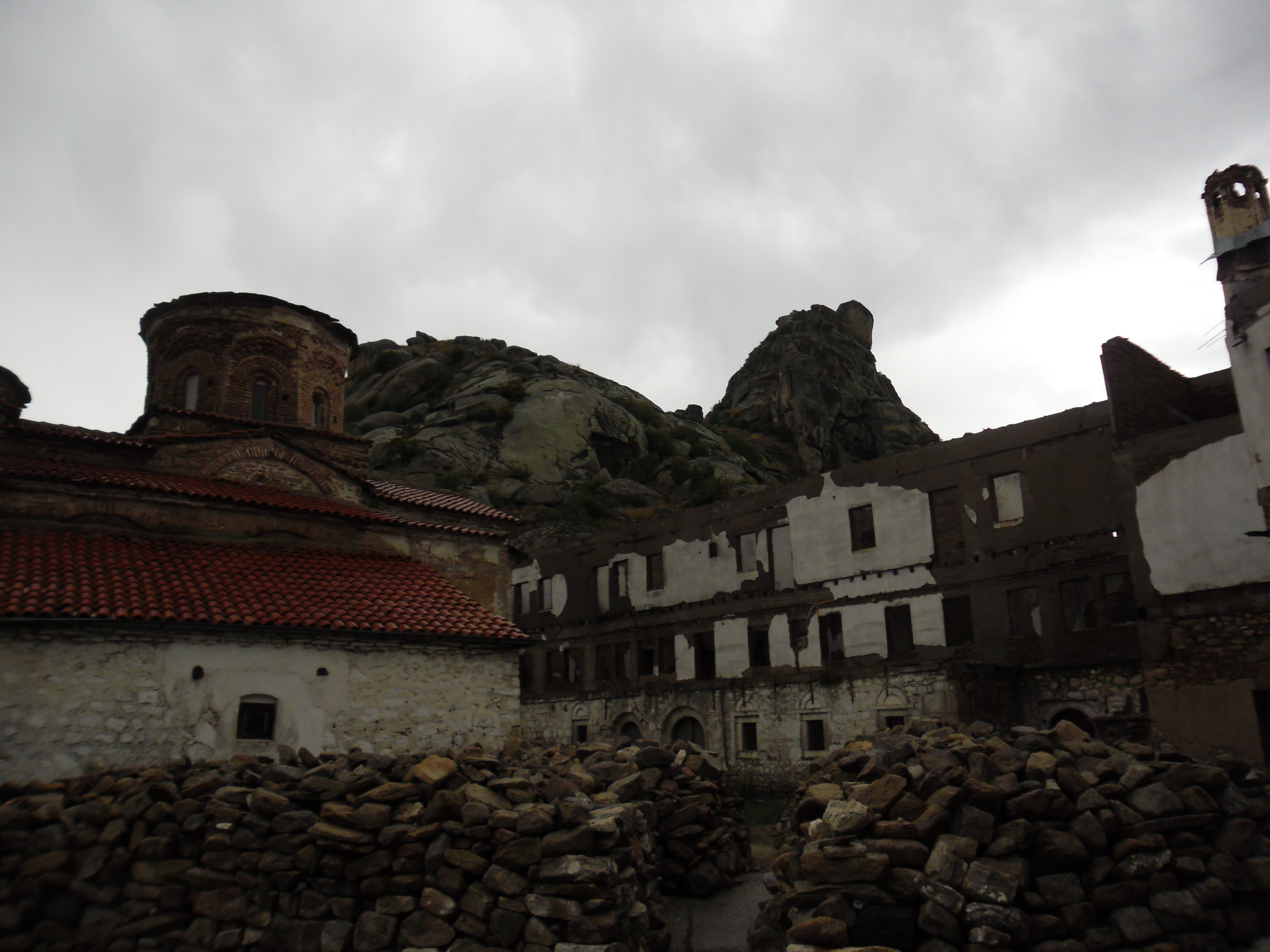
Treskavec Monastery as of August 2015
