= Slavogost =

Slavogost (Latin: Slavogostus) is a Slavic name that was in use in Croatia and Serbia in the Middle Ages. It may refer to:

- Slavogost (fl. 1198), župan of Korbava (comes corbaviensis)
- Slavogost (fl. 1382–died before 1398), notarius from Sebenico (Šibenik).
- Slavogost or Slavogast, fictitious ban of Zahumlje, allegedly mentioned in a Ragusan document dating to December 1, 1151, regarding the gifting of the Church of St. Pancratius on Babino Polje to the Benedictine monastery on Lokrum. At that time, Zahumlje was ruled by Serbian Grand Prince Desa.
