= Kuzma (tepčija) =

Kuzma (Serbian Cyrillic: Кузма; fl. 1306) was a Serbian nobleman that served king Stefan Milutin (r. 1282–1321), with the title of tepčija. The Serbian court hierarchy at that time was as follows: stavilac, čelnik, kaznac, tepčija and vojvoda, the supreme title. He was given the governorship of Vranje (a župa, "county", including the town and neighbouring villages) some time before 1306. He was a contemporary of kaznac Miroslav, who held the surroundings of Vranje.

== Sources ==
- Blagojević, Miloš (2001). Državna uprava u srpskim srednjovekovnim zemljama (in Serbian). Službeni list SRJ. ISBN 9788635504971.

Court offices
Vacant Title last held by Obrad as veliki tepčija of Stefan Vladislav	tepčija of Stefan Milutin fl. 1306	Succeeded by Hardomil
Other offices
Preceded by ?	Governor of Vranje fl. 1306	Succeeded by Baldovin
