= Sebri =

Commoners in medieval Serbia

The sebri (Serbian Cyrillic: себри) was the lower-half social class, commoners, of the medieval Serbian state. The status of the groups comprising the class was regulated in medieval code of laws, such as Dušan's Code (1349). It included several groups, mainly divided into:

- The meropsi (меропси) or merophe (меропхе), dependent farmers. Other terms included zemljanin ("earthen [man]", from zemlja, "land"), Srbljin (from the Serb ethnonym), or zemljani ljudi ("earthen folk"). They served either the ruler, the church, or nobility. Medieval sources allows for understanding the legal position of the church's meropsi, while that of the ruler's and nobility's meropsi is deemed insufficient. The fact that there were three groups implies that their status was not identical, however, it has been established that their status did essentially not differ.
- The vlasi (власи) or pastiri (пастири), dependent shepherds. The multitude and likely prevalence of Vlachs (Romanized remnants; see Vlachs in medieval Serbia) among the shepherds made the term "Vlachs" a synonym for shepherds, similarly as the term Srbljin was sporadically used for farmers. The status of the vlasi was basically equal to the meropsi.
- The otroci (отроци), a type of medieval slaves. This group was closest to having complete deprivation of rights, similar to slaves (robovi), although this has for long and persistently been disputed in scholarship. The lord could free his otroci from that status, which points to similarity with slave status.
- The dependent (or rural) craftsmen and sokalnici (сокалници). The craftsmen and sokalnici had a special status, which is unclarified from available sources.
- Partially also the rural clergy.

== See also ==
- Serbian nobility in the Middle Ages

== Sources ==
- Blagojević, Miloš (2001). Državna uprava u srpskim srednjovekovnim zemljama (in Serbian). Službeni list SRJ. ISBN 9788635504971.
- Blagojević, Miloš (2004). Nemanjići i Lazarevići i srpska srednjovekovna državnost (in Serbian). Zavod za udžbenike i nastavna sredstva. ISBN 9788617121882.
- Ćirković, Sima; Mihaljčić, Rade (1999). Лексикон српског средњег века (in Serbian). Knowledge. ISBN 9788683233014.
- Dinić, Mihailo; Ćirković, Sima (1978). Српске земље у средњем веку: историјско-географске студије (in Serbian). Српска књижевна задруга.
- Janković, Dragoslav (1961). Istorija države i prava feudalne Srbije, XII-XV vek (in Serbian). Naućna knjiga.
- Jevtić, Dragoš; Popović, Dragoljub (2000). Narodna pravna istorija (in Serbian). Savremena administracija. ISBN 9788638706181.
- Mandić, Svetislav (1986). Velika gospoda sve srpske zemlje i drugi prosopografski prilozi (in Serbian). Srpska književna zadruga. ISBN 9788637900122.
- Purković, Miodrag (1985). Srpska kultura srednjega veka (in Serbian). Izd. Srpske pravoslavne eparhije za zapadnu Evropu.
- Šarkić, Srđan (1996). Srednjovekovno srpsko pravo (in Serbian). Matica srpska. ISBN 9788636303696.
