= Obrad (veliki tepčija) =

Obrad (Serbian Cyrillic: Обрад) was a Serbian nobleman who served king Stefan Vladislav (r. 1234–43), with the title of veliki tepčija. He is the oldest veliki tepčija known by name. The title-holder took care of the royal estates. He is mentioned in the 1230s, as a "great lord" (veliki gospodin). He had a menologion written, which later came into the possession of Radoslava ("the wife of the tepčija", presumably veliki tepčija Mišljen). The work includes songs to St. Sava. He seems to have not belonged to the royal family.

== Sources ==
- Blagojević, Miloš (2001). Državna uprava u srpskim srednjovekovnim zemljama (in Serbian). Službeni list SRJ. ISBN 9788635504971.
- Ćirković, Sima; Mihaljčić, Rade (1999). Лексикон српског средњег века (in Serbian). Knowledge. ISBN 9788683233014.
- Mandić, Svetislav (1986). Velika gospoda sve srpske zemlje i drugi prosopografski prilozi (in Serbian). Srpska književna zadruga. ISBN 9788637900122.

Court offices
First	veliki tepčija of Stefan Vladislav fl. 1230s	Vacant Title next held by Kuzma as tepčija of Stefan Milutin
