= Ivaniš (magnate) =

- despot (деспот) of the Serbian Empire

Serbian imperial magnate
- Reign: despot (fl. 1348)
- Born: Serbian Kingdom
- Died: After 1348; Serbian Empire
- Noble family: Ivanišević
- Issue: Altoman

Ivaniš (Serbian Cyrillic: Иваниш, fl. 1348) was a Serbian magnate (velikaš) who served Emperor Stefan Dušan (r. 1331–55) as despot. He is mentioned in Emperor Dušan's charter of the Monastery of the Holy Archangels near Prizren, dated 1348, in which he calls Ivaniš a "parent of my Empire". Not much is known about him, though his high dignitary title and the fact that Dušan called him "his parent" shows that he was a close relative with the royal family. Ivaniš had possessions in the Toplica region and granted one of his villages to the Monastery. Ivaniš and then his son, Altoman, held a province in Toplica, evidently near the core of the future province of Lazar Hrebeljanović.

His son Altoman married a sister of Lazar Hrebeljanović and had a son, Ivaniš, who died between 1372 and 1389, and was buried at Visoki Dečani. Some historians earlier believed that Ivaniš was related to Lazar's wife, Milica Nemanjić. Some did also try to connect him to monk Dorotej of Hilandar, who is known to have held the despot title prior to his monastic vows, and was the ktetor of the Drenča Monastery in Rasina, although his secular name is not preserved.

== Family tree ==
- Ivaniš (d. after 1348)
  - Altoman
    - Ivaniš (d. 1372–89)

Court offices
New creation	despot of Stefan Dušan fl. 1348; Served alongside: Simeon Uroš; Jovan Asen	Succeeded by Vukašin as serving Uroš V
