= Mišljen (veliki tepčija) =

Serbian nobleman

Mišljen (Serbian Cyrillic: Мишљен; fl. ca. 1330) was a Serbian nobleman that served king Stefan Dečanski (r. 1321–31), with the title of veliki tepčija. The title-holder took care of the royal estates. He was wealthy. In 1330 he had a monastery dedicated to the Holy Apostles built somewhere in eastern Hum. He restored the church, donated books, vestments and gold, and built himself an adorned tomb. This church is located in the village of Crkvina, 6 km from Goražde (in Bosnia and Herzegovina). The menologion written on demand of veliki tepčija Obrad (fl. 1230s) is recorded to have later came into the possession of Radoslava, "the wife of the tepčija", presumably of Mišljen.

== Sources ==
- Blagojević, Miloš (2001). Državna uprava u srpskim srednjovekovnim zemljama (in Serbian). Službeni list SRJ. pp. 25–26. ISBN 9788635504971.
- Ćirković, Sima; Mihaljčić, Rade (1999). Лексикон српског средњег века (in Serbian). Knowledge. ISBN 9788683233014.
- Mandić, Svetislav (1986). Velika gospoda sve srpske zemlje i drugi prosopografski prilozi (in Serbian). Srpska književna zadruga. ISBN 9788637900122.
- Srejović, Dragoslav; Gavrilović, Slavko; Ćirković, Sima M. (1982). Istorija srpskog naroda: knj. Od najstarijih vremena do Maričke bitke (1371) (in Serbian). Srpska književna zadruga.

Court offices
Preceded by Vladoje as tepčija	veliki tepčija of Stefan Dečanski fl. 1330	Succeeded by Gradislav as tepčija of Stefan Dušan
