= Mladen Vladojević =

14th century Serbian noble

- Born: Late 13th century Kingdom of Serbia
- Died: after 1348; Unknown
- Occupation: nobleman, ktetor

Mladen Vladojević (Serbian Cyrillic: Младен Владојевић; fl. 1330–48) was a Serbian nobleman who served king and emperor Stefan Dušan (r. 1331–55).

== Biography ==
Together with his parents, he was the ktetor (founder, donator) of the Church of the Holy Saviour in Prizren (now in Kosovo), built in c. 1330, as mentioned in the Holy Archangels' Chrysobull (1348). Dušan decided that Mladen together with his mother and relatives, and not alone, were to mark the boundary of their family estate. The church was granted as a metochion (monastic dependency) to the Monastery of the Holy Archangels, the foundation of Stefan Dušan, while Mladen in turn was granted a church in Ohrid, along with its estates. It has been presumed by some historians (Đorđe Sp. Radojičić) that Mladen Vladojević was the same as magnate Mladen (fl. 1323–26). He was included in the novel Car Dušan (1919) by Vladan Đorđević.

== Sources ==
- Ivan M. Đorđević; Dragan Vojvodić; Miodrag Marković (2008). Studije srpske srednjovekovne umetnosti. Zavod za Udžbenike.
- Radomir Popović (1991). Crkvena imovina u Nemanjićkoj Srbiji. Izdaje Sveti arhijerejski sinod Srpske pravoslavne crkve.
