= Dabiživ Spandulj =

Serbian nobleman

- kefalija

Dabiživ Spandulj (Serbian: Дабижив Спандуљ) or Dabiživ Stanko (Дабижив Станко; fl. 1375–76) was a Serbian nobleman with the title of kefalija ("chief") that governed Strumica, serving the Dejanović brothers. He is mentioned in a document dating to 1375–76 regarding the clarification of the borders of some metochion of Hilandar in the Strumica field. He was mentioned alongside bishop Danilo of Strumica, bishop Grigorije of Banja, and čelnik Terijan.

== See also ==
- Dabiživ Čihorić (fl. 1345), nobleman serving Stefan Dušan in Trebinje
- Dabiživ Nenčić (fl. 1383–99), župan, son of Nenac and Radača, mentioned as a neighbour to the Ragusans
