= Vladoje (tepčija) =

Vladoje (Serbian Cyrillic: Владоје; fl. 1326) was a Serbian nobleman that served king Stefan Dečanski (r. 1321–31), with the title of tepčija. He was mentioned in 1326, but most likely began his office at the end of king Stefan Milutin's reign (1282–1321). He succeeded Hardomil, who had served Stefan Milutin as tepčija. King Stefan Dečanski's confirmation on the rights of Ragusan merchants dating to 25 March 1326 was attended by vojvoda Mladen, tepčija Vladoje, and čelnik Đuraš Ilijić. The Serbian court hierarchy was as follows: stavilac, čelnik, kaznac, tepčija and vojvoda, the supreme title. Vladoje marked the boundaries of Belaćevac as an arbitrator in 1326. He was included in the novel Car Dušan (1919) by Vladan Đorđević.

== Sources ==
- Blagojević, Miloš (2001). Državna uprava u srpskim srednjovekovnim zemljama (in Serbian). Službeni list SRJ. pp. 26–27, 46. ISBN 9788635504971.

Court offices
Preceded by Hardomil as tepčija of Stefan Milutin	tepčija of Stefan Dečanski fl. 1326	Succeeded by Mišljen as veliki tepčija
