= Borilovići =

Borilovići Бориловићи
- Village
- Location within Bosnia and Herzegovina
- Coordinates: 42°46′24″N 18°22′29″E
- Country: Bosnia and Herzegovina
- Entity: Republika Srpska
- Municipality: Trebinje
- Time zone: UTC+1 (CET)
  - Summer (DST): UTC+2 (CEST)

Borilovići (Serbian Cyrillic: Бориловићи) is a village in the municipality of Trebinje, Bosnia and Herzegovina.
