= Travunian dynasty =

The Belojević clan (Serbian Cyrillic: Белојевић), colloquially Travunian dynasty, was a local Slavic ruling clan from region surrounding Trebinje, a center of an early Slavic polity, Travunia. The clan was in vassal relations with the first Serbian Principality's ruling Vlastimirović's, but constantly strived for independence starting with the clan's progenitor Beloje, who sought to free himself of Serbian rule. Beloje was mentioned as the župan of Travunia in the chapter on the Serbs in De Administrando Imperio (DAI) of Byzantine Emperor Constantine VII (r. 945–959). Prince Vlastimir (r. 836–851) married his daughter to Beloje's son Krajina, and elevated him to the rank of archon, sometime prior the Bulgar–Serb War (839–842). Krajina's descendants were entitled to rule the region comprising the hinterland of Dubrovnik and Boka Kotorska, with seat at Trebinje, still under Serbian suzerainty. The clan is later mentioned in the semi-mythical Chronicle of the Priest of Duklja, which mentioned that a descendant of Hvalimir, Dragomir, ruled Travunia in the second half of the 10th century, his brother Petrislav ruling Duklja and his son Stefan Vojislav later ruling Duklja and founding the Vojislavljević dynasty.

== Members ==
- Beloje (before 839), lord of Trebinje
  - Krajina (fl. 847), married the daughter of Vlastimir in 847/848, becomes Župan of Travunia
    - Hvalimir (Serbian: Хвалимир, Greek: Φαλιμἑρης, Latin: Phalimer; late 9th century)
      - Čučimir (Greek: Τζουτζημέρης; first half of 10th century)
        - Dragomir, rules Travunia the second half of 10th century
          - Vojislav, lord of Trebinje the first half of 11th century, becomes prince of Duklja in 1018

== See also ==
- Vlastimirović dynasty, ruled Serbia 768–969
- Vojislavljević dynasty, ruled Serbia 1010–1091, Duklja 1010–1043; Pomorje 1043–1148
- Vukanović dynasty, ruled Serbia 1091–1163, Rascia 1060–1163, Pomorje 1148–1163
- Pomorje
