= Tepčija =

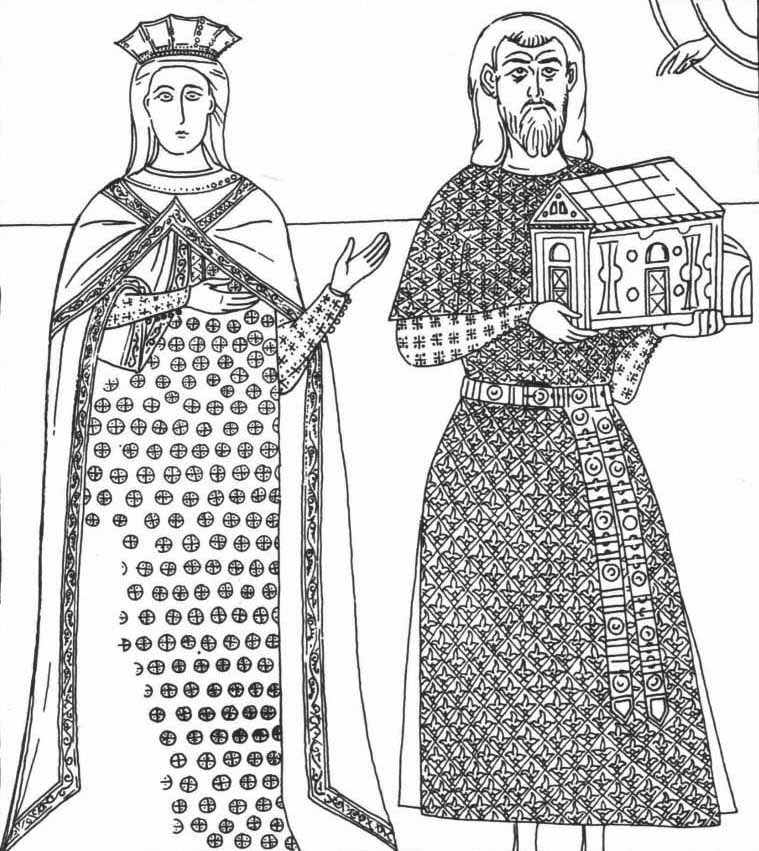
Tepčija Gradislav and his wife, Treskavac Monastery.

Tepčija (Serbian Cyrillic: тепчија) was a court title of Croatia, Serbia and Bosnia in the Middle Ages. The functions and position in the court is unclear. It was first mentioned in Croatia in the second half of the 11th century, and later in Serbia in the first half of the 13th century, and in Bosnia during 13th and 14th century. The title-holder took care of the country's feudal estates. There were two or three levels in title, the veliki tepčija (grand), "tepčija" and Mali tepčija (lower). "Veliki tepčija" took care of the royal estates. Tepčija had a similar office to that of the kaznac , and cared of all major feudal estates bar that which belonged to the Court. "Tepčija" had executive authorities. His servants were called otroci (sing. otrok).

The Serbian court hierarchy at the time of king Stefan Milutin (r. 1282–1321) was as follows: stavilac, čelnik, kaznac, tepčija and vojvoda, the supreme title. In the Dečani chrysobulls of king Stefan Dečanski (r. 1321–31), the court dignitaries present at the Dečani assembly were the kaznac, tepčija, vojvoda, sluga and stavilac.

== List ==
Croatia

- Ljubimir (fl. ~1089)

Serbia

- Obrad (fl. 1230s), veliki tepčija, served Stefan Vladislav.
- Dobravac (fl. 1280), served the countess of Hum.
- Kuzma (fl. 1306), served Stefan Milutin.
- Hardomil, served Stefan Milutin.
- Vladoje (fl. 1326), served Stefan Dečanski.
- Mišljen (fl. 1330), veliki tepčija, served Stefan Dečanski.
- Gradislav (fl. 1337–45), served Stefan Dušan.
- Stepko Čihorić (fl. 1340s), served Stefan Dušan.

Bosnia

- Radonja (fl. 1240), served Matej Ninoslav
- Vučin
- Rados(l)av (fl. 1326–29), served Dabiša.
- Milat (fl. 1359), served Tvrtko in Hum.
- Batalo (fl. 1391–1404), lord of the župa (county) of Lašva
- Sladoje

== Sources ==
- Blagojević, Miloš (2001). Državna uprava u srpskim srednjovekovnim zemljama (in Serbian). Službeni list SRJ. ISBN 9788635504971.
- Ćirković, Sima; Mihaljčić, Rade (1999). Лексикон српског средњег века (in Serbian). Knowledge. ISBN 9788683233014.
- Dinić, Mihailo; Ćirković, Sima (1978). Српске земље у средњем веку: историјско-географске студије (in Serbian). Српска књижевна задруга.
- Mandić, Svetislav (1986). Velika gospoda sve srpske zemlje i drugi prosopografski prilozi (in Serbian). Srpska književna zadruga. ISBN 9788637900122.
- Purković, Miodrag (1985). Srpska kultura srednjega veka (in Serbian). Izd. Srpske pravoslavne eparhije za zapadnu Evropu.
- Šarkić, Srđan (1996). Srednjovekovno srpsko pravo (in Serbian). Matica srpska. ISBN 9788636303696.
