= Kastrophylax =

Kastrophylax (Greek: καστροφύλαξ, "fortress guard" or "fortress warden") was a late Byzantine local official who served as the assistant of the kephale (provincial governor) in maintaining the defense of a fortified city (kastron) and its guard service.
