= List of monarchs of Montenegro =

Monarchy of Montenegro
- Royal Coat of arms

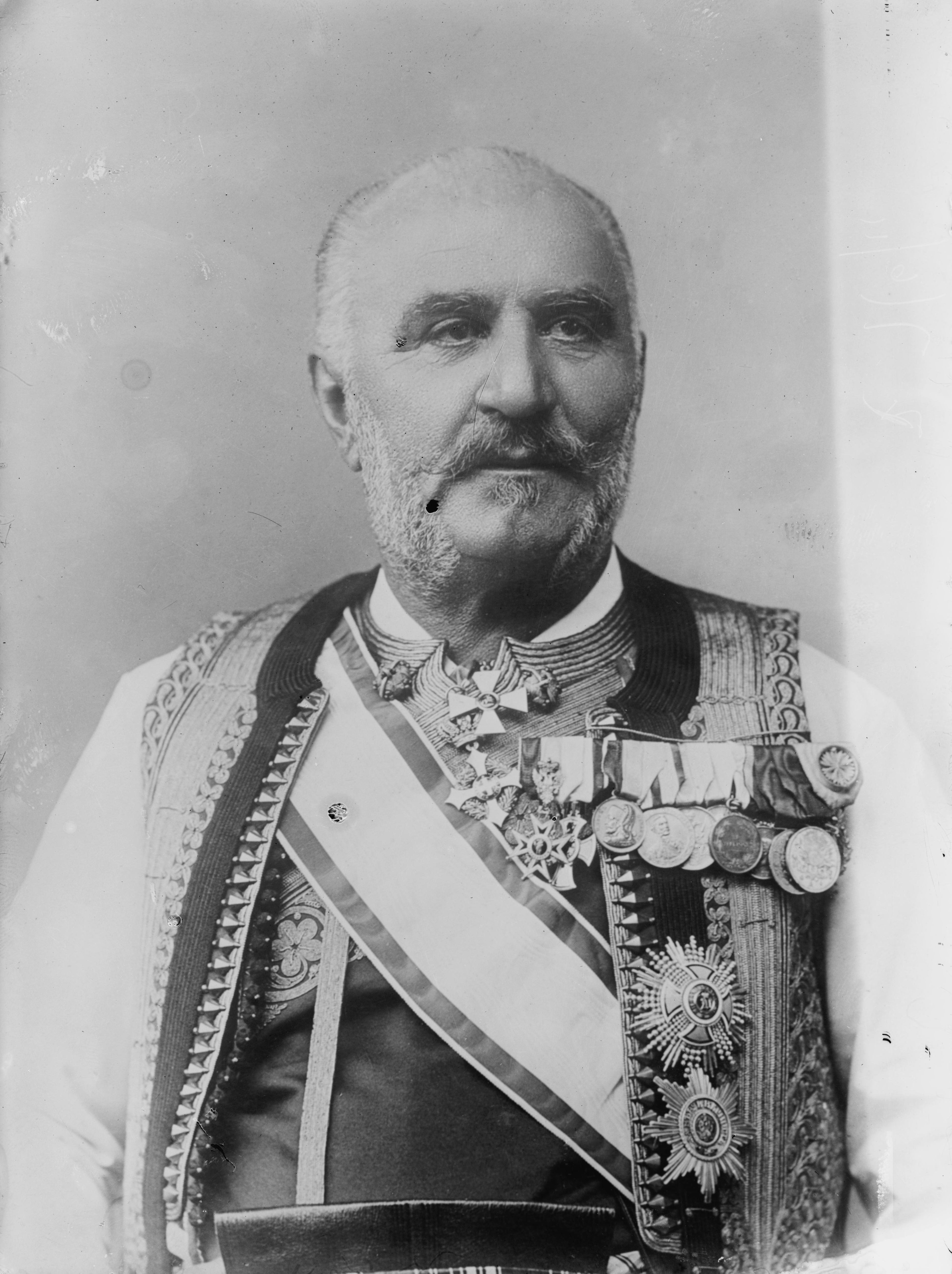
- Nikola I

Details
- Style: His Majesty
- First monarch: Vojislav (as Prince)
- Last monarch: Nikola I (as King)
- Formed: 1018; 1008 years ago
- Abolished: 1918; 108 years ago
- Residence: Cetinje Royal Palace
- Appointer: Hereditary
- Pretender: Nikola Petrović-Njegoš

This article lists monarchs of Montenegro, from the establishment of Duklja to the Kingdom of Montenegro which merged into the Kingdom of Serbia in 1918.

== Medieval Duklja (Dioclea) ==
=== Non-hereditary archons ===
- Petar or Petrislav (late 10th c.)
- Jovan Vladimir (1000 – May 22, 1016)

=== House of Vojislavljević ===
- Vojislav I (1018 – c. 1043)
- Neda (1043 – 1046)
- Mihailo I (c. 1046 – 1081)
- Konstantin (1081–1101)
- Mihailo II (1101–1102)
- Dobroslav II (1102)
- Kočopar (1102–1103)
- Vladimir (1103–1114)
- Đorđe I (1114–1118)
- Grubeša (1118–1125)
- Đorđe I (1125–1131)
- Gradihna (1131–1148)
- Radoslav (1146–1148/62)
- Mihailo III (1162–1186)
- Desislava (1186–1189, disputed)

== Zeta, crown land ==
=== House of Nemanjić ===
- Vukan (1189–1208)
- Đorđe (1208–1216)
- Radoslav (1216–1243)
- Beloslava (1243–1267)
- Uroš (1267–1276)
- Jelena (1276–1309)
- Stefan (1309–1314)
- Konstantin (1314–1322)
- Dušan (1322–1331)

=== Non-hereditary governors ===
- Đuraš Ilijić (1331–1362)

== Principality of Zeta/Montenegro ==
=== House of Balšić ===
- Balša I (1356–1362)
- Đurađ I (1362–1378)
- Balša II (1378–1385)
- Đurađ II (1385–1403)
- Balša III (1403–1421)

=== House of Crnojević ===
- Đurađ III (1421–1435)
- Gojčin (1435-1451)
- Stefan I (1451–1465)
- Ivan I (1465–1490)
- Đurađ IV (1490–1496)
- Stefan II (1496–1499, nominal ruler)
- Ivan II (1499–1515, nominal ruler)
- Đurađ V (1515–1516, nominal ruler)

== Prince-Bishopric of Montenegro ==
=== Non-hereditary Metropolitans ===
- Vavila (1516–1520)
- German II (1520–1530)
- Pavle (1530–1532)
- Vasilije I (1532–1540)
- Nikodim (1540)
- Romi (1540–1559)
- Makarije (1560–1561)
- Ruvim II (1561–1569)
- Pahomije II (1569–1579)
- Gerasim (1575–1582)
- Venijamin (1582–1591)
- Nikanor and Stefan (1591–1593)
- Ruvim III (1593–1636)
- Mardarije I (1639–1649)
- Visarion I (1649–1659)
- Mardarije II (1659–1673)
- Ruvim IV (1673–1685)
- Vasilije II (1685)
- Visarion II (1685–1692)
- Sava I (1694–1697)

=== Hereditary Metropolitans ===
Picture	^{Title}Name (Birth–Death)	Reign	House	Notes
	^{Prince-Bishop (Note: The official theocratic title was; "Prince-Bishop (or Vladika) and the Lord of Montenegro" (Владика и господар Црне Горе).)} Danilo I (1670–1735)	July 19, 1697 – January 11, 1735	Petrović-Njegoš	Founder of the House of Petrović-Njegoš.
	^{Prince-Bishop} Sava II (1702–1782)	January 11, 1735 – March 7, 1781	Petrović-Njegoš	Ruled jointly with Vasilije III from 1750 until 1766.
	^{Prince-Bishop} Vasilije III (1709–1766)	August 11, 1750 – March 10, 1766	Petrović-Njegoš	Ruled jointly with Sava II.
	^{"Tsar", Lord} Stephen the Little (c. 1739 – 1773)	October 17, 1767 – September 22, 1773	None	Impostor who was purported to be the dead Emperor of Russia Peter III in exile. Proclaimed leader by the people of Montenegro and ruled the country as an absolute monarch, sidelining Prince-Bishop Sava II.
	^{Prince-Bishop} Arsenije II (fl. 1766 – 1784)	March 7, 1781 – May 15, 1784	None (Plamenac)	Succeed Sava II Petrović-Njegoš as the Metropolitan of Cetinje and as the Prince-Bishop. Non-hereditary.
	^{Prince-Bishop} Petar I (1747–1830)	October 13, 1784 – October 30, 1830	Petrović-Njegoš	Canonized as Saint Peter of Cetinje by the Serbian Orthodox Church.
	^{Prince-Bishop} Petar II (November 13, 1813 – October 31, 1851)	October 30, 1830 – October 31, 1851	Petrović-Njegoš	Most famous as a poet. His notable works include The Mountain Wreath, The Ray of the Microcosm, The Serbian Mirror and False Tsar Stephen the Little.
	^{Prince-Bishop} Danilo II (May 25, 1826 – August 13, 1860)	October 31, 1851 – March 13, 1852	Petrović-Njegoš	Proclaimed Prince of Montenegro.

== Principality of Montenegro (1852–1910) ==
=== House of Petrović-Njegoš ===
Picture	^{Title}Name (Birth–Death)	Reign	Territory	Notes
	^{Prince, Lord (Note: The official royal title was; "Knjaz (or Prince) and the Lord (Gospodar) of Montenegro" (Књаз и господар Црне Горе).)} Danilo I (May 25, 1826 – August 13, 1860)	March 13, 1852 – August 13, 1860	Principality of Montenegro (see; Reign of Danilo I)	First secular ruler of Montenegro after centuries of theocratic rule. Assassinated in Kotor.
	^{Prince, Lord} Nikola I (October 7, 1841 – March 1, 1921)	August 13, 1860 – August 28, 1910	Principality of Montenegro (see; Reign of Nikola I)	Proclaimed King of Montenegro.

== Kingdom of Montenegro (1910–1918) ==
=== House of Petrović-Njegoš ===
Picture	^{Title}Name (Birth–Death)	Reign	Territory	Notes
	^{King} Nikola I (October 7, 1841 – March 1, 1921)	August 28, 1910 – November 26, 1918	Kingdom of Montenegro	In exile from January 15, 1916, due to the Montenegrin campaign of World War I. Deposed on the Podgorica Assembly on November 26, 1918.

== Pretenders to the Montenegrin throne since 1918 ==
=== House of Petrović-Njegoš ===
- Nikola I Petrović-Njegoš (26 November 1918 – 1 March 1921)
- Danilo Petrović-Njegoš (1 March 1921 – 7 March 1921)
- Mihajlo Petrović-Njegoš (7 March 1921 – 24 March 1986)
- Nikola Petrović-Njegoš (24 March 1986 – present)

== Family tree ==
Family tree of Montenegrin rulers until 1515

Katzenelnbogen	Katzenelnbogen	Katzenelnbogen	Katzenelnbogen	Katzenelnbogen	Katzenelnbogen	Katzenelnbogen	Katzenelnbogen	Katzenelnbogen	Katzenelnbogen	Katzenelnbogen	Katzenelnbogen	Katzenelnbogen	Katzenelnbogen	Katzenelnbogen	Katzenelnbogen	Katzenelnbogen
	Katzenelnbogen	Katzenelnbogen	Katzenelnbogen	Katzenelnbogen	Katzenelnbogen	Katzenelnbogen	Katzenelnbogen	Katzenelnbogen	Katzenelnbogen	Katzenelnbogen	Katzenelnbogen	Katzenelnbogen	Katzenelnbogen	Katzenelnbogen	Katzenelnbogen	Katzenelnbogen
	Katzenelnbogen	Katzenelnbogen	Katzenelnbogen	Katzenelnbogen	Katzenelnbogen	Katzenelnbogen	Katzenelnbogen	Katzenelnbogen	Katzenelnbogen	Katzenelnbogen	Katzenelnbogen	Katzenelnbogen	Katzenelnbogen	Katzenelnbogen	Katzenelnbogen	Katzenelnbogen
		Peter of Duklja late 10th cent.		Dragomir r. 1016-1018			Theodore; Monomachos				Eustathios; Argyros
				VOJISLAVLJEVIĆ
		Saint; John Vladimir r. c. 1000-1016		Stephen; Vojislav I Dobroslav r. 1018-1043	Neda r. 1043/4-1046	unknown sibling		Constantine IX; Monomachos of Byzantium c. 1000-1055	Zoe of Byzantium; 978-1050	Romanos III of Byzantium; 968-1034		Basil; Argyros c. 970-1023
				Gojislav r. 1046	Michael I r. c. 1046-1081	unknown daughter		Radoslav; Vojislavljević				unknown daughter	John Doukas died 1088
		Jaquinta of Bari d. c. 1118	Constantine; Bodin r. 1081-1101		Dobroslav (II) r. 1101-1102 died 1103	Petrislav of Rascia d. 1083		Branislav; Radoslavljević	Constantine X of Byzantium; 1006-1067	Eudokia; Makrembolitissa c. 1021-1096		Romanos IV of Byzantium c. 1030-1072	Andronikos; Doukas died 1077
		George I r. 1113-118, 1125-1131	Michael II r. 1101-1102	Vladimir; Mihailović		Vukan of Serbia c. 1050-1112	Marko; Petrislavljević of Rascia	Kočapar r. 1102-1103		Gradinja r. 1131/5-1142/6		Constantine; Diogenes d. 1073	Irene; Doukaina c. 1066-1138
			Grubeša r. 1118-1125	Vladimir II ?-1103-1118		unknown daughter	Uroš I of Serbia c. 1083-1145	Anna; Diogenissa c. 1074-1115		Radoslav r. 1146-1148		Constantine; Angelos c. 1093-a. 1166	Theodore; Komnene born 1096
						John Doukas c. 1126-1200	Desa r. 1149-1162	Zavida or Uroš the White		Michael III r. 1165/75-1186/9	Desislava r. 1186-1189?	Andronikos; Doukas Angelos c. 1133-1185
								NEMANJIĆ
			Maria; Petraliphaina	Theodore of Thessalonica died c. 1253		Michael I of Epirus died c.1214	John; Petraliphas	Stephen; Nemanja c.1113-1199		Anastasia d. 1200		Alexios III of Byzantium c. 1153-1211
										ASEN
				Vukan r. c. 1190-1207		Michael II of Epirus died c. 1267	Theodora; Petraliphaina of Arta	Irene of Thessalonica		Ivan Asen II of Bulgaria c. 1190-1241	Stephen the First-Crowned of Serbia c. 1165-1128	Eudokia; Angelina of Byzantium c. 1173-1211		Anna		Irene; Angelina of Byzantium
				George II r. 1208-1216 d. 1243		John I of Thessaly died 1289				Helen of Anjou c. 1235-1276- 1306-a. 1314	Stephen; Uroš I the Great c. 1223-1267- 1276-1277	Stephen; Vladislav of Serbia c. 1198-a. 1264		Beloslava of Bulgaria r. 1243-1267	Andronicus; Palaeologus c. 1190-c. 1250	Theodora; Angelina; Palaiologinaa
		ĐURAŠEVIĆ
		Đuraš; Vrančić		Dmitar; Nemanjić				George Terter I of Bulgaria died c. 1308	Kira Maria of Bulgaria				Constantine; Palaeologus of Byzantium died 1271		Michael VIII of Byzantium; 1223-1282
		Ilija; Đurašić		Vratislav; Nemanjić		Helen; Doukaina; Angelina of Thessaly	Demetrius; Doukas; Komnenos; Koutroules	Anna of Bulgaria died a. 1304		Stephen; Uroš II Milutin of Serbia c. 1253-1321		Helen	unknown daughter		Andronicus II of Byzantium; 1258-1332
					BALŠIĆ
		Đuraš; Ilijić r. 1326-1362		Vratko; Nemanjić; Jug Bogdan	Balša I r. 1356-1362	Stephen; Constantine c. 1283-1314-1322			Stephen; Uroš II; Dečanski; 1276-1309-1314-1331				Theodora of Bulgaria died a. 1332		Simonida of Byzantium c. 1294-a. 1336
		Crnoje; Đurašević		Milica of Serbia c. 1335-1405	Stracimir; Balšić died 1373	George I r. 1362-1378		Balša II r. 1378-1385			Stephen; Dušan the Mighty c. 1308-1322-1331-1355
		CRNOJEVIĆ
		Radič; Crnojević		Jelena; Lazarević; 1365/6-1443	George I r. 1385-1403
		Đurađ; Đurašević		Balša II; 1387-1403-1421
		Gojčin r. 1435-1451
		Stephen I r. 1451-1465
		Ivan I r. 1465-1490
	Stephen II; 1469-1496-1499	George IV r. 1490-1496 died 1514
		Ivan II r. 1498-1514
		George V r. 1514-1515

== See also ==
- List of heads of state of Montenegro, for a comprehensive list of Montenegrin heads of state since 1696.
