= List of monarchs of Duklja =

This is a list of monarchs of Duklja.

== List of monarchs ==
Byzantine Empire	Bulgaria	Holy Roman Empire	Rascia	Independent

Picture	Name	Title	Reign	Notes	Genealogy
	Peter	"archon of Dioklea"	?	He was an archon of Duklja in the 10th or 11th century. The only information on him is from a seal found in the 19th century, which is decorated on the obverse with a bust of the Virgin Mary holding a medallion of Christ and flanked by two cruciform invocative monograms. The text is in Greek letters, saying "Petrou, Archontos Diokleias, Amin" (ΠΕΤΡ(Ο)Υ ΑΡΧΟΝΤΟΣ ΔΙΟΚΛ(Ε)ΙΑ(Σ) ΑΜΗΝ) - Peter, archon of Dioklea, Amen. The seal shows that although Duklja underwent turmoil in the 9th century, the region still continued under Byzantine rule, or if not authority, influence.	
Non-contemporary	Jovan Vladimir	Prince	fl. 1000–1016	Jovan fought to protect Duklja from Bulgarian expansion, making an alliance with Byzantium; Bulgaria however conquered Duklja in 997 and took Jovan Vladimir prisoner. Jovan ruled Duklja as a vassal of the Bulgarian empire until 1016.	CPD: Petrislav
Non-contemporary	Stefan Vojislav	"Prince of the Serbs" or "of Serbia" toparch of the Dalmatian kastra of Zeta and Ston	1018–1034; 1040–1043	Overthrew the Byzantine supremacy over Serbs in Duklja; founder of the Vojislavljević dynasty; in 1035 rebelled against the Byzantine Empire, but forced to sign an armistice; went to war again in 1040, which would be continued by his heir and son, Mihailo. Except Duklja, his realm included Travunija with Konavli and Zahumlje.	CPD: Dragomir
	Neda	Queen		As queen, she co-ruled with her sons, the princes.	
	Mihailo I	"Prince of Tribals or Serbs" "King of Slavs"	1050–1077; 1077–1081	Crowned King by the pope in 1077.	Stefan Vojislav
Non-contemporary	Constantine Bodin	"protosebastos and executor of Dioklea and Serbia" King (titular)	1081–1085; 1085–1091	Tsar of Bulgaria as Peter III in 1072.	
	Dobroslav II	King (titular)	1101–1102	Overthrown by Vukan of Rascia and Kočopar.	
	Kočapar	Unknown	1102–1103	Brought to power by Vukan of Rascia. Vassal of the Grand Principality of Rascia. Killed in battle against Zachlumoi.	
	Vladimir	Unknown	1103–1113	Married daughter of Vukan of Rascia. Vassal of the Grand Principality of Rascia. He was poisoned by his cousin Đorđe.	
	Đorđe	Unknown	1113–1118	Son of Constantine Bodin. Đorđe was overthrown by Uroš I of Rascia in 1118.	
	Grubeša	Unknown	1118–1125	Overthrew Đorđe with the help of the Byzantines.	
	Đorđe	Unknown	1125–1131	Second rule. Vassal of the Grand Principality of Rascia.	
	Gradinja	Prince	1131–1146	Appointed to Doclean throne by Byzantines after Đorđe's defeat in the second Doclean-Byzantine War.	
	Radoslav	Prince	1146–1148	Byzantine vassal. Only dynastic member to be mentioned as Prince of Doclea.	
	Mihailo III	Prince	1148–1186	Byzantine vassal.	
	Desislava	Princess (disputed)	1186–1189	According to Professor Božidar Šekularac, she was the last ruler of Duklja.	

Duklja continues as a crownland of Grand Principality of Serbia, under Vukan Nemanjić and Đorđe Nemanjić.

== Monarchs according to the Chronicle of the Priest of Duklja ==
The following monarchs are mentioned only in the Chronicle of the Priest of Duklja (CPD), written by a Catholic monk of the Cistercian order by the name of Roger (Rudger) at the request of Croatian Ban Paul Šubić. It was written in two versions – the first one in Split in 1298 while Roger was handling the Archbishop of Split's finances, and the second ca. 1300, while he was the Archbishop of Antivari (Bar). The chronicle, built round a core written in Slavonic, but added to by a bishop of Bar intent on demonstrating his diocese' superiority over that of Split, is one of the oldest known written sources, but only Latin redactions from the 16th and 17th centuries have been preserved.

Historians have largely discounted it, though it contains material on the early history of the South Slavs. The work describes the Slavs as a peaceful people imported by the monarchs of the Goths, who invaded the area in the 5th century, but it doesn't attempt to elaborate on how and when this happened. Furthermore, it mentions Bosnia (Bosnam) and Rascia (Rassa) as the two Serbian lands, while describing the southern Dalmatian Zahumlje, Travunia and Duklja (most of today's Herzegovina, Montenegro, as well as parts of Croatia and Albania) as Croatian lands in the Early Middle Ages. These claims contradict the Byzantine work De Administrando Imperio and other contemporary sources.

Various inaccurate or simply false claims make it an unreliable source. This work is, as the majority of modern historians think, mainly fictional, or wishful thinking, however, it does give us a unique insight into the whole era from the point of view of the indigenous Slavic population. One of the prime controversies of the Chronicle, lies in the fact that the Antivari archiepiscopate did not exist between 1142 and 1198 – and that is the time Rudger is supposed to have been the Archbishop.

Name	Notes	Genealogy
Hvalimir	He held the region of Zeta with its cities and the following županijas: Lusca, Podlugiae, Gorsca, Cupelnich, Obliquus, Prapratna, Cermenica and Budva with Cuceva and Gripuli.	
Petrislav	Some historians identify him with Peter of Diokleia (whose seal belong to the 10th or 11th century) which would make Petrislav the earliest ruler whose existence is confirmed by primary historical sources. According to the chronicle, after his father's death, the rule was divided among his three sons: Petrislav ruled Zeta, while Dragimir ruled Travunia and Zachumlia (to the west), and Miroslav ruled Podgoria (to the north). After the youngest brother Miroslav died, Petrislav, as the oldest, inherited his land, thus bringing the whole of Duklja (Zeta and Podgoria) under his rule. Petrislav was buried in the Church of the Holy Virgin Mary in Krajina. He was succeeded by his son Jovan Vladimir.	
After Jovan Vladimir (fl. 998)
Dragomir	he ruled Travunia and Hum. At the death of Vladimir, he ruled Duklja for two years, being murdered in 1018 by locals of Kotor.	
Dobroslav II		
Mihailo II		
Dobroslav III		
Mihailo III		

== See also ==
- List of Serbian monarchs
- List of rulers of Zeta
- List of rulers of Montenegro

== Notes ==
=== Sources ===
- Stephenson, Paul (July 2010). "Chronicle of the Priest of Duklja, Chapters 30-35". Translated Excerpts from Byzantine Sources. Paul Stephenson.
- Fine, John V. A. Jr. (1991) [1983]. The Early Medieval Balkans: A Critical Survey from the Sixth to the Late Twelfth Century. Ann Arbor: University of Michigan Press. ISBN 0-472-08149-7.
- Кунчер, Драгана (2009). Gesta Regum Sclavorum. Vol. 1. Београд-Никшић: Историјски институт, Манастир Острог.
- Живковић, Тибор (2009). Gesta Regum Sclavorum. Vol. 2. Београд-Никшић: Историјски институт, Манастир Острог.
- Живковић, Тибор (2006). Портрети српских владара: IX-XII век (Portraits of Serbian Rulers: IX-XII Century). Београд: Завод за уџбенике и наставна средства. ISBN 9788617137548.
