= Albania under Serbia in the Middle Ages =

Period of Serbian rule in Albania

Albania under Serbia in the Middle Ages was a period of time where Serbia gained extensive amounts of territory within the borders of modern-day Albania. Firstly, as part of the Serbian Grand Principality and later as part of the Serbian Empire, Serbian control in southern Albania is unclear. Some suggest they acquired towns, but others believe they only obtained submission, possibly nominal, from Albanian tribes. Central and southern Albanian towns were not conquered until 1343–45. Between 1272 and 1368, some areas of the modern-day state were also ruled by the Angevins as the Kingdom of Albania. In the late 14th century, Albanian Principalities were created throughout Albania.

== Background ==
In the 11th century, the Serbian states were concentrated around two principalities Zeta and Raška. In 1172, Stefan Nemanja managed to unite these two principalities into the first medieval Serbian state. Stefan Dečanski made a breakthrough by defeating Bulgaria at Kyustendil in 1330. This battle made Serbia the leading Balkan power. From the late 13th century increasing wealth from mining enabled Serbia's rulers to recruit mercenaries, while they also managed to significantly advance their military equipment. However, it was Stefan Dušan who became the greatest conqueror in Serbian history. Trade and mining had now made Serbia rich and Dušan used this wealth to recruit large, mostly German, mercenary force. His army consisted mostly of Serbian feudal forces, but included also Albanians, Greeks and other European ethnic groups. By the period of 1343–1345, all Albanian lands was fully under Serbian rule. And in 1345, Stefan Dušan were to be crowned 'Emperor of the Serbs and Greeks' - to which it was later added 'Bulgarians and Albanians'.

== Conquests and campaigns ==
=== Military ===
Serbian military tactics consisted of wedge-shaped heavy cavalry attacks with horse archers on the flanks. Many foreign mercenaries were in the Serbian army, mostly Germans as cavalry and Spaniards as infantry. The army also had personal mercenary guards for the emperor, mainly German knights. A German nobleman, Palman, became the commander of the Serbian "Alemannic Guard" in 1331 upon crossing Serbia on the way to Jerusalem; he became leader of all mercenaries in the Serbian Army. The main strength of the Serbian army were the heavily armoured knights feared for their ferocious charge and fighting skills, as well as hussars, versatile light cavalry formations armed mainly with spears and crossbows, ideal for scouting, raiding and skirmishing.

Albanians also often played a role in the medieval Serbian army. Emperor Stefan Dušan was known to have recruited light cavalry composed of 15,000 Albanians, armed with spears and swords.

=== Serbian conquests in Albania ===
The founder of the Serbian monarchy, Stefan Nemanja managed to control a part of northern Albania, which included cities of Shkodër, Dajç and Drivast. He was a native of what is now Podgorica, whence he built up a compact Serbian state, comprising the Zeta (modern Montenegro), and the Land of Hum (the "Hill" country, now the Herzegovina), northern Albania and the modern kingdom of Serbia, with a sea-frontage on the Bocche di Cattaro, whose municipality in 1186 passed a resolution describing him as "Our Lord Nemanja, Great jupan of Rascia."

In 1282 the Serbian king Stefan Uroš II Milutin gained control of the Albanian cities of Lezhë and Debar and, at some time in 1284, the city of Dyrrachion (modern Durrës).

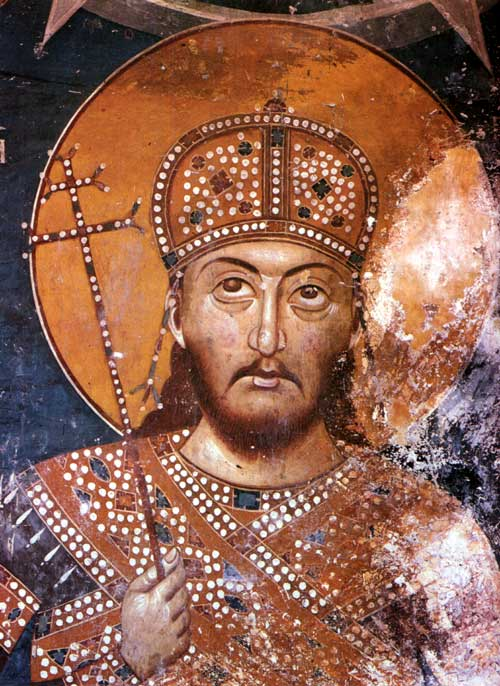
14th-century detail of Stefan Dušan in the Lesnovo Monastery, Serbia

During the reign of Stefan Dušan, 1331–55, taking advantage of the Byzantine civil war of 1341–1347, the area of Elbasan, Krujë, Berat and Vlora (Principality of Valona) were added to the nascent Serbian Empire. In 1346 the patriarchal throne was permanently established at the Peć Monastery. In 1346, after Epirus and Thessaly were added to the Serbian Empire, Dušan was crowned the emperor of the Serbs and Greeks in the city of Skopje. A legal code was promulgated and the bishopric of Peć was proclaimed a patriarchate which established the Serbian Orthodox Church as independent from Constantinople. Prizren became the political capital of the Serbian Empire and was the chief Serbian city of trade and commerce. After the death of Dušan in 1355, Kosovo was ruled by King Vukašin Mrnjavčević, who was a co-ruler with Tsar Stefan Uroš V, the last of the Nemanjić rulers.

==== Conflict with the Kingdom of Albania ====
Philip V of France and Pope John XXII, sought to turn the Albanian nobles in northern Albania against Stefan Milutin. In June 1319, the Pope sent several letters to the local feudal lords, urging them to overthrow the rule of the Serbian king. Stefan Milutin has suppressed rebels without much difficulty.

The pressure of the Serbian Kingdom on the Kingdom of Albania grew especially under the leadership of Stefan Dušan. Although the fate of city of Durrës, the capital of the Kingdom, is unknown, by 1346 all Albania was reported to be under the rule of Dušan.

=== Serbian conquests in Epirus ===
After Emperor Stefan Uroš IV Dušan conquered Epirus and Acarnania in 1348, he appointed as governor of these regions Simeon Uroš, whom he had granted the title of despotes traditionally reserved for emperors' brothers and younger sons. Simeon Uroš consolidated his position in relation to the local aristocracy by marrying Thomais, the daughter of the former ruler of Epirus, John Orsini.

Simeon Uroš's relatively uneventful governorship was interrupted when, shortly after Dušan's death in 1355, his brother-in-law Nikephoros II Orsini, the deposed ruler of Epirus, reappeared in Greece and gained the support of the nobility in Thessaly and Epirus. In 1356 Nikephoros entered Epirus and forced Simeon Uroš to flee to Kastoria.

In the summer of 1358, Nikephoros II Orsini, the last despot of Epirus of the Orsini dynasty, fought with the Albanian chieftains in Acheloos, Acarnania. The Albanian chieftains won the war and they managed to create two new states in the southern territories of the Despotate of Epirus. Because a number of Albanian lords actively supported the successful Serbian campaign in Thessaly and Epirus, the Serbian Tsar granted them specific regions and offered them the Byzantine title of despotes in order to secure their loyalty.

The two Albanian lead states were: the first with its capital in Arta was under the Albanian nobleman Peter Losha, and the second, centered in Angelokastron, was ruled by Gjin Bua Shpata. After the death of Peter Losha in 1374, the Albanian despotates of Arta and Angelocastron were united under the rule of Despot Gjin Bua Shpata. The territory of this despotate was from the Corinth Gulf to Acheron River in the North, neighboring with the Principality of John Zenevisi, another state created in the area of the Despotate of Epirus. The Despotate of Epirus managed to control in this period only the eastern part of Epirus, with its capital in Ioannina. During this period the Despotate of Epirus was ruled by Thomas II Preljubović, who was in an open conflict with Gjin Bue Shpata. In 1375, Gjin Bue Shpata started an offensive in Ioannina, but he couldn't invade the city, as Preljubović received help from the Ottomans to aid him in the cities defense. Although Shpata married with the sister of Thomas II Preljubović, Helena their war did not stop.

The Serbian military general Preljub died in late 1355 or early 1356 after being involved in a clash with local Albanians in Epirus.

== Religious Society ==
The Serbian rulers in Albania had affected the religion of the country’s inhabitants, and constructed many religious sites and shrines. The Serbian nobleman Kesar Novak, a local Serbian feudal Lord in the Prespa region, had constructed St. Mary's Church in Maligrad in the year 1369. The church has frescoes and Greek inscriptions dated to 1369. Frescoes exist of the family of Kesar Novak, with his Greek wife Kalia.

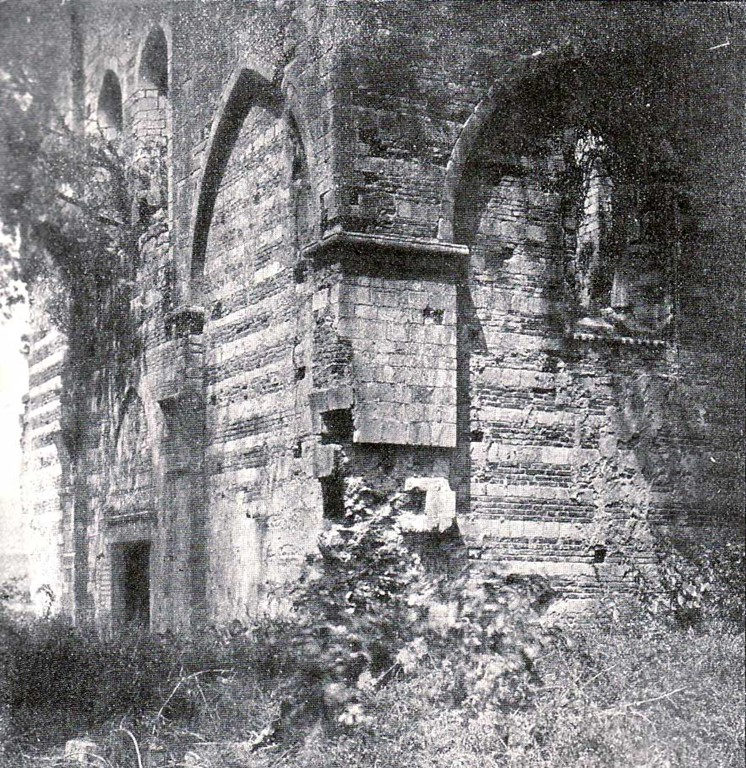
An image of the Shirgj Church in the 1890s by Jules Alexandre Théodore Degrand

The Shirgj Church was built in two phases, starting in 1290 by Helen of Serbia. The Chronicle of the Priest of Duklja suggests that the monastery was built upon a church used as a royal mausoleum for several predominately Catholic members of the Serbian Vojislavljević dynasty of Duklja including Mihailo I, Constantine Bodin, Dobroslav, Vladimir and Gradinja. Inscriptions by the Serbian King Stefan Milutin suggest that major construction works also commenced in 1318, suggesting that the monastery was not completely built at a single point in time. A document dated 22 October 1330 mentions the monastery as the rendezvous point of the king of Rascia with ambassadors of Ragusa. In another document dated 1333, the monastery is mentioned as the customs' place of the kingdom of Rascia.

== See also ==
- Serbs in Albania
- Albania in the Middle Ages
- Serbia in the Middle Ages
- Serbian Empire
- Kingdom of Albania (medieval)
