= Shirgj Church =

13th-century church in Albania

Shirgj Monastery
- Manastiri i Shën Shirgjit dhe Bakut
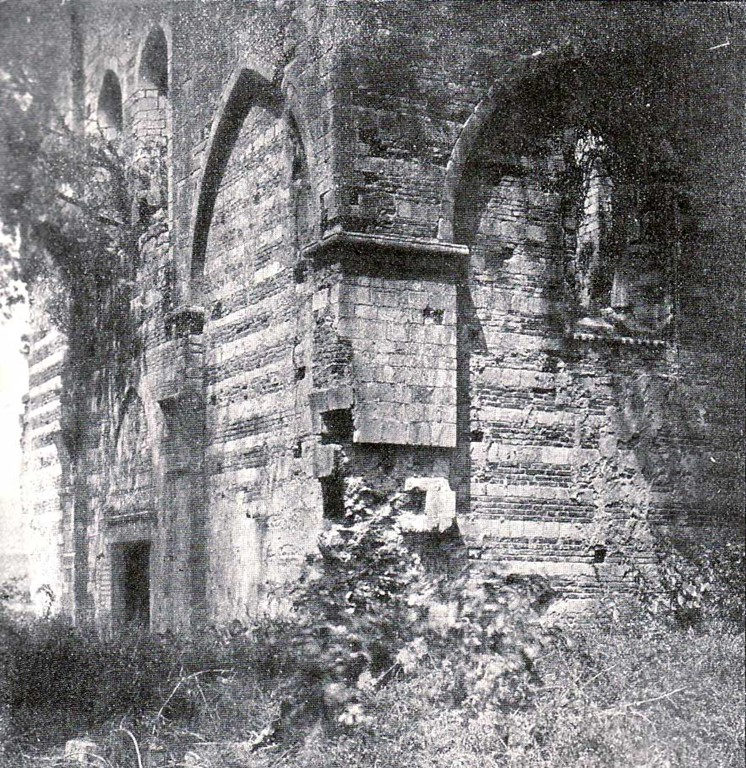
- An image of the 1890s by Jules Alexandre Théodore Degrand
- Interactive map of Shirgj Monastery

Monastery information
- Order: Benedictine
- Established: 1290
- Disestablished: No longer active
- Dedication: Sergius and Bacchus
- Diocese: Roman Catholic Archdiocese of Shkodër–Pult

People
- Founder: Saint Helen of Serbia

Architecture
- Status: ruin
- Heritage designation: Cultural Monument of Albania
- Style: Gothic architecture with features from the Romanesque

Site
- Location: near Shirgj, Shkodër County, Albania
- Coordinates: 41.9905°N 19.4399°E
- Visible remains: southern wall
- Public access: yes

The Shirgj Church (Albanian: Kisha e Shirqit/Shirgjit), also known as the Monastery of Saints Sergius and Bacchus (Albanian: Manastiri i Shën Shirgjit dhe Bakut), is a ruined former Benedictine monastery in the village of Shirgj on the river Buna in northern Albania. The church was built by Saint Helen of Serbia in 1290, dedicated to Saints Sergius and Bacchus, allegedly on top of a pre-6th century basilica according to circumstantial evidence. However, no archaeological evidence exists of a prior structure.

== History ==
=== Early history ===
The church was built in two phases, starting in 1290 by Helen of Serbia. Apparently, the monastery was constructed on top of an existing structure: according to apocryphal documents, the original monastery is mentioned as erected by Justinian, whereas in other sources its existence is mentioned as an abbey starting from 1100. The presence of a pillar of black granite, a material which originates from Syria and was often used in 6th-century basilicas in Albania, suggests that the construction of the original building may lie in the 6th century. The Chronicle of the Priest of Duklja suggests that the monastery was built upon a church used as a royal mausoleum for several predominately Catholic members of the Serbian Vojislavljević dynasty of Duklja including Mihailo I, Constantine Bodin, Dobroslav, Vladimir and Gradinja. However, no archaeological evidence exists of a pre-existing structure.

Inscriptions by the Serbian King Stefan Milutin suggest that major construction works also commenced in 1318, suggesting that the monastery was not completely built at a single point in time. A document dated 22 October 1330 mentions the monastery as the rendezvous point of the king of Rascia with ambassadors of Ragusa. In another document dated 1333, the monastery is mentioned as the customs' place of the kingdom of Rascia.

=== Modern history ===
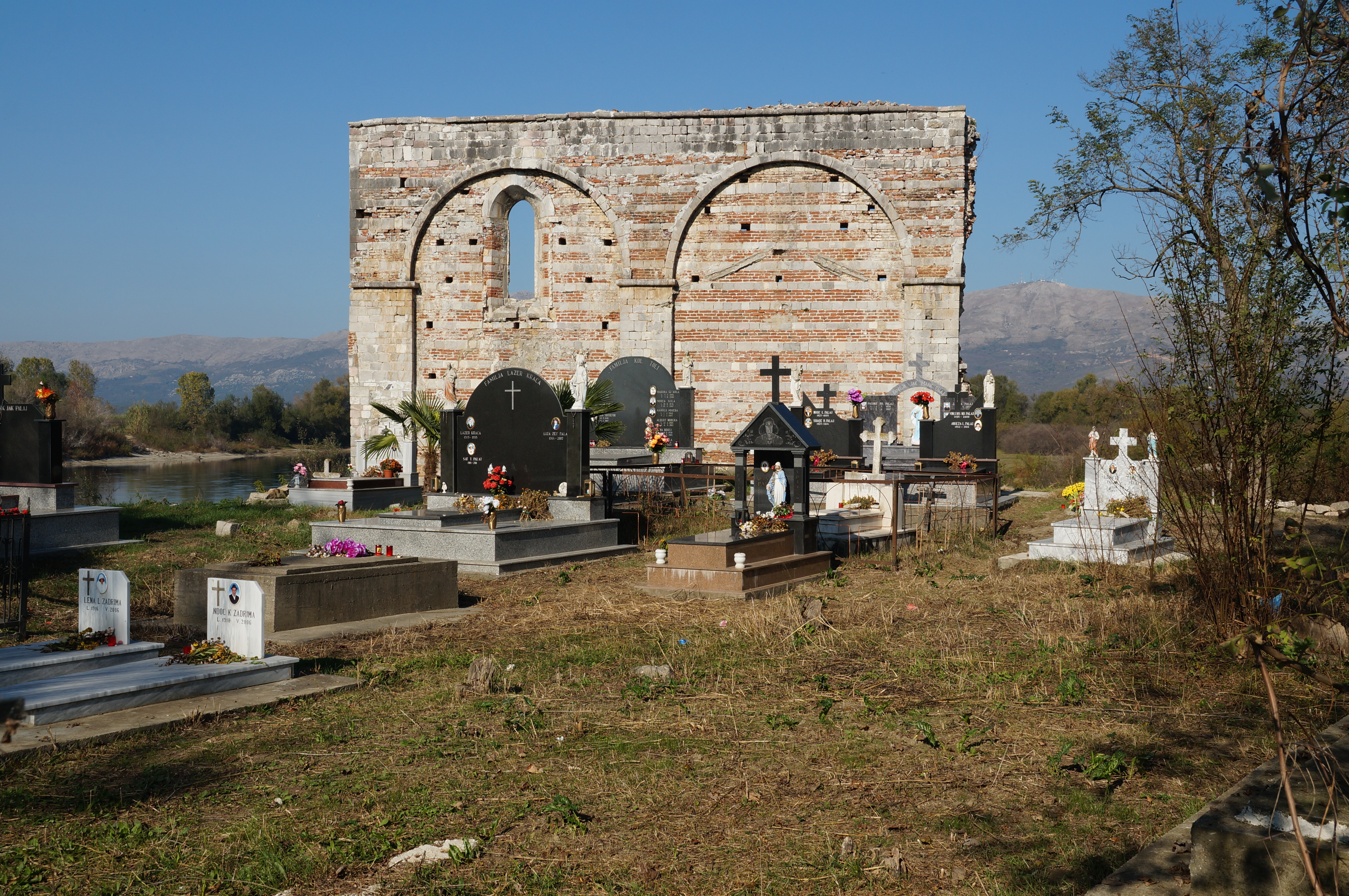
The ruins nowadays

Marino Bizzi, the Archbishop of Antivari at the time, wrote in a 1611 report to the Vatican that heavy damages were inflicted to the church as a result of the Ottoman presence in Albania. In 1684, Pjetër Bogdani reported that the church's bell had been put underground. Daniele Farlati also mentioned the church in his Illyricum sacrum. In 1790 archbishop Frang Borci informed Coletti, Farlati's assistant, who was about to republish Illyricum sacrum, that the church was the most beautiful of Albania.

The French consul in Iskodra noted that the monastery's frescoes could still be seen in the church in 1905. At that time only three of the four perimeter walls were still standing. Ippen, then Austrian consul of Iskodra, observed that in the late 1800s and early 1900s the gravediggers of Shirgj would find old mosaics. At present, only a single wall remains and the mosaics can no longer be seen.

The monastery has been under the Vatican's jurisdiction during all of its active life. It was listed as a Monument of Culture by the Albanian government in 1970.

The ruins were visited by Patriarch Irinej of the Serbian Orthodox Church in 2014.

== Possible characteristics ==
=== Exterior ===
The monastery was a three-church basilica. The main entrance sat in the central bay of the western façade, consisting of a porch that was supported by pillars. A secondary entrance to the monastery was positioned on the southern façade. The triangular gable and walls of the monastery were constructed with alternating layers of stone and brick, while the lunette was solely made of bricks. The monastery was predominately illuminated by two large windows placed above the western side of the monastery. The roof was constructed using roof tiles at a 30 degree angle.

=== Interior ===
The monastery had six square stone pillars in the interior. The interior walls were covered with frescoes and the interior articulation was crowned with arches. The monastery had a raised semicircular apse.
