= Hvalimir =

Hvalimir is an extinct Serbian given name, that may refer to:

- Hvalimir Belojević, Duke of Travunia, ruled in late 9th century
- Hvalimir, mythological Prince of Zeta, Travunia and Podgoria, supposedly late 10th century
