= Radoslav of Duklja =

Radoslav

Prince of Duklja
- Reign: c. 1146 – c. 1149
- Predecessor: Gradinja
- Successor: Mihailo III of Duklja
- Burial: Monastery of Saints Sergius and Bacchus, Bojana
- Dynasty: Vojislavljević
- Father: Gradinja
- Mother: Zavida's daughter
- Religion: Eastern Orthodox Christian

Radoslav (Serbian Cyrillic: Радослав) was the Prince of Duklja from c. 1146 to c. 1149. As the oldest son, he succeeded as ruler of Duklja after the death of his father, Gradinja in c. 1146. He was installed by Manuel I Komnenos upon a visit to Constantinople to pay homage to the Emperor. Unlike his father who was a titular king, Radoslav had the title of Prince (knez). Radoslav began his rule at a time when the Serbs of Raška (the Vukanovići) had ambitions towards Duklja.

In ca. 1148, the political situation in the Balkans was divided by two sides, one being the alliance of the Byzantines and Venice, the other the Normans and Hungarians. The Normans were sure of the danger that the battlefield would bring from the Balkans to their area in Italy. Manuel also allied himself with the Germans after defeating the Cumans in 1148. The Serbs, Hungarians and Normans exchanged envoys, being in the interest of the Normans to stop Manuel's plans to recover Italy.

The Serbs under brothers Uroš II and Desa revolted against the Byzantines, when Manuel was in Avlona planning an offensive across the Adriatic, and this revolt posed danger to the Emperor if he would attack Italy, as the Serbs could strike at the Adriatic bases. Then, the Serbs took an offensive against Radoslav, who was a loyal Byzantine vassal. Radoslav was pushed to the southwestern corner of Duklja to Kotor, and retained only the coastal area with the brothers holding much of inland Duklja and Trebinje – over two thirds of Duklja. Radoslav sought help from the Emperor, who sent aid from Durazzo. At this moment, the Chronicle of the Priest of Duklja ends, presumably because the author of the text had died. A major war was about to erupt in the Balkans; Uroš II and Desa, in light of Byzantine retaliation, sought aid from their brother Beloš, the count palatine of Hungary. By 1150, Hungarian troops played an active role in Serbia. The fate of Radoslav is unknown.

Du Cange (1610–1688) identified Radoslav as the Vakin of the Battle of Tara (1150).

== Annotations ==
- Name: His name was Radoslav, a Slavic name. In historiography, he is sometimes identified with the patronymic Gradinić (Радослав Градинић).

== See also ==
- Duklja
- Vojislavljević dynasty
- Vukanović dynasty
- Grand Principality of Serbia

== Sources ==
- Fine, John V. A. Jr. (1991) [1983]. The Early Medieval Balkans: A Critical Survey from the Sixth to the Late Twelfth Century. Ann Arbor: University of Michigan Press. ISBN 0-472-08149-7.
- Кунчер, Драгана (2009). Gesta Regum Sclavorum. Vol. 1. Београд-Никшић: Историјски институт, Манастир Острог.
- Живковић, Тибор (2009). Gesta Regum Sclavorum. Vol. 2. Београд-Никшић: Историјски институт, Манастир Острог.
- Živković, Tibor (2008). Forging unity: The South Slavs between East and West 550-1150. Belgrade: The Institute of History, Čigoja štampa. ISBN 9788675585732.

Regnal titles
Preceded by Gradinja	Prince of Duklja (Byzantine vassal) c. 1146 – c. 1149	Succeeded by Desa
