= Gradinja =

Ruler of Duklja

- "King of Slavs" (titular)

Ruler of Duklja (titular King)
- Reign: 1131–1142 or 1135–1146
- Predecessor: George
- Successor: Radoslav
- Born: ca. 1066
- Died: 1142 or 1146
- Burial: Monastery of Saints Sergius and Bacchus, Bojana
- Spouse: Zavida's daughter
- Issue: Radoslav, Jovan, Vladimir
- Dynasty: Vojislavljević
- Father: Branislav
- Religion: Eastern Orthodox Christian

Gradinja (Serbian Cyrillic: Градиња) or Gradihna (Градихна; fl. 1125–46) was the ruler of Duklja, from either 1131 to 1142 or 1135 to 1146. Gradinja is one of many persons (alongside Branislav, Gojislav, Georgije and Grubeša among others) mentioned only in the Chronicle of the Priest of Duklja (CPD), not found in Byzantine sources as the other Serbian rulers and royalty. Gradinja was the son of Dukljan prince Branislav, and the brother of Grubeša, the former ruler (r. 1118–25).

Around 1125, Gradinja, the rival of Đorđe, married himself in Raška (Grand Principality of Serbia), with the "intent of returning the rule", according to Mavro Orbini. Following the second war with the Byzantines, in which King Đorđe was defeated and imprisoned in the stronghold of Oblik, the Byzantines appointed Gradinja as ruler of Duklja, to rule as a vassal. According to the CPD, Gradinja was gentle, tame, compassionate and a protector of the widows and the poor. The power and territorial extent of Duklja was, in the time of his reign, greatly decreased. His son Radoslav inherited the throne in 1146.

Gradinja was according to Gavro Škrivanić buried in the Church of Saints Sergius and Bacchus in Bojana.

== See also ==
- Duklja
- Vojislavljević dynasty
- Vukanović dynasty
- Grand Principality of Serbia

== Sources ==
- Fine, John Van Antwerp Jr. (1991) [1983]. The Early Medieval Balkans: A Critical Survey from the Sixth to the Late Twelfth Century. Ann Arbor, Michigan: University of Michigan Press. ISBN 0472081497.
- Curta, Florin (2006). Southeastern Europe in the Middle Ages, 500–1250. Cambridge: Cambridge University Press.
- Кунчер, Драгана (2009). Gesta Regum Sclavorum. Vol. 1. Београд-Никшић: Историјски институт, Манастир Острог.
- Живковић, Тибор (2009). Gesta Regum Sclavorum. Vol. 2. Београд-Никшић: Историјски институт, Манастир Острог.
- Živković, Tibor (2008). Forging unity: The South Slavs between East and West 550-1150. Belgrade: The Institute of History, Čigoja štampa. ISBN 9788675585732.
- Jireček, Constantin (1911). Geschichte der Serben. Vol. 1. Gotha: Perthes.
- Vizantološki institut (2006). Recueil de travaux de l'Institut des études byzantines. Institut.
- Младен Лесковац; Александар Форишковић; Чедомир Попов (2004). Српски биографски речник. Vol. 2. Будућност. p. 768. ISBN 9788683651627. "Градихна, дукљански краљ (?, друга половина XI в. — Дукља, после 1150) Познаје га само Летопис Попа Дукљанина, ко- ји у завршним поглављима описује борбе међу наследницима краља Бодина и потомцима њего- ..."

Political offices
| Preceded by George I | Ruler of Duklja (Byzantine vassal); 1131–1142 | Succeeded by Radoslav |
