= Mihailo II of Duklja =

Ruler of Duklja

Duklja and other Serbian polities in the late 11th century.

Mihailo II (Serbian Cyrillic: Михаило) was the King of Duklja from 1101 to 1102. He was the eldest son of King Constantine Bodin of Duklja and Queen Jaquinta. He succeeded his father on the throne of Duklja, but soon lost ground to cousins, pretenders to the throne. Left without support, he abdicated and retreated to monastery.

== See also ==
- Duklja
- Vojislavljević dynasty
- Grand Principality of Serbia

== Sources ==
- Fine, John V. A. Jr. (1991) [1983]. The Early Medieval Balkans: A Critical Survey from the Sixth to the Late Twelfth Century. Ann Arbor: University of Michigan Press. ISBN 0-472-08149-7.
- Кунчер, Драгана (2009). Gesta Regum Sclavorum. Vol. 1. Београд-Никшић: Историјски институт, Манастир Острог.
- Живковић, Тибор (2009). Gesta Regum Sclavorum. Vol. 2. Београд-Никшић: Историјски институт, Манастир Острог.
- Živković, Tibor (2008). Forging unity: The South Slavs between East and West 550-1150. Belgrade: The Institute of History, Čigoja štampa. ISBN 9788675585732.

Preceded by Constantine Bodin	King of Duklja; 1101–1102	Succeeded by Dobroslav II
