= Đorđe Bodinović =

King of Duklja

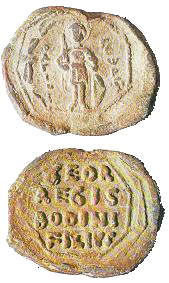
Seal of prince Đorđe, son of king Bodin

Duklja, Travunia and other Serbian polities in the late 11th century.

George I Vojislavljević or Đorđe Bodinović (Serbian Cyrillic: Ђорђе Бодиновић) (fl. 1113–1131) was a King of Duklja (Zeta) and Travunija (southern parts of present-day Montenegro, northwestern parts of present-day Albania, and southern parts of Herzegovina), from 1113 to 1118, and again from 1125 to 1131. He also briefly ruled over inner Serbia. He was a son of King Constantine Bodin, of the Vojislavljević dynasty.

With his mother, Jaquinta, he opposed the rule of his cousin, Vladimir, and influence of Vukan I of Serbia over on Duklja. Jaquinta and George had Vladimir fatally poisoned in 1118 and George was crowned king that same year. As king, he planned to liquidate his relatives who were acting as pretenders of his throne.

He unsuccessfully captured the children of knez Branislav, who had escaped to Dyrrhachium, where their uncle, Gojislav, was located. With the help of the Branislavljevići, Byzantium, led by emperor John II Komnenos attacked Duklja. Upon hearing this, George was forced to withdraw to his castle, Obliquus, on the Taraboš. In the meantime, however, the Byzantines has conquered Scutari and soon the rest of Duklja. Jaquinta was captured in Kotor and as a captive was sent to Constantinople where she died.

Defeated, George had escaped to inner Serbia, marking the end of his first rule. Byzantium had enthroned Grubeša, Branislav's son, as king of Duklja.

Several years later, in 1125, George, with the help of Serbian forces, attacked Duklja. In the ensuing battle in Bar, Grubeša was killed and George retook his kingdom. George decided to split control of Duklja with Grubeša's two brothers, Draghina and Dragila, with whom he established friendly relations with.

On Dragila's advice, George invaded inner Serbia and conquered it. George decided to take full control of Duklja and destroy any relative who dared oppose him. He captured Michael, Vladimir's son, and Dragila and had them both imprisoned. Draghina, on the other hand, had escaped with his nephews to Durrës, which was under Byzantine protection. They were joined by Draghina's brother, Gradhina, who was at Zachlumia at the time.

The Byzantines, with George's relatives, declared war once more on Duklja. Byzantine forces captured all Dukljan territory from Bar to Podgorica. However, the Byzantines had to halt all advances because the army's head commander had to return to Constantinople.

George used this to his advantage and unsuccessfully attacked Obliquus, where his relatives were fortified. A Byzantine offensive soon followed suit in which Rascian forces had joined, siding with Byzantium. In the presence of the Byzantine army, George and his forces withdrew to his fortress, Oblon. However, his forces started a rebellion and Oblon was captured. George was taken as a captive to Constantinople, where he was imprisoned, and died.

Gradhina was crowned as king of Duklja by the Byzantines in 1131.

Seal of Đorđe, from the time when he was still a prince, was discovered in Bulgaria and published in 1938.

== See also ==
- Duklja
- Travunija
- Vojislavljević dynasty
- List of rulers of Montenegro

== Sources ==
- Ćirković, Sima (2004). The Serbs. Malden: Blackwell Publishing. ISBN 9781405142915.
- Fine, John Van Antwerp Jr. (1991) [1983]. The Early Medieval Balkans: A Critical Survey from the Sixth to the Late Twelfth Century. Ann Arbor, Michigan: University of Michigan Press. ISBN 0472081497.
- Gerassimov, Theodore (1938). "Un sceau en plomb de Georges fils du roi Bodine". Studia Historico-Philologica Serdicensia. 1: 217–218.
- Živković, Tibor (2008). Forging unity: The South Slavs between East and West 550-1150. Belgrade: The Institute of History, Čigoja štampa. ISBN 9788675585732.

Regnal titles
Preceded by Župan; Vladimir	King of Duklja; 1113–1118	Succeeded by Byzantine protégé Grubeša
Preceded by Grubeša	King of Duklja; 1125–1131	Succeeded by Byzantine protégé Gradinja
