= Beloslava of Bulgaria =

Queen consort in the 13th century CE

Beloslava Белослава

Queen consort of Serbia
- Tenure: 1234–1243
- Spouse: Stefan Vladislav
- Father: Ivan Asen II
- Mother: Anna

Beloslava (Bulgarian: Белослава) was a Bulgarian princess and Queen consort of Serbia as wife of Stefan Vladislav.

== History ==
Beloslava was daughter of tsar Ivan Asen II and his first wife Anna (religious name Anisia), mentioned in the Synodik of the Bulgarian Church. The couple had another daughter — Maria, who married Manuel of Epirus. It is possible that Beloslava and her sister Maria were illegitimate children of Ivan Asen because his first marriage with Anna was not recognized by the Bulgarian Orthodox Church. But there was no doubt about the noble birth of his daughters, so both were married to men of high aristocratic status.

After the battle of Klokotnitsa, Bulgaria became the leading political power on the Balkans and Beloslava was married to Serbian prince Stefan Vladislav. The marriage was arranged by his uncle Rastko Nemanjić in order to secure good relations between the Kingdom of Serbia and the Bulgarian Empire.

In 1234 a Bulgarian-aided coup d'état in Serbia toppled king Stefan Radoslav, a son-in-law and protégé of the despotes Theodore of Epirus, and replaced him with Stefan Vladislav, who was his brother. So Beloslava become the new queen of Serbia.

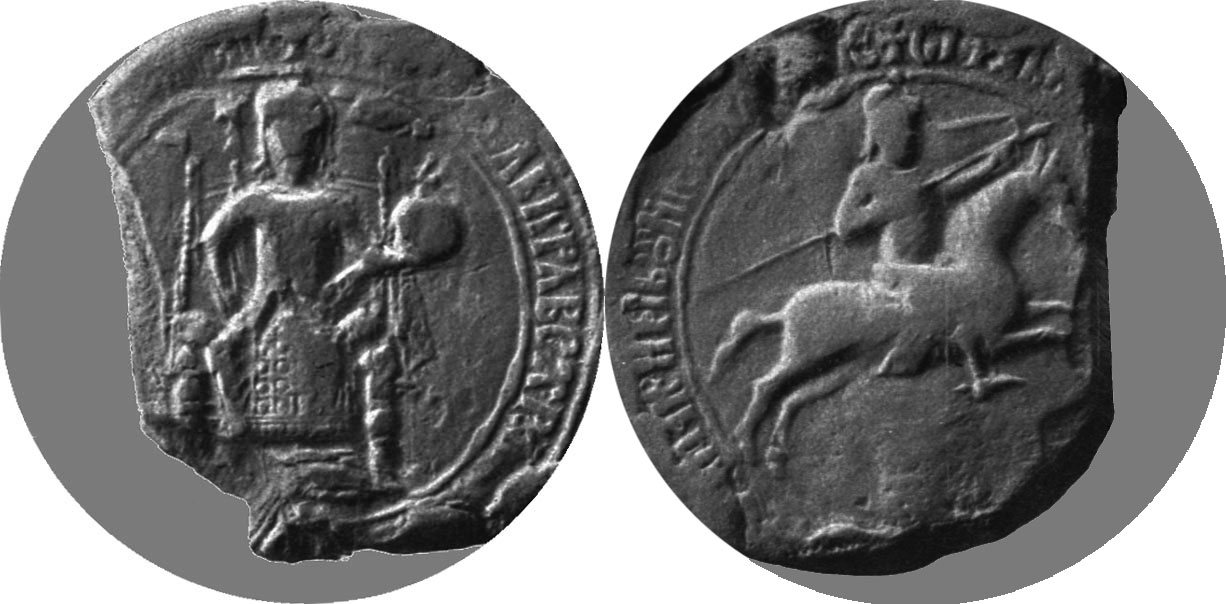
Vladislav's seal

Bulgarian political influence in Serbia ended after the death of tsar Ivan Asen II during the invasions of Tatars in Western Europe. In 1243, Stefan Vladislav was overthrown by his younger half-brother, Stefan Uroš I, and Beloslava fled to Ragusa. The new Serbian king insisted that she should be kept under strict control and, in response, received an oath, in writing, stating that Beloslava would not be allowed to return to Serbia.

Soon, the conflict between Stefan Vladislav and Stefan Uroš I was solved. After negotiations Vladislav renounced the crown and Uroš allowed him to rule Zeta as governor while keeping the title of king. Soon after, Beloslava returned and joined him maintaining also the title of queen.

== Family ==
Beloslava and Stefan Vladislav had three children:

- Stefan
- Desa—župan
- Daughter, name unknown, who married a Balkan nobleman in Croatia

== Sources ==
- Pavlov, Plamen (2006). Търновските царици [Queens of Tarnovo] (in Bulgarian). Veliko Tarnovo: ДАР-РХ.

Royal titles
Vacant Title last held by Anna Angelina Komnene Doukaina	Queen consort of Serbia; 1234–1243	Succeeded by Helen of Anjou
Preceded by Stefan Radoslav as Grand Prince of Zeta	Queen of Zeta; 1243; With: Vladislav I (King)	Succeeded by Helen of Anjou
