= Kočapar =

Ruler of Duklja

Duklja and other Serbian polities in the late 11th century.

Kočapar (Serbian Cyrillic: Кочапар) was the knez or župan of Duklja, a Serbian state, briefly in 1102–03 under the suzerainty of Vukan, Grand Prince of Serbia. He was the son of Branislav, the Prince of Duklja. Following Bodin's death in 1101, Bodin's half-brother Dobroslav II succeeded him as king of Doclea. Kočopar, Bodin's first cousin once removed, travelled from Dyrrhachium to Serbia, forging an alliance with Vukan. This alliance would prove worthy in their successful invasion of Duklja in 1102. The battle that ensued at the Morača led to the overthrow of Dobroslav II and the coronation of Kočapar to the throne. Dobroslav was subsequently banished to Serbia and a large part of Dalmatia was pillaged in the process. Vukan gave Kočapar Duklja as a fief. The two would soon break, with Vukan, sending a squad to Doclea (city), forcing Kočapar to flee to Bosnia and then Zahumlje where he also died.

== See also ==
- Duklja
- Vojislavljević dynasty
- Vukanović dynasty
- Grand Principality of Serbia

== Sources ==
- Fine, John Van Antwerp Jr. (1991) [1983]. The Early Medieval Balkans: A Critical Survey from the Sixth to the Late Twelfth Century. Ann Arbor, Michigan: University of Michigan Press. ISBN 0472081497.
- Кунчер, Драгана (2009). Gesta Regum Sclavorum. Vol. 1. Београд-Никшић: Историјски институт, Манастир Острог.
- Живковић, Тибор (2009). Gesta Regum Sclavorum. Vol. 2. Београд-Никшић: Историјски институт, Манастир Острог.
- Živković, Tibor (2008). Forging unity: The South Slavs between East and West 550-1150. Belgrade: The Institute of History, Čigoja štampa. ISBN 9788675585732.

Royal titles
Political offices
Preceded by independent Dobroslav II as King	Prince of Duklja under Vukan I (Serbian Principality); 1102–1103	Succeeded by Vladimir
