= Mihailo III of Duklja =

Ruler of Duklja

Duklja and other Serbian polities in the late 11th century.

Mihailo III (Serbian Cyrillic: Михаило) was Prince of Duklja, from c. 1180, or before, up to 1186 or 1189. He was descended from the Vojislavljević dynasty, and also cousin to Grand Prince Stefan Nemanja of Serbia. The Principality of Duklja was tributary to the Byzantine Empire until 1180, when Emperor Manuel I died and Empire plunged into turmoil. By 1186, Byzantine possessions in Upper Dalmatia were overrun by Stefan Nemanja, who also imposed his rule over Duklja. The domain of Prince Mihailo was reduced to the coastal regions around Bar, while the rule over Duklja was given to Vukan, eldest son of Stefan Nemanja. Prince Mihailo was patron of the Archbishopric of Bar, and in 1189 his wife, princess Desislava, was accompanied to Dubrovnik by archbishop Gregory of Bar.

== See also ==
- Stefan Nemanja
- Nemanjić dynasty
- Grand Principality of Serbia

== Sources ==
- Ćirković, Sima (2004). The Serbs. Malden: Blackwell Publishing. ISBN 9781405142915.
- Fine, John Van Antwerp Jr. (1991) [1983]. The Early Medieval Balkans: A Critical Survey from the Sixth to the Late Twelfth Century. Ann Arbor, Michigan: University of Michigan Press. ISBN 0472081497.

Regnal titles
Preceded by Desa (Duke of Zahumlje and Travunija)	Prince of Duklja c. 1180–1186	Succeeded by Desislava
