= Dobroslav II =

Ruler of Duklja

Dobroslav
- "King of Slavs" (titular)

King of Duklja
- Reign: 1101–1102
- Predecessor: Constantine Bodin (Mihailo II)
- Successor: Kočopar
- Born: c. 1056
- Died: after 1103
- Burial: Monastery of Saints Sergius and Bacchus, Bojana
- Dynasty: Vojislavljević
- Father: Mihailo Vojislavljević
- Mother: Neda Monomachou
- Religion: Eastern Orthodox Christian

Dobroslav II (Serbian Cyrillic: Доброслав; fl. 1081–1103) was King of Duklja, between 1101 and 1102.

== Life ==
His life is only known from the information given in the Chronicle of the Priest of Duklja, according to which he is sometimes called Dobroslav II in modern historiography. Dobroslav was the eldest of four sons of the Dioclean king Michael I and his second wife, a Greek. Dobroslav was about 25 years old at the death of his father, in c. 1081.

Duklja and neighbouring polities in the late 11th century.

Although being the eldest son, Michael had chosen his favourite, Constantine Bodin, to succeed him. The Venetians had rescued Bodin in 1078 from Byzantine captivity. By 1085, Bodin and his brothers had suppressed a revolt by their cousins, the sons of Michael's brother Radoslav in the župa of Zeta, and Constantine Bodin ruled unchallenged until his death in 1101. Dobroslav succeeded as titular "King of Slavs".

According to the Chronicle of Duklja, Dobroslav was selected by the people to become king after the death of Bodin. However, his reign was short as Vukan, Grand Prince of Serbia, along with the pretender to the Dioclean throne, Kočopar, attacked Duklja, defeating Dobroslav at the Battle of Morača. Dobroslav was overthrown and was banished to inner Serbia. In the meantime, the army from inner Serbia, along with Kočopar and Vukan, took over Dioclea. Kočopar wasn't able to hold his position in Dioclea, and thus escaped to Zachumlia, where he died. Vladimir, Dobroslav's nephew, assumed the throne of Dioclea after Kočopar's death. Dobroslav was later released from prison in inner Serbia and returned to Dioclea. However, upon his arrival, Vladimir imprisoned him in Scutari where he was blinded and castrated on the orders of Bodin's widow, Queen Jaquinta. His last years were spent at the Monastery of Saints Sergius and Bacchus (Sv. Srđa i Vakha) on the Bojana river, where he was buried. He had no issue.

== See also ==
- Vojislavljević dynasty
- Vukanović dynasty

Regnal titles
Preceded by Constantine Bodin	King of Duklja; 1101–1102	Succeeded by Župan; Kočapar
