= Duklja =

Medieval state in Southeastern Europe

Kingdom of Duklja Дукља (Serbian) Duklja (Serbian)
- 10th century–1186/9
- Kingdom of Duklja (Dioclea) in 1089
- Capital: Bar; Shkodër
- Common languages: Old Serbian
- Religion: Christianity
- Government: Monarchy
- Prince/King
  - 10th century: Petar (first known)
  - 1046 – 1081: Mihailo I (first king)
  - fl. 1180 – 1186: Mihailo III (last independent)
- History
  - Established: 10th century
  - Elevated to the status of kingdom: 1077
  - Conquered by Grand Principality of Serbia: 1186/9
| Preceded by | Succeeded by |
| Byzantine Empire | Grand Principality of Serbia |
- Today part of: Albania; Bosnia and Herzegovina; Croatia; Montenegro; Serbia

Duklja (Serbian Cyrillic: Дукља; Greek: Διόκλεια, romanized: Diókleia; Latin: Dioclea) was a medieval South Slavic state which roughly encompassed the territories of modern-day southeastern Montenegro, from the Bay of Kotor in the west to the Bojana river in the east, and to the sources of the Zeta and Morača rivers in the north. First mentioned in 10th– and 11th-century Byzantine chronicles, it was a vassal of the Bulgarian Empire between 997 and 1018, and then of the Byzantine Empire until it became independent in 1040 under Stefan Vojislav (fl. 1034–43) who rose up and managed to take over territories of the earlier Serbian Principality, founding the Vojislavljević dynasty. Between 1043 and 1080, under Mihailo Vojislavljević (r. 1050–81), and his son, Constantine Bodin (r. 1081–1101), Duklja saw its apogee. Mihailo was given the nominal title King of Slavs by the Pope after having left the Byzantine camp and supported an uprising in the Balkans, in which his son Bodin played a central part. Having incorporated the Serbian hinterland (known as Grand Principality of Serbia, and anachronistically as Raška) and installed vassal rulers there, this maritime principality emerged as the most powerful Serb polity, seen in the titles used by its rulers ("Prince of Serbia", "of Serbs"). However, its rise was short-lived, as Bodin was defeated by the Byzantines and imprisoned; pushed to the background, his relative and vassal Vukan became independent in Raška, which continued the fight against the Byzantines while Duklja was struck with civil wars. Between 1113 and 1149 Duklja was the centre of Serbian–Byzantine conflict, with members of the Vojislavljević as protégés of either fighting each other for power. Duklja was then incorporated as a crown land of the Grand Principality of Serbia ruled by the Vukanović dynasty, subsequently known as Zeta, remaining so until the fall of the Serbian Empire in the 14th century.

== Etymology ==
In historiography, Konstantin Jireček was the first to use the name "Duklja". Doclea was originally the name of the Roman city on the site of modern Podgorica (Ribnica), built by Roman Emperor Diocletian, who hailed from this region of Roman Dalmatia. The Romanized Illyrian tribe known as Docleatae that inhabited the area derived their name from the city. In later centuries, the Romans hypercorrected the name to Dioclea, wrongly guessing that an i had been lost due to vulgar speech patterns. Duklja is the later Slavic version of the name of this region, attributed to the principality under Byzantine suzerainty ("Diokleia", Διόκλεια). The demonym, or tribal name, appearing in De Administrando Imperio was "Dioklētianoí" (Διοκλητιανοί).

== Geography ==
According to De Administrando Imperio (948–952), in chapter 35, Diókleia (Διόκλεια) included the "large, inhabited cities" of Gradetai, Nougrade, and Lontodokla. Gradetai may have been Starigrad, Nougrade may have been Prevlaka, while the location of Lontodokla is uncertain.

According to the later, somewhat dubious source, Chronicle of the Priest of Duklja, a ruler named Hvalimir who was alleged to be an ancestor of Jovan Vladimir (ca. 990–1016), held Zeta and its towns, and the following counties: Lusca (Luška), Podlugiae (Podlužje), Gorsca (Gorska), Cupelnich (Kupelnik), Obliquus (Oblik), Prapratna, Cermeniza (Crmnica) and Budua (Budva) with Cuceva (Kučevo) and Gripuli (Grbalj).

Since the 12th century, the term Zeta began to replace the name Duklja.

== De Administrando Imperio ==
The DAI claims that Duklja had been made desolate by the Avars and "repopulated in the time of the Emperor Heraclius, just as were Croatia and Serbia" (i.e. in the first half of the 7th century), by Slavs. While he clearly states that the neighbouring principalities of Serbia, Pagania, Zahumlje, Travunia and Kanalites had been settled by the 'unbaptized Serbs', he mentions Duklja simply as having been settled by 'Slavs'. The statements of various Byzantine writers in which the Diocleans are also called as Serbs, Croats, and Dalmati do not allow equalization of Duklja inhabitants until 12th century either with the Serbs or with the Croats. Scholars have debated at length as to the reliability of DAI. For example, Francis Dvornik and Florin Curta, among others, suggested that the DAI was a political document, rather than a strictly historical one and that it probably indicates that the coastal županijas were under the authority of the Serbian prince, Časlav Klonimirović, in the mid-10th century. Tibor Živković, Neven Budak and Hrvoje Gračanin also concluded that a closer reading suggests that Constantine consideration about regional ethnic identity is based on Serbian political rule and expansion in the 10th century which does not necessarily indicate ethnic origin. Relja Novaković also came to a similar conclusion. John V.A. Fine argues "given that Serbs settled in regions along its borders, presumably this would have also been a Serb region". Ivo Banac proposed that the DAI mention that a part of the Croats "split off and took control of Illyricum and Pannonia" after settling western part of the province of Dalmatia could be connected to Duklja, while Chronicle of the Priest of Duklja calls that area as Red Croatia. According to historian Sima Ćirković, although Constantine VII does not mention tribes of whom peoples of Duklja originate, the authors of the XI century considered rulers of Zeta to be Serbs and sometimes call their land Serbia. Ćirković also considers that this narrow scientific question has been politicized by opposing Diocleans to Serbs and ignoring historical sources from 11th and 12th century. The dubious Chronicle of the Priest of Duklja, compiled in 1298–1301 by a Cistercian monk in the service of Paul I Šubić of Bribir, nevertheless if does again promote mere Byzantine confusion over Serbs and Croats, with other historical sources does allude to the existence of Croats and their political influence far into Montenegrin inland until the late 12th century.

Ultimately, the origins of Duklja are not known with certainty, for the literary evidence often rests on semi-legendary genealogies. Moreover, what actually constituted a people (gens) in the Middle Ages has been rigorously debated. There is no clear evidence that peoples known as Serbs or Croats migrated en masse as coherent nations able to resettle large territories, and that arrived as small military elites which assimilated and organized other already settled Slavs. Both Florin Curta and John Fine, among other medievalists, have argued that ethnonyms such as Serb or Croat were primarily political labels referring to a dux and his retinue of nobles as well as military elite, while on a lower level it also referred the mass of commoners who inhabited the territory under the often nominal and transient rule of such leaders. There is little evidence that a modern notion of nation-type ethnicity, and the values associated with it, existed in medieval societies. Rather, some sort of group identity began to form within the Balkans from the late 7th century as Slavic notables formed a system of alliances. This coincides with the final demise of Avar hegemony over the western Balkans. At the same time, the Byzantines had begun to re-establish some control in parts of the Balkans after the 7th-century collapse of imperial control. The establishment of the Byzantine theme of Dyrrhachium facilitated diplomatic contacts between the East Romans and the Adriatic Sclaviniae.

Rather, for the general masses, identity was rooted primarily with one's own clan, village and region. As Fine states, "In this large region settled by Slavs, all of whom spoke the same language, certain political entities emerged, and that is all that they were, political entities". Duklja was one such polity, and its subsequent history was closely intertwined with that of Serbia/Rascia and the Byzantine Empire, and as well as Rome and 'western' powers. As such Duklja is seen as one of the medieval Serb states and was the political and cultural predecessor of modern Montenegro.

== Early history ==
Little is known about Duklja prior to the 11th century. The main source on the history of early South Slavic states is De Administrando Imperio by Emperor Constantine VII (compiled before 952). The work mentions virtually nothing about Duklja apart from that it was settled by Slavs and was ruled by the Byzantine Emperors. It probably did not exist as an established, independent polity before the late 10th century. The Byzantines ruled over coastal cities such as Doclea, Bar, Kotor, and the hinterland surrounding these. Archaeological evidence (a personal seal belonging to "Peter of Diokleia") suggests that local officials governed this small region in the name of the Emperor. The Slav regions that were not directly under Byzantine rule (such as Travunia) were organized into numerous župa, (roughly, a county) ruled by local families.

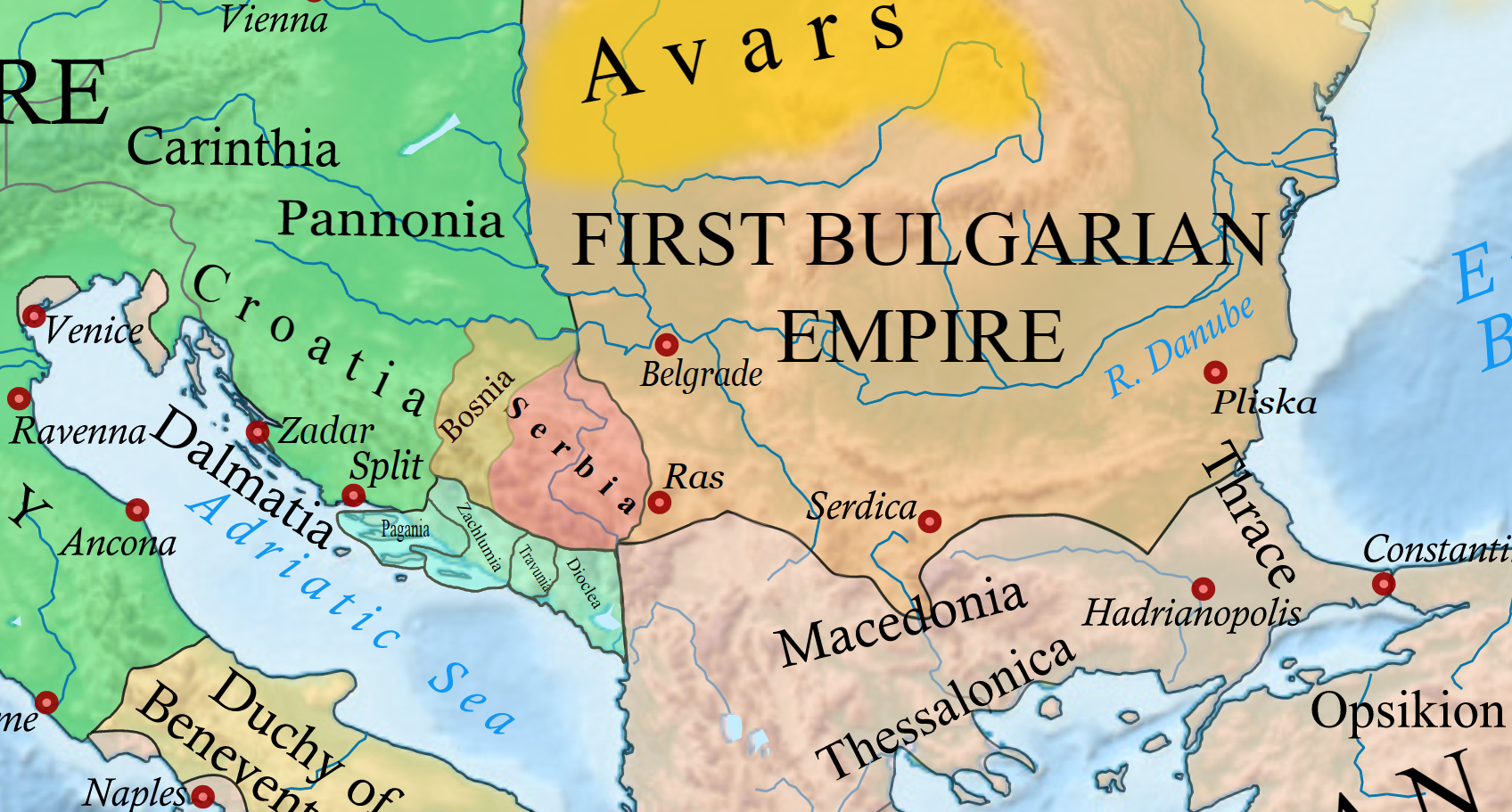
Adriatic Slavic principalities in ca. 814 AD.

Slav raids on Eastern Roman territory are mentioned in 518, and by the 580s they had conquered large areas referred to as Sclavinia ("Slavdom", from Sklavenoi). Duklja was settled by Slavs predominantly during the 7th century, although the area was subject to raids by Avars and Slavs from the 6th century. Being a mountainous region, it perhaps served as an area of refuge for pre-Slavic populations. According to Noel Malcolm, today's western Serbia was area where Serbs settled in 7th century and from there they expanded their rule on territory of Duklja. Prince Višeslav (fl. 768–814), the first known Serbian monarch by name, ruled the hereditary lands (Županias, "counties") of Neretva, Tara, Piva, Lim. He managed to unite several more provinces and tribes into what would become the Serbian Principality. Višeslav was succeeded by his son Radoslav and then Prosigoj, during that time the Serbs were people "who are said to hold a great/large part of Dalmatia" (ad Sorabos, quae natio magnam Dalmatiae partem obtinere dicitur, Royal Frankish Annals, 822), but according to John (Jr.) Fine, it was hard to find Serbs in this area since the Byzantine sources were limited to the southern coast, but it is possible that among other tribes existed a tribe or group of small tribes of Serbs. Prince Vlastimir further united Serbian tribes against the growing threat from the Bulgarian Empire, his realm spanned over southwestern Serbia, much of Montenegro, eastern Herzegovina and southeastern Bosnia. Prince Petar Gojniković expanded along the Neretva, annexing the Narentines, where he seems to have come into conflict with Michael Višević, a Bulgarian ally and the ruler of Zahumlje (with Trebinje and most of what would later be Duklja). Michael Višević heard of the possible alliance between Serbia and the Byzantines, and warned Symeon. Symeon defeats Petar and in the following years there is a power struggle between the Bulgars and Byzantines over Serbian overlordship. Prince Časlav ruled over a confederacy of tribes covering an expansive area. Some consider he took over regions previously held by Michael, who disappears from sources in 925.

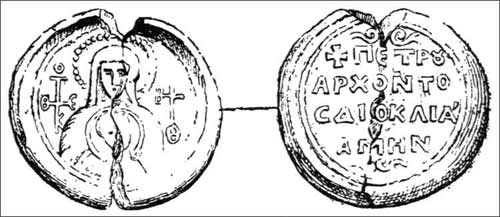
Lead stamp of archont Petar (or Predimir) (9th century), a Byzantine viceroy; The Holy Virgin Mary with the Christ Child (left) and inscription in Greek "+ Petar archont of Dioklia AMIN" (right).

After Časlav died in ca. 960, Stari Ras and probably also Serbian lands were annexed by the Byzantines who formed Catepanate of Ras. A Peter, whose seal has been found, was the archon Diokleias probably at the turn of the 11th century. A Serbian diplomatic mission, likely sent from Duklja, arrived at the Byzantine capital of Constantinople and was recorded in a charter of the Great Lavra Monastery, written in 993. In the 11th century, Jovan Vladimir ruled Duklja, with his court centered in Bar on the Adriatic coast; he held much of the Pomorje under his control including Travunija and Zachlumia. His realm may have stretched west- and northwards to include some parts of the Zagorje (inland Serbia and Bosnia) as well. Vladimir's pre-eminent position over other Slavic nobles in the area explains why Emperor Basil approached him for an anti-Bulgarian alliance. With his hands tied by war in Anatolia, Basil required allies for his war against Tsar Samuel, who ruled the Bulgarian empire stretching over Northern Bulgaria, Western Bulgaria, Macedonia, Serbia, Raška and Epirus. Samuel invaded Duklja in 997, and pushed through Dalmatia up to the city of Zadar, incorporating Bosnia and Serbia into his realm. After defeating Vladimir, Samuel reinstated him as a vassal Prince. We do not know what Vladimir's connection was to the previous Serbian dynasty as much of what is written in the Chronicles of the Priest of Duklja about the genealogy of the Doclean rulers is mythological. Vladimir was murdered by Vladislav, Samuel's brother and successor, circa 1016 AD. The last prominent member of his family, his uncle Dragimir, was killed by some local citizens in Kotor in 1018. That same year, the Byzantines had defeated the Bulgarians, and in one masterful stroke re-took virtually the entire Balkans.

== Rise ==
The Byzantine victory over the Bulgarians was a critical development in Balkan history. The Byzantines ruled most of the Balkans – Bulgaria, Serbia, Duklja, and Bosnia all fell back under Byzantine rule for the first time since the 6th century. Over much of the 11th century, we hear very little about events from the interior. Central Serbia was probably under the jurisdiction of the strategos (governor) of Sirmium – Constantine Diogenes. Some historians suggest that Duklja was ruled directly by the strategos of Dyrrhachium, while others posit that a native prince (whose name has not survived) was allowed to remain, ruling as a Byzantine vassal. Either way, the Slavic nobility was under Byzantine control.

Short-lived as it was, Vladimir's influence in Balkan politics shifted the centre of Serbian rule from inland Serbia to the coast. This was a "renewed Serbian state centered on Duklja".

In the 1030s, as Skylitzes and Kekaumenos have written, Stefan Vojislav, who held the title of "archont, and toparch of the kastra of Dalmatia, Zeta and Ston", led the "Serbs who renounced Byzantine rule". According to the CPD, he was a nephew of Vladimir. In 1034, he took "Duklja" while the Byzantines were switching thrones. The Byzantines retaliated by sending in troops from Dyrrhachium and captured Vojislav, who was taken prisoner to Constantinople. He managed to escape and began a guerrilla resistance from Duklja's mountains. He defeated several Byzantine expeditions and liberated most of Duklja. A Slav rebellion centered on Belgrade, organised by Peter Delian in the late 1030s, worked in Vojislav's favour by diverting attention from Duklja. He used this to assert rule from his capital in Scutari, and extended his rule from Duklja to Travunia and a part of Zachlumia. He besieged the Byzantine city of Dyrrhachium and held the lands surrounding it.

In 1042, another Byzantine attack was defeated. The Byzantines had sent a "coalition" of vassal Slavic chiefs to fight Voislav. The coalition consisted of the Župan of Bosnia, Knez (Prince) Ljutovid of Zachlumia and the Župan of Raska. Fine suggests that under Byzantine dominance, "Rascia" had in the 1040s emerged as yet another Serbian state (roughly centered on what is now southern Serbia and Kosovo. Vojislav won a great victory against his attackers. He overthrew ljutovid and placed the region entirely under his control. Duklja was undoubtedly the leading Slavic state. Vojislav probably died in 1043. Of his 5 sons, Mihailo (Michael) eventually secured rule by 1046. He was an apt diplomat, he fostered good relations with the Byzantines by marrying one of the Emperor's relatives, earning himself the title protostrator. He also entered diplomatic relations with the western powers by marrying one of his sons, Constantine Bodin, to the daughter of the Norman governor of Bari. Michael conquered Rascia from the Byzantines in the 1060s and assigned one of his sons, Petrislav as ruler. In 1072, he supported another Slav rebellion in Macedonia by sending a force led by his son Constantine Bodin. After initial success, The Chronicle of the Priest of Duklja claims that Bodin was proclaimed Tsar Peter III of Bulgaria. A Byzantine retaliation, however, resulted in Bodin's capture, only to be freed by Venetian mercenaries hired by his father.

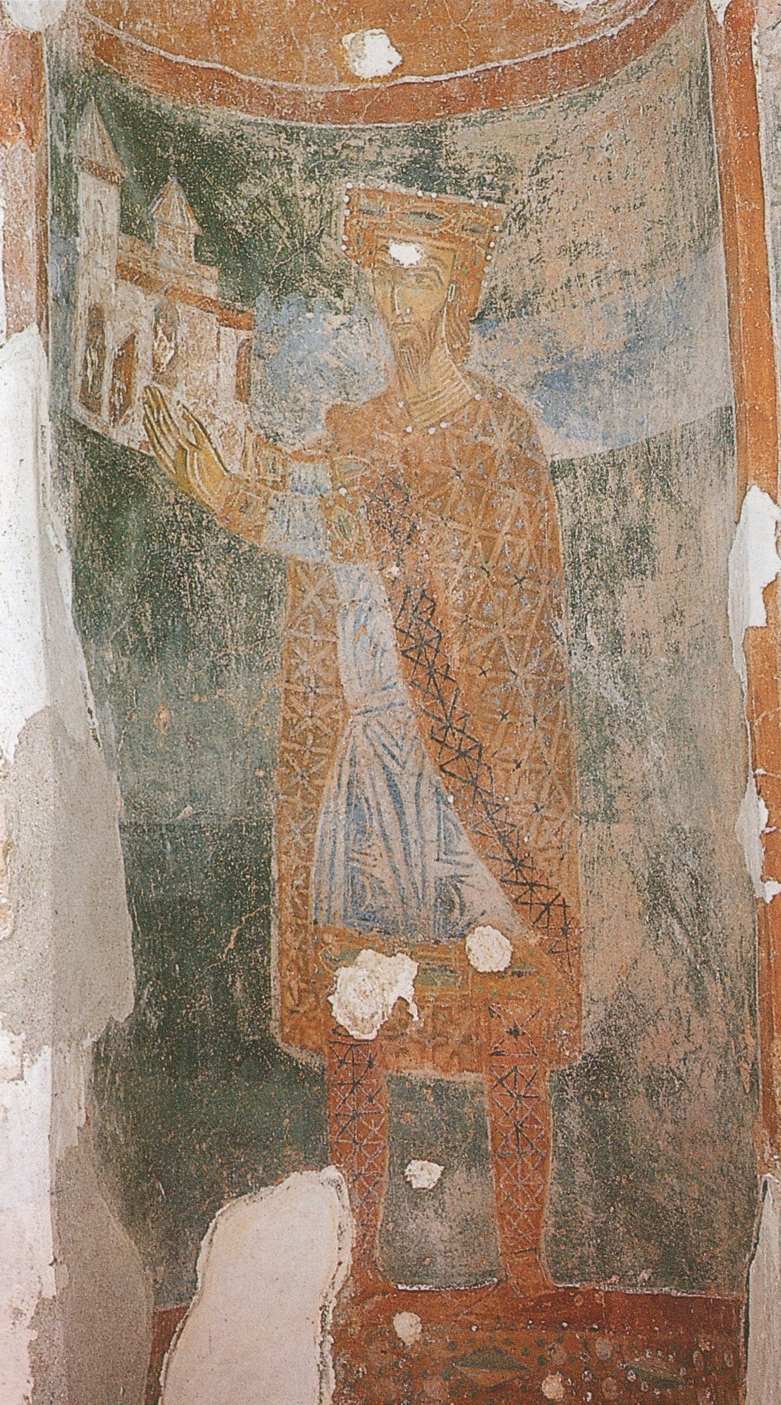
Mihailo I of Duklja, the first recognized ruler of Duklja on a fresco in the Church of St. Michael in Ston: He was crowned King of Slavs and known as Ruler of Serbs and Tribals.

At some point during his rule, Michael acquired the title of King. Most scholars place this date to 1077, when he received a legate from the Pope referring to him as the King of Slavs. However, Curta suggests that Michael may have been King as early as 1053, since he proclaimed himself 'King' sometime after receiving the protostrator title from the Emperor. However, formal recognition as King in medieval Europe required acknowledgement either from the Pope or the Byzantine Emperor. Either way, he was King by 1077.

When Michael died in 1081, he was succeeded by his son Constantine Bodin. The Normans attacked southern Dalmatia, capturing Dyrrhachium and Ragusa. Bodin was expected to aid the Emperor at Dyrrhachium, instead he remained idle (possibly as part of a pre-conceived plan with the Normans) and watched the Byzantines get utterly defeated. During his early rule, energy spent consolidating his rule and meddling with Byzantine-Norman matters diverted Bodin's attention from other parts of his realm. The "Chronicle of the Priest of Duklja" notes that Bodin sent expedition into Bosnia and Rascia. Since his father, Michael, had already captured Raska earlier, it must have slipped out of Duklja's control. Bodin successfully marched against Raska and placed his cousins Vukan and Marko (the sons of Petrislav) as župans. He also captured Bosnia, and placed one of his courtiers, Stipan, to rule in his name. Although Bodin was recognised as 'King of Duklja and Dalmatia, there is no evidence to suggest that Bosnia, Zachlumia, Duklja and Rascia were incorporated into an integrated kingdom. Each region retained its own hereditary nobility, but were under the political and military sway of Duklja. By 1085 the Byzantines got the upper hand in their wars with the Normans, recapturing Dyrrachium and Ragusa. In 1090, they punished Bodin for his impudence, possibly capturing him for the second time, and not much is known about him subsequently until he dies in c. 1101. Raska, Zahumlje and Bosnia probably broke free from Dukljan vassalage.

In the 10th century, following the Synod of Split, Split gained jurisdiction over much of the Dalmatian coast, except southern regions (including most of Duklja), which were under the Archbisphopric of Dyrrhachium. However, Split's pre-eminent position was soon challenged by other cities vying for metropolinate status – Bar and Dubrovnik (Ragusa). The East-West Schism would soon have a great impact upon Serbia, not only religiously, but also politically. Since Serbia was positioned at the border zone between Roman and Constantinopolitan jurisdiction, Serb rulers tried to exploit this rivalry to their advantage. The Slavs who lived along the southern Dalmatian coast fell under the religious jurisdiction of Rome, via the Archbishops of Split, Bar and Ragusa. The rest, in the hinterland stretching to Serbia, were under the Patriarch of Constantinople via the Archbishops of Ohrid, Sirmium and Dyrrhachium. King Mihailo's prerogative was to establish an autocephalous Slavic Church – an independent state requires an independent church. For political reasons, he turned to Rome, since at the time he was in less than amicable relations with Byzantium. Michael presumed that the Pope would jump at the chance to expand his jurisdiction in southern Dalmatia, but Michael's wish was not easily forthcoming. Although some studies have stated that his request to raise Bar to an Archbishopric was granted in 1067, it seems that the cited bull is not authentic. In 1089, Constantine Bodin managed to raise the bishopric of Bar to an Archbishopric, by supporting the pope against an antipope. The suffragan bishops were to be: Kotor, Ulcinj, Svač, Skadar, Drivast, Pula, Ras, Bosnia and Trebinje. In obtaining its promotion, it acquired a much larger diocese, including territory that earlier had not been under the pope – territories of the metropolitan of Durazzo and Archbishop of Ochrid, two sees that recognized the jurisdiction of the Ecumenical Patriarchate of Constantinople. The Bar Archbishopric's new territory were merely theoretical – the pope's edict could only affect the churches that recognized Rome. Making Rascia a suffragan to Bar had little meaning, as most of its churches were under Constantinople, and there is no evidence of Vukan changing adherence to Rome. Durazzo and Ochrid may have suffered minimal territorial losses along the coast, Duklja was briefly a subject to Rome, however inland Duklja was not affected, and along with much of Duklja's coast (like most of Kotor) was to retain its loyalty to Orthodoxy.

== Decline ==
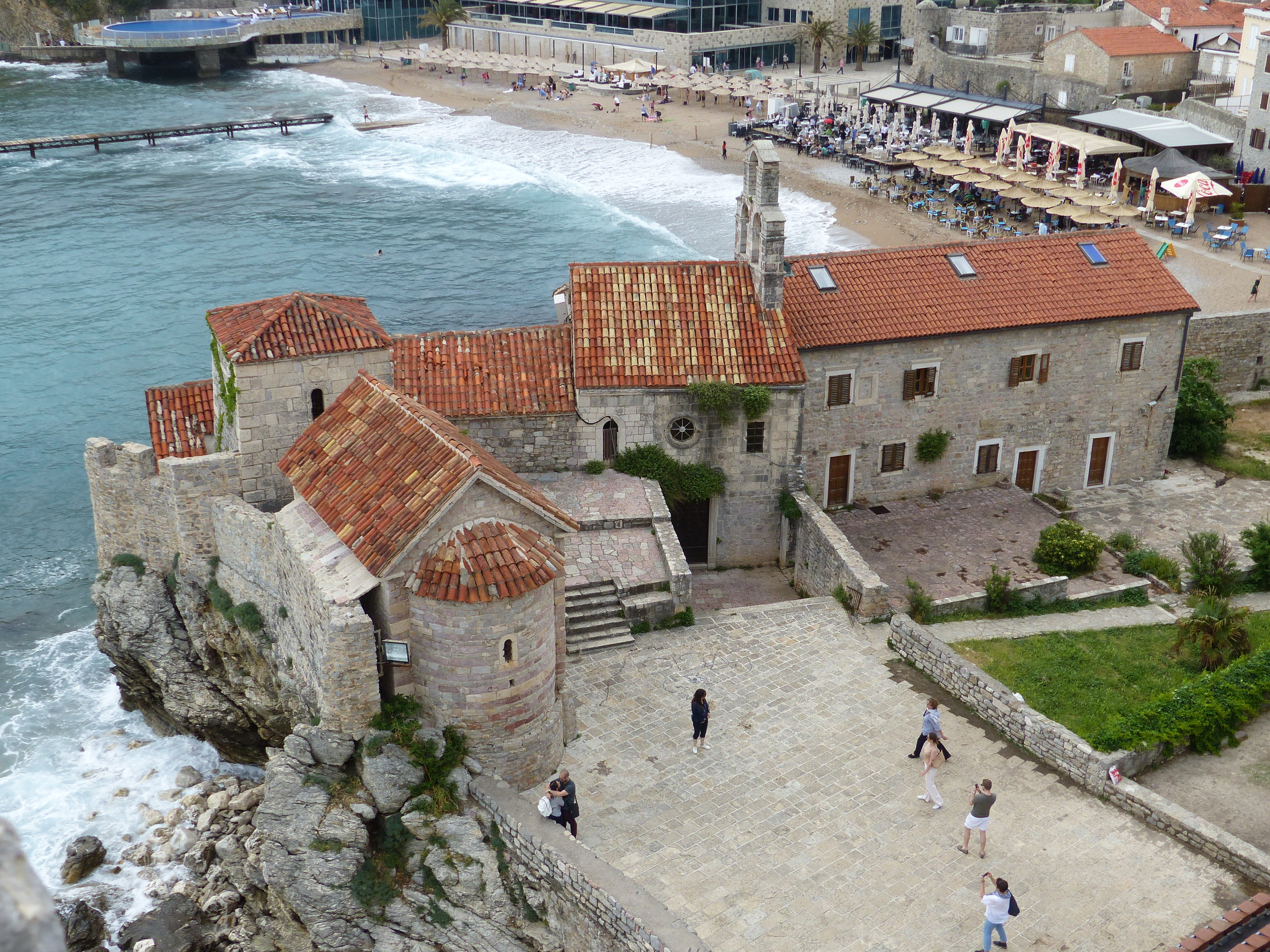
The church of St. Savas in Budva, consecrated in 1142

With Bodin gone, his Norman wife, Jaquinta, feared that Bodin's nephew, Branislav, would try to seize power before her young children could take the throne. She ordered the arrest of Branislav and his family and Branislav died in captivity, while his other 6 brothers and sons found asylum in Ragusa. Thus in the haste to claim the throne, seeds of family hatred were planted among the extended family. After Bodin died, his half-brother Dobroslav II gained the throne of Duklja. Seeing a weak Duklja, the Byzantines started to meddle, sending Kočopar, one of Branislav's exiled brothers to capture the throne. He managed to get assistance from Vukan of Raška, and together they beat Dobroslav. However, there was a falling out between Kočopar and Vukan. Vukan drove out Kočopar, who then died in exile. The Doclean nobles then elected a Vladimir, yet another relative, who ruled in peace as a Byzantine vassal. But Jaquinta had not given up. After Vladimir died, she had Dobroslav II (who was still in jail) castrated and blinded in case he were to gain the throne, thus securing the throne for her son Đurađ (George), c. 1114–18. She had gained support from an anti-Byzantine faction of nobles. Branislav's family again fled to Byzantine safety, this time in Dyrrhachium. There they gained support from the Byzantines, who ousted Đurađ and imprisoned Jaquinta. Grubeša, one of Branislav's sons, was placed on the throne in 1118. He ruled peacefully until 1125. Đurađ had fled to Rascia, and secured the support of the new Rascian Grand Župan, Uroš, believed to be the nephew of Vukan. Uroš was aligned with the Hungarians, and was anti-Byzantine. He invaded Duklja and placed Đurađ back on the throne. Yet another Byzantine intervention ousted Đurađ for the second time, capturing him, and he died in captivity. Gradinja, one of Grubeša's brothers was then placed as King, the last ruler to hold such a title in Duklja. He died a natural death in 1146, and was succeeded by his son Radoslav. Radoslav only bore the title Knez (Prince).

Duklja's long internecine strife was devastating for its status, as it was reduced back to a Principality dependent on Byzantine support, and was increasingly losing territory to Raska. By the time of Radoslav's reign as prince, he only held a small strip of land on the Dukljan coast (From Kotor to Ulcinj). By 1166, much of Duklja was occupied by Rascia, and in 1186, Stefan Nemanja annexed Duklja in its entirety after defeating the last Doclean prince – Mihailo.

Princess Desislava, according to Professor Božidar Šekularac, was the last ruler of Duklja.

== List of rulers ==
- Petar, archon of Diokleia, 10th century
- St. Jovan Vladimir, c. 1000 – 22 May 1016
- Stefan Vojislav, archon, and toparches of the kastra of Dalmatia, Zeta and Ston, 1018 – c. 1043
- Neda (female)
- Mihailo I rex Sclavorum (King of Slavs), c. 1046 – 1081 (King in c. 1077)
- King Constantine Bodin of Duklja and Serbia 1081–1101
- King Mihailo II of Duklja 1101–1102
- King Dobroslav II of Duklja 1101–1102
- King Kočopar of Duklja 1102–1103
- King Vladimir of Duklja 1103–1113
- King George I of Duklja 1113–1118
- Prince Grubeša of Duklja and Antivari 1118–1125
- King George I of Duklja 1125–1131 (reinstated)
- King Gradihna 1131–1142 or 1135–1146
- Prince Radoslav 1146–1149
- Prince Mihailo III 1180–1186
- Princess Desislava (female) 1186–1189 (disputed)

The principality then came under the rule of the Nemanjić dynasty, through the branch of Vukan Nemanjić of Duklja, and his son George II of Duklja. At times, a royal title including "Duklja" was adopted, however, "of the Maritime lands" was mostly used throughout the Middle Ages.

== See also ==
- Zeta (crown land)
- Doclean Academy of Sciences and Arts

== Notes ==
1. Duklja was one of the "Serbian principalities" of the High Middle Ages. The 11th-century chronicles state that the people of what is known in historiography as Duklja (the polity was variously called "Serbia", "Dalmatia", etc) were "Serbs" (Σέρβος) or "Croats". The rulers were titled, among others, "Prince of Serbs/Serbia":
  - According to George Kedrenos (fl. 1050s), Stefan Vojislav was the "Prince of Serbia", while according to John Skylitzes (fl. 1057–59), the "Prince of the Serbs" (ὁ τῶν Σέρβων ἄρχων).
  - According to Kedrenos and Skylitzes, Mihailo Vojislavljević was the "Prince of Tribali and Serbs" (Τριβαλλών και Σέρβων...αρχηγός/ Τριβαλλῶν καὶ Σέρβων...ἀρχηγός)
  - According to Skylitzes, "In the first year of the reign of Michael, the 11th indiction, the Serbian people, also called the Croats, set out to enslave Bulgaria"
  - According to Nikephoros Bryennios, "the tribe of Slavs rejected the Romans' yoke and ravaged and plundered Bulgaria; Skopje and Niš were also looted; Sirmium and the lands lying around the Sava River and the towns along the Ister near Vidin were in a state of emergency. And then Croats and Diocleans revolted and ravaged all of Illyricum"
  - According to Joannes Zonaras, "In the third year of his reign [that of Michael VII Doukas], the tribe of Croats, who some people also call Serbs, moved and tried to take the land of the Bulgarians"

== Sources ==
Primary sources

- Moravcsik, Gyula, ed. (1967) [1949]. Constantine Porphyrogenitus: De Administrando Imperio (2nd revised ed.). Washington D.C.: Dumbarton Oaks Center for Byzantine Studies. ISBN 9780884020219.
- Parthey, Gustav (1866). Hieroclis Synecdemus et notitiae Graecae episcopatuum: Accedunt Nili Doxapatrii notitia patriarchatuum et locorum nomina immutata. Berolini: In aedibus Friderici Nicolai.
- Pertz, Georg Heinrich, ed. (1845). Einhardi Annales. Hanover.
- Scholz, Bernhard Walter, ed. (1970). Carolingian Chronicles: Royal Frankish Annals and Nithard's Histories. University of Michigan Press. ISBN 0472061860.
- Thurn, Hans, ed. (1973). Ioannis Scylitzae Synopsis historiarum. Berlin-New York: De Gruyter. ISBN 9783110022858.
- Шишић, Фердо, ed. (1928). Летопис Попа Дукљанина (Chronicle of the Priest of Duklja). Београд-Загреб: Српска краљевска академија.
- Кунчер, Драгана (2009). Gesta Regum Sclavorum. Vol. 1. Београд-Никшић: Историјски институт, Манастир Острог. Archived from the original on 10 August 2020.
- Живковић, Тибор (2009). Gesta Regum Sclavorum. Vol. 2. Београд-Никшић: Историјски институт, Манастир Острог. Archived from the original on 1 May 2019.

Secondary sources

- Ćirković, Sima (2004). The Serbs. Malden: Blackwell Publishing. ISBN 9781405142915.
- Curta, Florin (2006). Southeastern Europe in the Middle Ages, 500–1250. Cambridge: Cambridge University Press. ISBN 9780521815390.
- Dvornik, F.; Jenkins, R. J. H.; Lewis, B.; Moravcsik, Gy.; Obolensky, D.; Runciman, S. (1962). Jenkins, P. J. H. (ed.). De Administrando Imperio: Volume II. Commentary. University of London: The Athlone Press.
- Fine, John V. A. Jr. (1991) [1983]. The Early Medieval Balkans: A Critical Survey from the Sixth to the Late Twelfth Century. Ann Arbor: University of Michigan Press. ISBN 0-472-08149-7.
- Fine, John Van Antwerp Jr. (2006). When Ethnicity Did Not Matter in the Balkans: A Study of Identity in Pre-Nationalist Croatia, Dalmatia, and Slavonia in the Medieval and Early-Modern Periods. Ann Arbor, Michigan: University of Michigan Press. ISBN 0472025600.
- Hupchik, Dennis P. (2002), The Balkans. From Constantinople to Communism, Palgrave MacMillan, ISBN 1-4039-6417-3
- Kalić, Jovanka (2017). "The First Coronation Churches of Medieval Serbia". Balcanica (48): 7–18. doi:10.2298/BALC1748007K. hdl:21.15107/rcub_dais_4886.
- Markovic, Miodrag (2016). On the trail of unique solutions. Serbian art in the 12th century. Byzantine heritage and Serbian Art II. pp. 165–181.
- Samardžić, Radovan; Duškov, Milan, eds. (1993). Serbs in European Civilization. Belgrade: Nova, Serbian Academy of Sciences and Arts, Institute for Balkan Studies. ISBN 9788675830153.
- Stephenson, Paul (2003a). The Legend of Basil the Bulgar-Slayer. Cambridge: Cambridge University Press. ISBN 9780521815307.
- Curta, Florin (2006). Southeastern Europe in the Middle Ages, 500–1250. Cambridge: Cambridge University Press. ISBN 978-0-521-81539-0.
- Runciman, Steven (1988). The Emperor Romanus Lecapenus and His Reign: A Study of Tenth-Century Byzantium. Cambridge University Press. ISBN 9780521357227.
- Stevović, Ivan (2016). "Early Byzantine Doclea and its citizens: Longe ab patriam" (PDF). Niš and Byzantium. 14: 121–136. Archived (PDF) from the original on 19 December 2016.
- Vlasto, Alexis P. (1970). The Entry of the Slavs into Christendom: An Introduction to the Medieval History of the Slavs. Cambridge: Cambridge University Press. ISBN 9780521074599.
- Whittow, Mark (1996). The Making of Byzantium, 600–1025. Berkeley and Los Angeles, California: University of California Press. ISBN 978-0-520-20496-6.
- Живковић, Тибор (2002). Јужни Словени под византијском влашћу 600-1025 (South Slavs under the Byzantine Rule 600-1025). Београд: Историјски институт САНУ, Службени гласник. ISBN 9788677430276.
- Živković, Tibor (2008). Forging unity: The South Slavs between East and West 550-1150. Belgrade: The Institute of History, Čigoja štampa. ISBN 9788675585732.
- Živković, Tibor (2011). "The Origin of the Royal Frankish Annalist's Information about the Serbs in Dalmatia". Homage to Academician Sima Ćirković. Belgrade: The Institute for History. pp. 381–398. ISBN 9788677430917.
- Malcolm, Noel (1995). Povijest Bosne : kratki pregled. Erasmus Gilda : Novi Liber. ISBN 953-6045-03-6. Archived from the original on 6 April 2023.
- Velikonja, Mitja (5 February 2003). Religious Separation and Political Intolerance in Bosnia-Herzegovina. Texas A&M University Press. ISBN 978-1-58544-226-3.
- Sedlar, Jean W. (1994). East Central Europe in the Middle Ages, 1000-1500. University of Washington Press. ISBN 978-0-295-97291-6.
