= Grubeša =

- King of Duklja

King of Duklja
- Reign: 1118–1125
- Predecessor: George
- Successor: George (reinstated)
- Died: 1125
- Burial: Church of St. George, Bar, Montenegro
- Father: Branislav

Grubeša Branislavljević (Serbian Cyrillic: Грубеша Бранислављевић) (died 1125) was a medieval king and the ruler of Duklja from 1118 to 1125. After the Byzantine Empire defeated King George I of Duklja in 1118, Grubeša assumed the throne as a Byzantine protégé. The Byzantines granted Grubeša rule of Duklja, as well as providing him with an army that he would command against George, who was backed by the Grand Principality of Serbia under the rule of the Vukanović dynasty. Grubeša reigned until his death in 1125, when he was defeated by George. He is buried at the Church of Saint George in Bar.

== See also ==
- Vojislavljević dynasty

== Sources ==
- Кунчер, Драгана (2009). Gesta Regum Sclavorum. Vol. 1. Београд-Никшић: Историјски институт, Манастир Острог.
- Живковић, Тибор (2009). Gesta Regum Sclavorum. Vol. 2. Београд-Никшић: Историјски институт, Манастир Острог.
- Živković, Tibor (2008). Forging unity: The South Slavs between East and West 550-1150. Belgrade: The Institute of History, Čigoja štampa. ISBN 9788675585732.

Political offices
Preceded by George	King of Duklja (Byzantine vassal); 1118–1125	Succeeded by George (reinstated)
