= Nemanjić dynasty =

Serbian medieval dynasty

Nemanjić Немањић
- Parent house: Vukanović dynasty
- Country: Serbia: Grand Principality; Kingdom; Empire
- Founded: 1166; 860 years ago
- Founder: Stefan Nemanja
- Final ruler: Stefan Uroš V of Serbia
- Titles: Grand Prince (Veliki Župan / Велики Жупан); King of Serbia (Kralj / Краљ); King of Syrmia; Emperor of the Serbs (Tsar, Car / Цар)
- Estates: Grand Principality of Serbia, Kingdom of Serbia, Doclea-Zeta, Travunia, Dalmatia and Hum
- Dissolution: 1371 as a ruling dynasty (see fall of the Serbian Empire); 1423 (death of the last male descendant, Jovan Uroš)
- Cadet branches: Dejanović noble family (maternally); Lazarević dynasty (maternally); Branković dynasty (maternally)

The House of Nemanjić (Serbian Cyrillic: Немањић, pl. Немањићи; Serbian Latin: Nemanjić, pl. Nemanjići, pronounced [nɛ̌maɲitɕ]) was the most prominent native Serbian dynasty of Serbia in the Middle Ages. This princely, royal and imperial house produced twelve Serbian monarchs, who ruled between 1166 and 1371.

Its progenitor was Stefan Nemanja, scion of a cadet branch of the Vukanović dynasty (1101–1166). After Nemanja, all monarchs used Stefan as a personal name, or a ruler's name, a tradition adopted for the royal pretensions. The monarchs began as Grand Princes, and with the crowning of Stefan Nemanjić in 1217, the realm was promoted to a Kingdom, and the Serbian Orthodox Church was established in 1219. In 1346, Stefan Dušan was crowned Emperor of the Serbs and Greeks, and the Archbishopric of Serbia was elevated to a Patriarchate.

The dynasty's rule in Serbia ended in 1371, with the death of childless Stefan Uroš V (r. 1355–1371). This led to the fall of the Serbian Empire. Provincial lords took control of their provinces. The last remaining members of the House of Nemanjić were John Uroš, ruler of Thessaly, titular emperor of the Serbians and Greeks, who died c. 1422-23, and his younger brother, Stefan Uroš, ruler of Pharsalos. Nemanjić descent survived only through maternal lines in several Serbian houses.

== Background ==
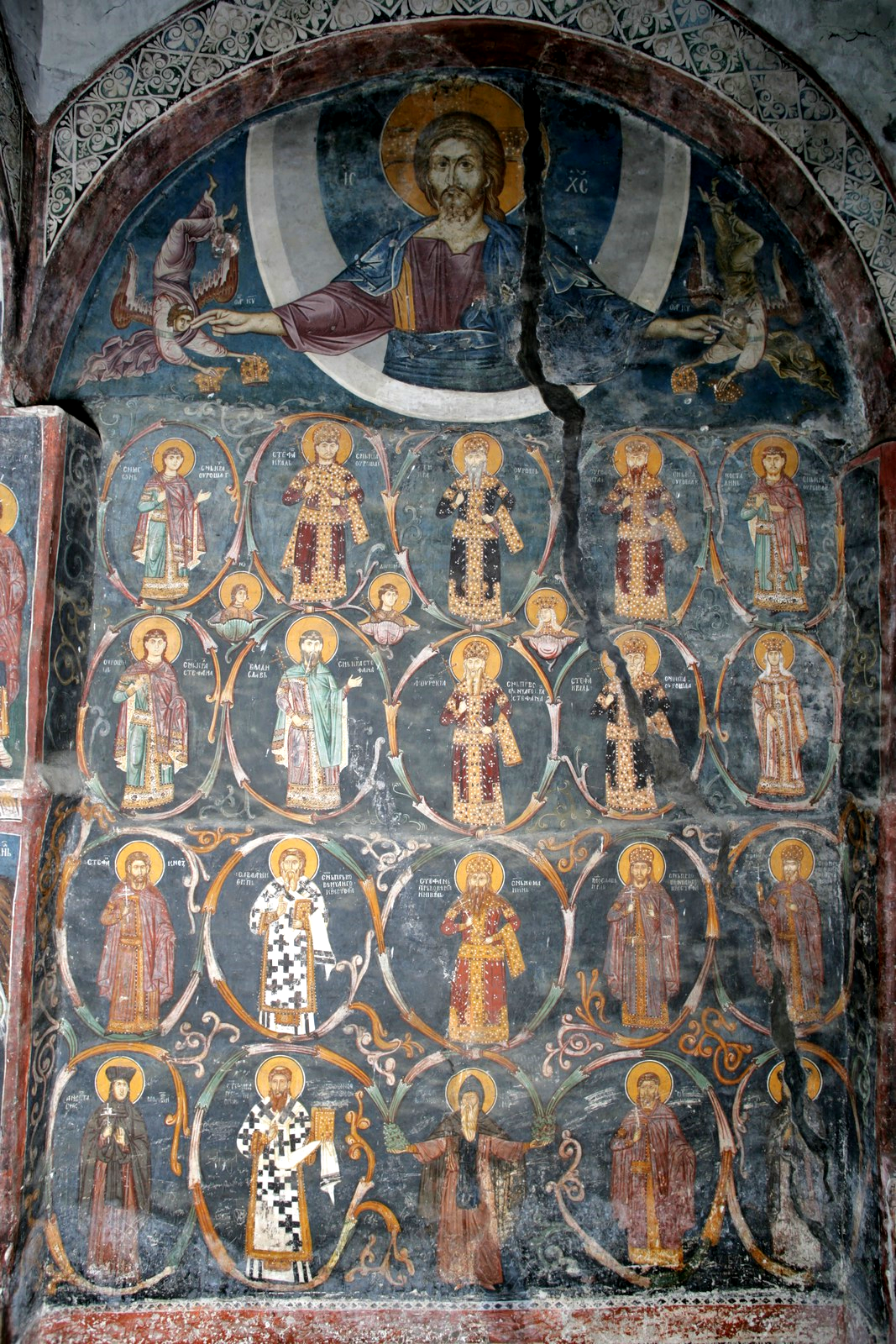
A fresco in depicting the Nemanjić tree from Serbian Orthodox Patriarchate of Peć Monastery

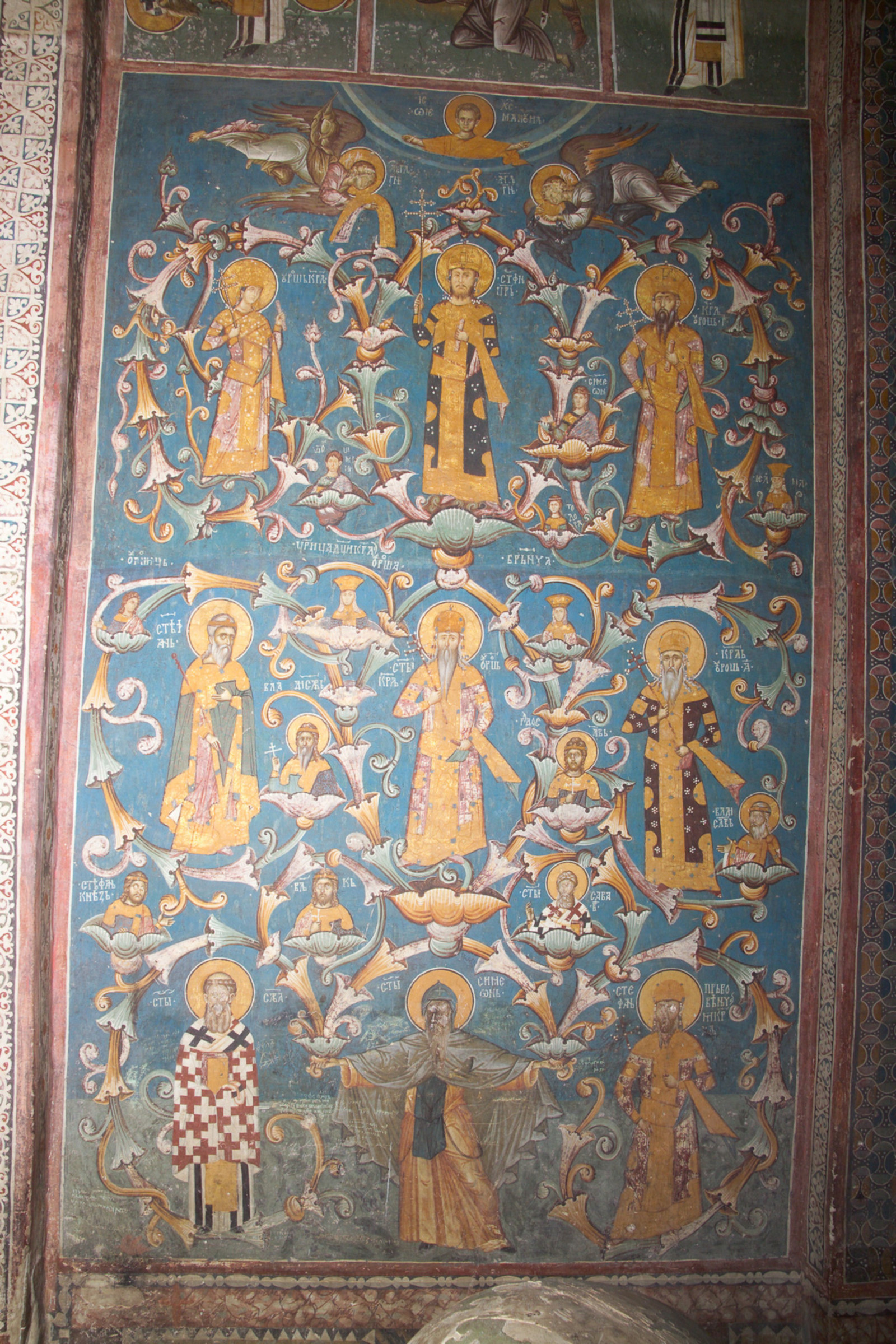
Nemanjić dynasty, 14th century fresco from Serbian Orthodox Visoki Dečani Monastery

In the 8th century, the Vlastimirović dynasty established the Serbian Principality. The state disintegrated after the death of the last known Vlastimirović ruler Časlav of Serbia around 940/960s and the Byzantines annexed the region and held it for a century, until 1040 when the Serbs under the Vojislavljević Dynasty revolted in Duklja (Pomorje). In the 1090s, the Vukanović Dynasty established the Serbian Grand Principality, and since the mid-12th century Stari Ras became undisputably under Serbian control, becoming centre of defence and residency for the Serbian Principality. In 1166, Stefan Nemanja took the throne, marking the beginning of Serbia, henceforth under the rule of the Nemanjići (Vukanović branch).

== Serbia under the Nemanjić dynasty ==
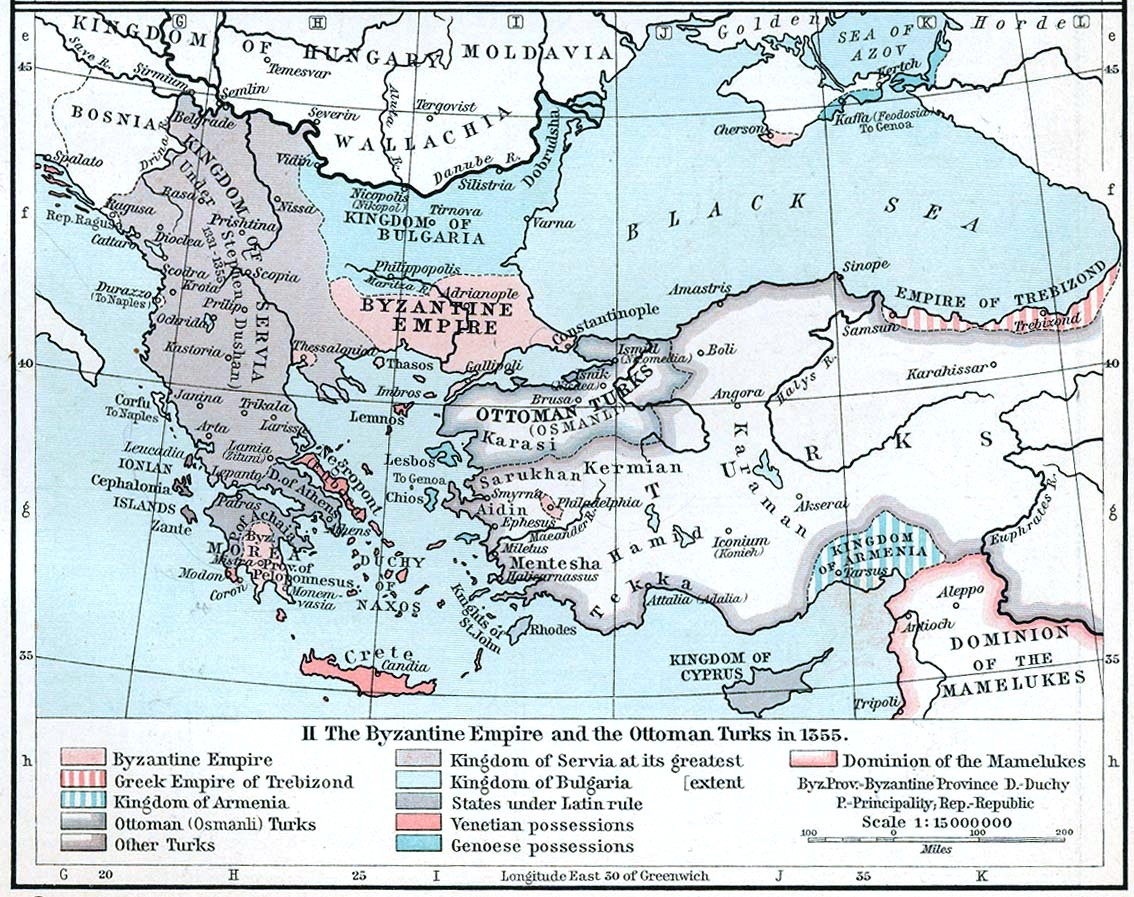
Serbian Empire, 1355

Serbia reached its height of power during the Nemanjić dynasty. The Serbian Kingdom was proclaimed in 1217, leading to the establishment of the Serbian Orthodox Church in 1219. In the same year Saint Sava published the first constitution in Serbia: St. Sava's Nomocanon. Tsar Stefan Dušan proclaimed the Serbian Empire in 1346. During Dušan's rule, Serbia reached its territorial, political, and economical peak, proclaiming itself as the successor of the Byzantine Empire, and was the most powerful Balkan state of that time. Dušan enacted an extensive constitution, known as Dušan's Code, opened new trade routes, strengthened the state's economy, but its society's integration was unfinished and not unified enough until Ottoman invasion. Serbian medieval political identity has been profoundly shaped by the rule of this dynasty and its accomplishments, that were supported and cultivated by the Serbian Orthodox Church.

Stefan Dušan attempted to organize a Crusade with the Pope against the threatening Turks, but he died suddenly in December 1355. He was succeeded by his son Uroš, called the Weak, a term that might also apply to the state of the empire, which slowly slid into a feudal fragmentation. This was a period marked by the rise of a new threat: the Ottoman Turk sultanate, which spread from Asia to Europe conquering Byzantium and then the other states in the Balkans.

== Members ==
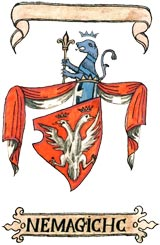
Coat of arms attributed to the Nemanjić dynasty in the Fojnica Armorial, based on the Ohmučević Armorial (late 16th century). The double-headed eagle is attested for the flag of the medieval kingdom of Serbia by Angelino Dulcert (1339).

=== Monarchs ===
The Nemanjić dynasty ruled the Serb lands between ca. 1166 up to 1371.

Picture	^{Title}Name	Reign	Notes
	^{Grand Prince} Stefan Nemanja	1166–1196	Nemanja is the eponymous founder of the Nemanjić dynasty. He re-established control over the neighbouring territories, including Duklja, Hum and Travunia. In his last years, he joined his son Sava and took monastic vows, later recognized as Saint Symeon after numerous alleged miracles following his death. Note: Duklja, Zahumlje and Travunija is reconquered, Nemanja is proclaimed "Grand Prince of All Serbia"
	^{Grand Prince} Vukan	1202–1204	Eldest son of Stefan Nemanja. He held the appanage of "Duklja, Dalmatia (Zahumlje), Travunija, Toplica and Hvosno" as Grand Prince, by 1190. He was the initial heir presumptive, but his father chose Stefan instead upon the abdication in 1196. With the death of Nemanja, Vukan started plotting against his brother. He found help in Hungary, and together they forced Stefan to flee to Bulgaria. He ruled as a Hungarian vassal, evident in Emeric I's title "King of Serbia". He left the throne in 1204, and continued to rule his appanage, he was later pardoned by the third brother Saint Sava.
	^{King ↑Grand Prince} Stefan the First-Crowned	1196–1202; 1204–1228	Second son of Stefan Nemanja. He inherited the title of Grand Prince in 1196 when his father retired as a monk. His reign began with a struggle against his brother Vukan, who expelled Stefan to Bulgaria. Kaloyan gave him an army of Cumans in exchange for eastern territories. The crisis ended when Sava negotiated a peace between the brothers and Stefan's power was cemented. He was crowned King in 1217, and then Sava gains autocephaly, becoming the first Archbishop of Serbs in 1219, thus Serbia retained full independence.
	^{King} Stefan Radoslav	1228–1233	Son of Stefan the First-crowned. He ruled Zahumlje during the reign of his father, and also held a governor status of Zeta. He was the co-founder of the Žiča monastery with his father, who would abdicate in 1227 due to illness, taking monastic vows. Radoslav was crowned by his uncle Sava, the Archbishop of Serbia. His marriage to Anna Doukaina Angelina would prove unpopular as she undermined his authority, he lost the loyalty of the people and in 1233 a revolt against them prompted the couple to flee to Dubrovnik.
	^{King} Stefan Vladislav	1233–1243	Son of Stefan the First-crowned. He succeeded his brother Radoslav in 1233 and ruled for 10 years, before being overthrown by his younger brother Uroš. He continued to rule Zeta. The first known flag design of Serbia was found in his treasury.
	^{King} Stefan Uroš I	1243–1276	Son of Stefan the First-crowned. He succeeded his brother Vladislav. He boosted trade with Dubrovnik and Kotor, marking a beginning of economic prosperity. In 1253 a war was fought against Dubrovnik, peace was signed in 1254, and in the 1260s a second war begun that ended in 1268. Uroš immediately turned towards Hungary, successfully taking Mačva, he was however captured and peace was ensured between the two Kings through marriage of Dragutin and Catherine, the daughter of Stephen V of Hungary. His oldest son Dragutin would have succeeded his rule, but Uroš favored Stefan Milutin, the younger son, as successor. He was overthrown by Stefan Dragutin in 1276.
	^{King} Stefan Dragutin	1276–1282; 1282–1316	Son of Stefan Uroš I. He overthrew his father with help from the Hungarian royalty (through his marriage to Catherine of Hungary) after the Battle of Gacko. He was injured in 1282, and gave the supreme rule to his younger brother Milutin, but continued to rule what would later become the Kingdom of Srem with the capital at Belgrade. Milutin boosted relations with the Byzantine Emperor, and refused to give the rule to Vladislav II (Dragutin's son), causing a split of the Kingdom. Dragutin continued to rule the northern frontier in Hungarian alliance, but in the last years re-connected with Serbia, acting as a vassal.
	^{King} Stefan Milutin	1282–1321	Son of Stefan Uroš I. He succeeded his brother Dragutin. Upon his accession, he immediately turned towards Macedonia, conquering the northern part with Skoplje, which became his capital. He continued deep into Bulgarian lands, taking northern Albania and as far as Kavala. He also took Bulgarian Vidin, and later Durrës. He was in a succession war with Dragutin after peace was signed with the Byzantines in 1299. Milutin aids the Byzantines against the Ottoman Turks at the Battle of Gallipoli, which ended in a victory. When Dragutin died he put most of his lands with Belgrade under his rule, in the same year his son Stefan Dečanski tried to overthrow him, resulting in him being exiled to Constantinople. In 1319 the Hungarians took all of Dragutin's lands but Braničevo. Note: Syrmia becomes independent, ruled by the initial heir apparent: ^{King of Srem (King of the Serbs)} Stefan Vladislav II / 1316–1325 / son of Dragutin.
	^{King} Stefan Konstantin	1321–1322	Younger son of Stefan Milutin, defeated in 1322 by his older brother, Stefan Dečanski.
	^{King} Stefan Dečanski of Dečani	1322–1331	Older brother of Stefan Konstantin.
	^{Emperor ↑King} Stefan Dušan the Mighty	1331–1355	Son of Stefan Dečanski. He was a very skilled military leader, and defeated Bosnia and Bulgaria at the age of 20. As his father was not an able conqueror, Dušan removed him from the throne. Dušan doubled the size of the realm, taking Byzantine lands as far as the Peloponnese. He was crowned Emperor in 1346. The Serbian Empire flourished, and he enacted the constitution - Dušan's Code in 1349.
	^{Emperor} Stefan Uroš V the Weak	1355–1371	Son of Stefan Dušan, crowned King of Rascia (1346–1355), succeeds as Emperor after the death of Dušan in 1355. His epithet was given due to his "weak rule". Note: Succession attempts (titular Emperors): ^{Despot of Epirus and Thessaly} Simeon Uroš / Uncle of Uroš V. He was appointed governor in the southwestern conquered regions in 1348, and ruled until 1355, when his brother-in-law Nikephoros II Orsini returned and rallied support. Nikephoros was killed in 1359, and Simeon continued his rule until his death in 1371. He proclaimed himself "Emperor of Serbs and Greeks" in 1356, however against the wishes of nobility of Serbia proper and Macedonia. After an unsuccessful invasion of Zeta, he gave up the idea of ruling Serbia.; ^{Ruler of Epirus and Thessaly} Jovan Uroš / Son of Simeon Uroš. Succeeded his father as titular "Emperor of Serbs and Greeks" and ruled an area of Epirus and Thessaly 1370–1373 before taking monastic vows. In 1384–1385 he helped his sister Empress Maria Angelina Doukaina Palaiologina govern Epirus (she was the widow of Thomas II Preljubović, the Despot of Epirus 1367–1384).

== Monasteries built ==
The Nemanjić dynasty played a pivotal role in the spread of Eastern Orthodoxy throughout the Balkans. As key patrons of the Serbian Orthodox Church, the Nemanjić rulers were instrumental in the construction and endowment of numerous monastic complexes, thereby reinforcing both religious and cultural identity in medieval Serbia. Their commitment to Orthodoxy significantly contributed to their status as one of the most influential dynasties in Serbian history.

The architectural and cultural legacy of the Nemanjić period is evident in the extensive network of monasteries that continue to serve as vital historical and religious landmarks. Notable examples include UNESCO World heritage sites like Studenica Monastery, Gračanica Monastery, Hilandar Monastery, Đurđevi Stupovi, Sopoćani Monastery, Visoki Dečani Monastery, Patriarchate of Peć and Our Lady of Ljeviš.

Other notable monasteries include Žiča Monastery, Banjska Monastery, Mileševa Monastery, Gradac Monastery, Morača Monastery, Monastery of the Holy Archangels, Matejče Monastery, Church of St. Achillius and many others.

== Other members ==
- Đorđe Nemanjić (1208–1243), King (titular) of Zeta
- Stefan Vladislav II, King of Syrmia, (r. 1321–1325)

== In popular culture ==
- 1875 historical three-tome novel "Car Dušan" by Dr Vladan Đorđević tells the story of Emperor Dušan.
- 1987 historical novel "Stefan Dušan" by Slavomir Nastasijević is another story of Emperor Dušan.
- 2002 historical novel "Dušan Silni" ("Dušan the Great") by Mile Kordić.
- 2012 novel "Izvori - Roman o Nemanji i Svetom Savi" ("The Wellsprings - The story of Nemanja and Saint Sava") by Milan Miletić depicts Stefan Nemanja and his son, Saint Sava.
- 2015 novel "Gora Preobraženja" by Ljiljana Habjanović Đurović tells the story of Saint Sava.
- 2017 TV series "Nemanjići - rađanje kraljevine" (Nemanjić Dynasty: The Birth Of The Kingdom) portrays the rule of King Stefan the First-Crowned, the first King of Serbia.
- https://www.zaduzbine-nemanjica.rs/zaduzbine-nemanjica.htm

== Notes ==
1. Name: The name Stefan in Serbian is derived from Greek Stephanos (Στέφανος, tr. Stéphanos), meaning "crown". All the rulers from family Nemanjić had one, or more other names (Nemanja, Uroš, ...) with the common name Stefan. That is the main reason why some Serbian historians write, in recent works, that the name Stefan was not personal, but only a common one, or a ruler's name among the rulers from the Nemanjić family.

== See also ==
- List of Serbian monarchs
- Vojislavljević dynasty
- Branković dynasty
- Lazarević dynasty

== Sources ==
- Angold, Michael (2011). "The Latin Empire of Constantinople, 1204–1261: Marriage Strategies". Identities and Allegiances in the Eastern Mediterranean after 1204. Farnham: Ashgate Publishing Limited. pp. 47–68. ISBN 9781409410980.
- Bataković, Dušan T., ed. (2005). Histoire du peuple serbe [History of the Serbian People] (in French). Lausanne: L’Age d’Homme. ISBN 9782825119587.
- Beckwith, John (1986). Early Christian and Byzantine Art (2nd ed.). Harmondsworth: Penguin. ISBN 0300052960.
- Ćirković, Sima (2004). The Serbs. Malden: Blackwell Publishing. ISBN 9781405142915.
- Ćirković, Sima (2014) [1964]. "The Double Wreath: A Contribution to the History of Kingship in Bosnia". Balcanica (45): 107–143. doi:10.2298/BALC1445107C.
- Curta, Florin (2006). Southeastern Europe in the Middle Ages, 500–1250. Cambridge: Cambridge University Press. ISBN 9780521815390.
- Curta, Florin (2019). Eastern Europe in the Middle Ages (500-1300). Leiden and Boston: Brill. ISBN 9789004395190.
- Dvornik, Francis (1962). The Slavs in European History and Civilization. New Brunswick: Rutgers University Press. ISBN 9780813507996.
- Ferjančić, Božidar; Maksimović, Ljubomir (2014). "Sava Nemanjić and Serbia between Epiros and Nicaea". Balcanica (45): 37–54. doi:10.2298/BALC1445037F. hdl:21.15107/rcub_dais_12894.
- Fine, John V. A. Jr. (1991) [1983]. The Early Medieval Balkans: A Critical Survey from the Sixth to the Late Twelfth Century. Ann Arbor: University of Michigan Press. ISBN 0-472-08149-7.
- Fine, John V. A. (1994) [1987]. The Late Medieval Balkans: A Critical Survey from the Late Twelfth Century to the Ottoman Conquest. Ann Arbor, Michigan: University of Michigan Press. ISBN 978-0-472-10079-8.
- Gavrilović, Zaga (2001). Studies in Byzantine and Serbian Medieval Art. London: The Pindar Press. ISBN 9781899828340.
- Ivić, Pavle, ed. (1995). The History of Serbian Culture. Edgware: Porthill Publishers. ISBN 9781870732314.
- Jireček, Constantin (1911). Geschichte der Serben. Vol. 1. Gotha: Perthes.
- Jireček, Constantin (1918). Geschichte der Serben. Vol. 2. Gotha: Perthes.
- Kalić, Jovanka (2017). "The First Coronation Churches of Medieval Serbia". Balcanica (48): 7–18. doi:10.2298/BALC1748007K. hdl:21.15107/rcub_dais_4886.
- Krstić, Aleksandar R. (2016). "The Rival and the Vassal of Charles Robert of Anjou: King Vladislav II Nemanjić". Banatica. 26 (2): 33–51.
- Marjanović-Dušanić, Smilja (2006). "Lʹ idéologie monarchique dans les chartes de la dynastie serbe des Némanides (1168-1371): Étude diplomatique". Archiv für Diplomatik: Schriftgeschichte, Siegel- und Wappenkunde. 52: 149–158. doi:10.7788/afd.2006.52.jg.149. S2CID 96483243.
- McDaniel, Gordon L. (1984). "On Hungarian-Serbian Relations in the Thirteenth Century: John Angelos and Queen Jelena" (PDF). Ungarn-Jahrbuch. 12 (1982-1983): München, 1984: 43–50.
- McDaniel, Gordon L. (1986). "The House of Anjou and Serbia". Louis the Great: King of Hungary and Poland. Boulder: East European Monographs. pp. 191–200. ISBN 9780880330879.
- Nicol, Donald M. (1993) [1972]. The Last Centuries of Byzantium, 1261-1453. Cambridge: Cambridge University Press. ISBN 9780521439916.
- Obolensky, Dimitri (1974) [1971]. The Byzantine Commonwealth: Eastern Europe, 500-1453. London: Cardinal. ISBN 9780351176449.
- Orbini, Mauro (1601). Il Regno de gli Slavi hoggi corrottamente detti Schiavoni. Pesaro: Apresso Girolamo Concordia.
- Орбин, Мавро (1968). Краљевство Словена. Београд: Српска књижевна задруга.
- Ostrogorsky, George (1956). History of the Byzantine State. Oxford: Basil Blackwell.
- Popović, Danica (2019). "On Two Lost Medieval Serbian Reliquaries: The Staurothekai of King Stefan Uroš I and Queen Helen". Balcanica (50): 39–55. doi:10.2298/BALC1950039P. hdl:21.15107/rcub_dais_7795. S2CID 226868916.
- Popović, Marko (1999). Tvrđava Ras [The Fortress of Ras] (in Serbian). Belgrade: Archaeological Institute. ISBN 9788680093147.
- Popović, Svetlana (2002). "The Serbian Episcopal sees in the thirteenth century". Старинар (51: 2001): 171–184.
- Porčić, Nebojša (2016). "Information on Travel of Nemanjić Embassies: Content and Context". Balcanica (47): 97–118. doi:10.2298/BALC1647097P.
- Samardžić, Radovan; Duškov, Milan, eds. (1993). Serbs in European Civilization. Belgrade: Nova, Serbian Academy of Sciences and Arts, Institute for Balkan Studies. ISBN 9788675830153.
- Sedlar, Jean W. (1994). East Central Europe in the Middle Ages, 1000-1500. Seattle: University of Washington Press. ISBN 9780295800646.
- Soulis, George Christos (1984). The Serbs and Byzantium during the reign of Tsar Stephen Dušan (1331-1355) and his successors. Washington: Dumbarton Oaks Library and Collection. ISBN 9780884021377.
- Stanković, Vlada, ed. (2016). The Balkans and the Byzantine World before and after the Captures of Constantinople, 1204 and 1453. Lanham, Maryland: Lexington Books. ISBN 9781498513265.
- Stephenson, Paul (2000). Byzantium's Balkan Frontier: A Political Study of the Northern Balkans, 900-1204. Cambridge University Press. ISBN 9780521770170.
- Stojkovski, Boris; Kartalija, Nebojša (2019). "Serbia through the eyes of contemporary western travelers in the age of Nemanjić Dynasty (1166–1371)" (PDF). Deseti međunarodni interdisciplinarni simpozijum Susret kultura: Zbornik radova. Novi Sad: Filozofski fakultet. pp. 305–321.
