= Vojislavljević dynasty =

Serbian medieval dynasty

Vojislavljević Војислављевић
- Royal house
- Parent family: Belojević
- Country: Duklja/Doclea (modern Montenegro, Herzegovina, southernmost Dalmatia)
- Founded: 1018
- Founder: Stefan Vojislav
- Final ruler: Mihailo III of Duklja
- Titles: Prince (archon); Grand Prince (1050–1077); King of Slavs (rex Sclavorum; 1077–1080); "Prince of Serbs", "of Serbia"
- Dissolution: 1189
- Cadet branches: Vukanović –Nemanjić

The House of Vojislavljević (Serbian Cyrillic: Војислављевић, pl. Vojislavljevići / Војислављевићи) was a Serbian medieval dynasty, named after the archon Stefan Vojislav, who wrested the polities of Duklja, Travunia, Zahumlje, inner Serbia and Bosnia from the Byzantines in the mid-11th century. His successors, kings Mihailo I Vojislavljević (d. 1081) and Constantine Bodin (d. 1101) expanded and consolidated the state. During the 12th century, the main line of the Vojislavljević family was ousted by their cadet branch, the Vukanović. (which became the Nemanjić dynasty), in the late 12th century.

== History ==
=== Stefan Vojislav ===
Stefan Vojislav, the progenitor of the dynasty, was a nobleman in Byzantine service who had the titles of archon, and toparch of the Dalmatian kastra of Zeta and Ston. In 1034 he led an unsuccessful revolt that resulted in his incarceration at Constantinople, he however, managed to escape and return, this time successfully gaining independence of his statelet., which he would rule as Prince of the Serbs, a title signifying supreme leadership among the Serbs. The contemporary Byzantine writers call him a Serb. The Chronicle of the Priest of Duklja, a later, more dubious source, calls him a cousin to previous ruler Jovan Vladimir (r. 990–1016).

=== Mihailo I ===
Mihailo I became Prince in 1046. He restored independence and maintained it from the Byzantine Empire. He sought closer relations with other great powers, such as the Pope and the Normans. Mihailo installed his son Petrislav as Prince of Rascia. After the aborted rebellion in Bulgaria, the military governor of Dyrrhachium, Nicephorus Bryennius, restored Byzantine rule to Rascia in 1073. Mihailo reportedly received royal insignia in 1077 from Pope Gregory VII, although this is still a matter of debate. An image of King Mihajlo with his crown is still found in the Church of St. Michael in Ston, a town in the Pelješac peninsula (in present-day Croatia). Mihajlo's rule ended in 1081.

=== Constantine Bodin ===
His successor was his son Constantin Bodin, who ruled from 1081 to 1101. Bodin fought Byzantium and Normans further to the south, and took the town of Dyrrachium. He established vassal states in Bosnia (under Stefan) and Serbia (under Vukan and Marko), which recognized his supremacy. Vukan and Marko, the new princes of Serbia were probably sons of the aforementioned Petrislav. Vukan (1083–1115) was the Grand Župan while Marko headed administration of a part of the land. The Byzantine Emperor Alexios later forced Vukan to acknowledge Byzantine suzerainty in 1094. After Bodin died in 1101, incessant struggles for power among his heirs weakened the state. Bodin had previously exiled Dobroslav, his younger brother, together with their cousin Kočapar. In 1101 they returned, and vied for power together with another grandson of Mihajlo's, Vladimir. Vladimir at one point married the daughter of Vukan of Serbia.

=== Decline ===
In 1114, Đorđe, son of Constantin Bodin, came to power in Duklja. The next year Vukan was replaced in Serbia by his nephew Uroš I. (ca. 1115–1131). Đorđe's rule lasted until 1118. One of the sons of Uroš I was Zavida, Prince of Zahumlje. His four sons would eventually bring order to the Rascian lands and found the House of Nemanja.

In these struggles, the pro-Serbian rulers eventually managed to rise to power in Duklja, culminating in the rise of Stefan Nemanja, one of Zavida's sons (around 1166). His son Stefan Nemanjić restored the old Doclean crown in 1217 by receiving from the Pope regal insignia as "King of all Serbian and Maritime Lands".

== List of rulers ==
Picture	Name	Title	Reign	Notes
	Stefan Vojislav (Dobroslav I)	"Prince of the Serbs" or "of Serbia"	1018–1043	Overthrew the Byzantine supremacy over Slavs in Duklja; founder of the Vojislavljević dynasty; in 1035 rebelled against the Byzantine Empire, but forced to sign an armistice; went to war again in 1040, which would be continued by his heir and son, Mihailo. Except Duklja, his realm included Travunija with Konavli and Zahumlje.
According to the Chronicle of the Priest of Duklja, between 1043 and 1046, Duklja was ruled by Neda (1043—1046) and Gojislav Vojislavljević
	Mihailo I	"Prince of Tribals and Serbs" "King of Slavs"	1046–1081	Ruled Dioclea as the King, initially as a Byzantine vassal holding the title of protospatharios, then after 1077 as nominally serving Pope Gregory VII. He had alienated himself from the Byzantines when he supported a 1071 Slavic revolt in 1071. In 1077 he received a royal insignia by Gregory VII in the aftermath of the Church schism of 1054.
	Constantine Bodin	"protosebastos and executor of Dioklea and Serbia" King (titular)	1081–1101	In addition to Doclea, his country included Travunia, Zahumlje, inner Serbia and Bosnia. He was one of the leaders of the 1072 Slavic uprising against Byzantium, taking the title of Tsar of Bulgaria, under the name of "Peter III". Byzantines proclaim him the Protosebastos.
	Dobroslav II	"King of Slavs" (titular)	1101–1102	Dobroslav was the one of four sons of King Michael I. Although Dobroslav being the eldest son, Michael had chosen his favourite, Constantine Bodin, to succeed him. Bodin ruled unchallenged until his death in 1101. Dobroslav II succeeded as titular "King of Slavs".
Chronicle also claims that the following members of the same family ruled Duklja, however, none are mentioned in contemporary sources.: King Mihailo II (1102); King Kočopar (1102–1103); King Vladimir II (1103–1114); King Đorđe (1114–1118, 1125–1131); King Grubeša (1118–1125); King Gradinja (1131–1145); Prince Radoslav (1146–1148, 1162); Prince Mihailo III (cca. 1180–86/89); Princess Desislava (1186–1189, disputed)

== Family tree ==
- Stefan Vojislav
  - Gojslav
  - Radoslav
    - Branislav
      - Kočapar (fl. 1102–03)
      - Grubeša
      - Gradinja (fl. 1125–45)
        - Radoslav (fl. 1146–1148, 1162)
          - Mihailo III (fl. 1180–86)
    - Gradislav
      - Berinja
    - Saganek
    - Predimir
  - Mihailo I, King of Slavs (Duklja)
    - Dobroslav II
    - Vladimir
    - Konstantin Bodin
      - Mihajlo II
      - Đorđe Bodinović (fl. 1113–31)
    - Petrislav, Prince of Raška (ca. 1050–1083)
      - Vukan
      - Marko
        - Vukanović dynasty

== See also ==
- List of Serbian monarchs

== Annotations ==
1. According to contemporary Byzantine sources, the members of this family were Serb.

== Sources ==
Primary sources

- Шишић, Фердо, ed. (1928). Летопис Попа Дукљанина (Chronicle of the Priest of Duklja). Београд-Загреб: Српска краљевска академија.
- Кунчер, Драгана (2009). Gesta Regum Sclavorum. Vol. 1. Београд-Никшић: Историјски институт, Манастир Острог.
- Живковић, Тибор (2009). Gesta Regum Sclavorum. Vol. 2. Београд-Никшић: Историјски институт, Манастир Острог.
- Thurn, Hans, ed. (1973). Ioannis Scylitzae Synopsis historiarum. Berlin-New York: De Gruyter. ISBN 9783110022858.

Secondary sources

- Bataković, Dušan T., ed. (2005). Histoire du peuple serbe [History of the Serbian People] (in French). Lausanne: L’Age d’Homme. ISBN 9782825119587.
- Ćirković, Sima (2004). The Serbs. Malden: Blackwell Publishing. ISBN 9781405142915.
- Curta, Florin (2006). Southeastern Europe in the Middle Ages, 500–1250. Cambridge: Cambridge University Press. ISBN 9780521815390.
- Fine, John Van Antwerp Jr. (1991) [1983]. The Early Medieval Balkans: A Critical Survey from the Sixth to the Late Twelfth Century. Ann Arbor, Michigan: University of Michigan Press. ISBN 0472081497.
- Lazarević, Dragana (2014). "The Invention of the Balkan Identities: Finding the Founding Fathers and the Myths of Origin - the Montenegrin Case". Историја и географија: Сусрети и прожимања. Београд: Институт за новију историју Србије. pp. 423–443. ISBN 9788670051256.
- Obolensky, Dimitri (1974) [1971]. The Byzantine Commonwealth: Eastern Europe, 500-1453. London: Cardinal.
- Ostrogorsky, George (1956). History of the Byzantine State. Oxford: Basil Blackwell.
- Samardžić, Radovan; Duškov, Milan, eds. (1993). Serbs in European Civilization. Belgrade: Nova, Serbian Academy of Sciences and Arts, Institute for Balkan Studies.
- Stephenson, Paul (2000). Byzantium's Balkan Frontier: A Political Study of the Northern Balkans, 900–1204. Cambridge: Cambridge University Press. ISBN 9780521770170.
- Stephenson, Paul (2003a). The Legend of Basil the Bulgar-Slayer. Cambridge: Cambridge University Press. ISBN 9780521815307.
- Stephenson, Paul (2003b). "The Balkan Frontier in the Year 1000". Byzantium in the Year 1000. BRILL. pp. 109–134. ISBN 9004120971.
- Vlasto, Alexis P. (1970). The Entry of the Slavs into Christendom: An Introduction to the Medieval History of the Slavs. Cambridge: Cambridge University Press. ISBN 9780521074599.
- Živković, Tibor (2008). Forging unity: The South Slavs between East and West 550-1150. Belgrade: The Institute of History, Čigoja štampa. ISBN 9788675585732.
- Živković, Tibor (2013b). "The Urban Landscape of Early Medieval Slavic Principalities in the Territories of the Former Praefectura Illyricum and in the Province of Dalmatia (ca. 610-950)". The World of the Slavs: Studies of the East, West and South Slavs: Civitas, Oppidas, Villas and Archeological Evidence (7th to 11th Centuries AD). Belgrade: The Institute for History. pp. 15–36. ISBN 9788677431044.
