= Vladimir II of Duklja =

Duklja and other Serbian polities in the late 11th century.

Vladimir II (Serbian Cyrillic: Владимир; died 1118) was King of Duklja (southern parts of present-day Montenegro and northwestern parts of present-day Albania) from 1103 to 1113. He was a son of prince Vladimir, the oldest son of King Mihailo I of Duklja (r. 1050–1081), and thus a nephew of King Constantine Bodin (r. 1081–1101). He married a daughter of Vukan, the Grand Prince of Serbia, thereby ending rivalries between the two polities. Vladimir had been appointed the rule of Duklja by his father-in-law Vukan, after the death of his uncle, former King Kočopar, in Zahumlje. He was poisoned in 1118 on the orders of Queen-Dowager Jaquinta, the widow of his uncle, Constantine Bodin. Jaquinta soon appointed her son, George, to the throne.

== See also ==
- Duklja
- Vojislavljević dynasty
- Vukanović dynasty
- Grand Principality of Serbia

== Sources ==
- Кунчер, Драгана (2009). Gesta Regum Sclavorum. Vol. 1. Београд-Никшић: Историјски институт, Манастир Острог.
- Живковић, Тибор (2009). Gesta Regum Sclavorum. Vol. 2. Београд-Никшић: Историјски институт, Манастир Острог.
- Živković, Tibor (2008). Forging unity: The South Slavs between East and West 550-1150. Belgrade: The Institute of History, Čigoja štampa. ISBN 9788675585732.

Political offices
Preceded by Kočapar	King of Duklja; 1103–1113	Succeeded by George
