= Tihomir of Serbia =

Tihomir
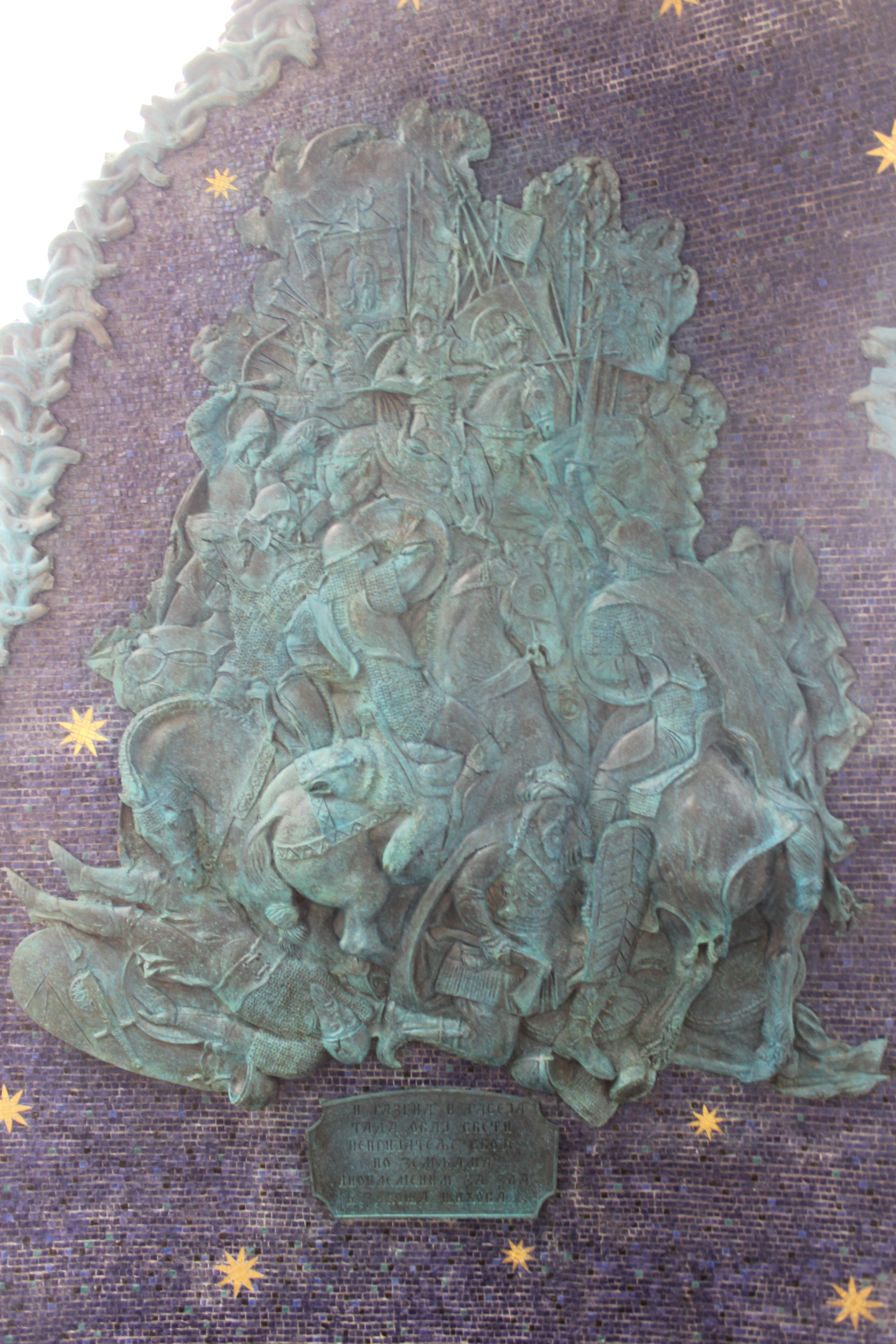
- Battle of Pantino, at the Monument to Stefan Nemanja in Belgrade.

Grand Prince of Serbia
- Reign: 1165–1166
- Predecessor: Desa
- Successor: Stefan Nemanja
- Born: c. 1105
- Died: 1168 or before 1186
- Issue: Stefan Prvoslav
Names
- Tihomir Zavidović (Тихомир Завидовић)
- Dynasty: Vukanović
- Father: Zavida
- Religion: Eastern Orthodoxy

Tihomir (Serbian Cyrillic: Тихомир, c. 1105–fl. 1168) was the Grand Prince (veliki župan) of Serbia in 1165–1166. The first-born of Zavida, their family was exiled for one or two decades. Historiography is uncertain whether Zavida came to rule Serbia, however, it is known that his sons Tihomir, Stracimir, Miroslav and Nemanja were given shares of the land. Members of the Byzantine camp, the brothers' oldest, Tihomir, succeeded the Serbian throne in 1165 following continued rebellion by their relatives. Nemanja, the youngest brother, ousted Tihomir in 1166 and defeated a Serbian–Byzantine army in 1168, thereby securing his rule. The fate of Tihomir following 1168 is unknown, either he died in battle, governed a province under Nemanja, or served as a Byzantine governor in Skopje.

== Family ==
Tihomir was born in c. 1105, the first-born son of Zavida who belonged to the Vukanović dynasty of Serbia (Raška). He had three brothers, Stracimir, Miroslav and Nemanja. Although there are variations in Serbian chronicles of the number and names of the brothers, historiography counts four brothers (Tihomir, Stracimir, Miroslav, Nemanja). In the Life of St. Symeon (1208), a hagiography of Stefan Nemanja written by his son Serbian archbishop Sava, and Domentian's Life of St. Symeon (1263/1264), their father was deposed (he "lost the throne due to a rebellion led by his brothers"). His family took refuge in Zeta, where the youngest, Nemanja, was born. After some years in exile, while Nemanja was still a child, the family returned to Raška. The family was closely related to the ruling family of Serbia at the time, but it is unknown exactly how. Serbian historian T. Živković (2006) concluded Uroš I was the son of Marko, and Zavida was the son of Vukan (r. 1083–1112), and Zavida was therefore the legitimate heir of Vukan. Serb-inhabited territories were under Byzantine vassalage, and the veliki župan was confirmed by the emperor.

== Events in Serbia (1112–1145) ==
There are several views in historiography on the succession of the Serbian throne following Vukan and Uroš I.

- According to J. Kalić, Vukan's nephew Uroš I took power after his death. Uroš I was imprisoned by his relatives, and Đorđe Bodinović freed him. Nemanja's family were relatives of the dynasties in Raška and Zeta. During unrest, Zavida and his family fled to Zeta where Nemanja was born.
- According to T. Živković, who used passages of the Chronicle of the Priest of Duklja that were largely unused in historiography, Vukan's oldest son Zavida succeeded the Serbian throne upon his death in the beginning of 1112. Zavida, as his father, relied on Byzantium; it seems that his uncle Marko (Vukan's brother) who ruled in the northern parts interfered in the succession, most likely with Hungarian support. After only some months, Zavida was forced to abdicate, being ousted by his cousins Uroš (I) and Stefan Vukan, and moved to his birthplace of Ribnica in Upper Zeta. At the same time, there was a dynastic conflict in Duklja, which ended with Đorđe Bodinović's exile with Uroš I in Raška in 1113/1114. Byzantium was preoccupied with events in the East, and Uroš I's coup was left uncontested, perhaps as Uroš I did not put pressure on Byzantine territory. In 1120/1121, Đorđe Bodinović retook Duklja with Uroš I's help, and he tried to have one of his cousins, Gradinja, who had fled to Raška and married a daughter of Zavida, to return to Duklja and support him. Uroš I was ousted some time between 1123 and 1125 by relatives, including Gradinja, and was imprisoned. Zavida then ruled Raška, until he was attacked by Hungarian troops sent by Stephen II of Hungary and taken prisoner, while Zavida's sons continued ruling in Raška until Đorđe freed Uroš I and overthrew them in 1126. Uroš I began his second reign with the conquest of Byzantine frontier fortress Ras in 1127, but the Byzantine emperor intervened and forced Uroš to make peace. The Serbian throne was succeeded by Uroš II in 1144 or 1145.
- According to Komatina and Komatina (2021), Zavida was ousted before 1113 by his brothers, then returned to Serbia some time between 1129 and 1134, upon the death of Uroš I, and regained the Serbian throne. It is noted that the prevalent opinion in historiography is that Zavida was not a veliki župan as he is not mentioned in Miroslav's inscription in Bijelo Polje. Zavida's sons received lands during his reign (1130/1134–1143/1146), in the 1130s. I. Komatina earlier believed Zavida's sons received territories around the time of Uroš II's revolt against Byzantium (1149), however, Nemanja's son Stefan claimed his father (born in 1113) received "a part of the fatherland" when he was adolescent. The territories of Nemanja laid in the eastern part of the Serbian lands: the four župa (Toplica, Ibar, Rasine, Reke), located between the Ibar river and the left banks of the South Morava. Although not mentioned explicitly by Stefan, it can be concluded that Miroslav received Polimlje, Stracimir received Pomoravlje, and Tihomir, the oldest, must have held lands in the most important part of Serbia, outside Ras. After Zavida's probable death in 1143 or 1146, Uroš II ruled Serbia. Zavida's sons kept their share of lands.

== Reigns of Uroš II and Desa ==
The Serbian throne was succeeded by Uroš II in 1144 or 1145 according to T. Živković, or 1143 or 1146 according to Komatina. In 1149, Uroš II revolted and raided Byzantine territory, which resulted in two Byzantine campaigns against Serbia in 1149–1150 which ended with Byzantine victory and renewal of vassal obligations.

In 1153 or 1155, the rivals of Uroš II ousted him and put his brother Desa, the ruler of Pomorje, on the throne. The cause of his ousting was the continued Byzantine vassalage, and Beloš organized for Desa to take the Serbian throne. The Serbian župani (counts) feared that Manuel would react, and knew that Uroš II had the support of Manuel, and thus asked him to arbitrate. There were two camps in Serbia, a pro-Byzantine and a pro-Hungarian; Uroš II was the leader of the Byzantine camp and was likely supported by the sons of Zavida. Manuel hosted the Serbian župani and Uroš II and Desa at Niš, and gave his support to, or chose Uroš II to rule Serbia. While resolving the Serbian throne, among other things, Manuel designated for other župani "their shares, borders and patrimonies, making sure that the assigned parts are inalienable for those who faithfully adhere to what has been determined". Desa came to govern the province of Dendra towards Niš. Uroš II continued as a loyal vassal until 1162, during the Byzantine–Hungarian war, when he rose up once again but was finally removed by Manuel and succeeded by Beloš. Beloš left Serbia after a short while and returned to Hungary, and Desa succeeded the throne. In the summer or second half of 1165, Desa, the last of that line of Vukanović, was deposed by Byzantine emperor Manuel I Komnenos who replaced him with Tihomir. During the reigns of Uroš's sons, Zavida's sons were not seen as pretenders to the Serbian throne. Duklja was under direct Byzantine rule at the time.

== Reign of Tihomir and rise of Nemanja ==
According to the hagiographies Nemanja had built a church and began erecting another, the latter opposed by his brothers who believed he should have asked for their consent, and felt he had elevated himself above them. When Nemanja refused to do so, the brothers persuaded the eldest (Tihomir), who was the veliki župan, to capture and imprison him in a cave dungeon. Nemanja managed to escape and then fought his brothers, seized power, and expelled them. This happened in April–August 1166. Niketas Choniates claims Manuel learnt that Nemanja had "become more bold than needed ... and, carried away by insatiable desires and keenly striving to expand into all the regions there, he fiercely attacked his fellow tribesmen and turned his sword against his own people". Nemanja had thus wrested power and was not recognized by emperor Manuel. The hagiographies tell that some of the expelled gathered in Byzantine territory, hoping to receive support. The brothers likely were exiled in Skopje. Manuel sent support; the brothers returned with an army of Greeks, Franks and Turks, a Byzantine contingent led by Theodore Padiates, but were defeated by Nemanja at Pantino (near Zvečan), where many drowned in the Sitnica river, including "the evil leader" of Nemanja's enemies. Ljubomir Kovačević identified Tihomir as the leader against Nemanja, who drowned, and Serbian historiography tends to support this. The battle is dated to 1168, and Nemanja was recognized by emperor Manuel in autumn 1168.

An inscription (itself a copy of the original dating to 1208–1220) of Stefan Prvoslav in the Monastery of St. George (Đurđevi stupovi), which includes "Stefan župan Prvoslav, the son of ...omir, nephew of Saint Symeon Nemanja", has been reliably reconstructed to mention Tihomir (who in some chronicles is wrongly called the father of Nemanja).

== Recent theories ==
Polish historian B. Szefliński (2017) believed the leader who drowned was somebody else—an initiator of the conspiracy against Nemanja—and not the veliki župan Tihomir, instead probably another brother who may have been named Konstantin. Miroslav and Stracimir are mentioned in the Serbian–Ragusan peace treaty of 1186. S. Pirivatrić recently put forward the thesis that archon Jovan Tihomir who was active in Skopje in 1200 was the son of veliki župan Tihomir, and he was perhaps the father of Bulgarian emperor Constantine I Tih (r. 1257–1277), who himself stated Stefan Nemanja was his grandfather. B. Szefliński believes Tihomir survived Pantino, eventually recognized Nemanja's supremacy (as Miroslav and Stracimir did) and received a province, and/or settled in Skopje, and if he was part of the Serbian government, he must have died before 1186.

== Annotations ==
1. Polish historian J. Leśny (1989) believed Zavida was the oldest son of veliki župan Uroš I (r. 1112–1145), and therefore the legitimate heir.

== Sources ==
- Kalić, Jovanka (1970). "Српско-византијски сукоб 1168. године". Зборник Филозофског факултета. 11 (1): 193–204.
- Kalić, Jovanka (1971a). "Јован Кинам" [Ioannis Kinnamos]. Византијски извори за историју народа Југославије, том IV. IV. Византолошки институт: 1–106.
- Kalić, Jovanka (1982). "Српски велики жупани у борби с Византијом". Историја српског народа. Vol. 1. pp. 197–211.
- Kartalija, Nebojša (2015). "Српско-угарски односи у контексту византијске спољне политике крајем XI и почетком XII века". Konteksti, Zbornik radova. Novi Sad: 571–580 – via Academia.edu.
- Komatina, Ivana (2020). "И обнови своју дедовину и боље је утврди ‒ Стефан Немања и Стефан Првовенчани и уобличавање српске државности" (PDF). Стефан Првовенчани и његово доба. Историјски институт: 37–58.
- Komatina, Ivana; Komatina, Predrag (2021). "Family Patrimony and the Legacy of the First-Born Son. Some Examples From European Monarchies in the 11th–12th Centuries". Istraživanja. 32: 36–54.
- Leśny, Jan (1989). "Stefan Zavida als Sohn von Uros I. und Vater von Stefan Nemanja: Ein Beitrag zur serbischen Prosopographie". Südost-Forschungen. 48: 37–49.
- Pirivatrić, Srđan (1991). "Прилог хронологији почетка Немањине власти" [A contribution to the chronology of the beginning of the reign of Nemanja]. Зборник радова Византолошког института. 29–30. Византолошки институт: 125–136.
- Pirivatrić, Srđan (2009). "Једна претпоставка о пореклу бугарског цара Константина Асена «Тиха»" [Une Hypothese Sur L’origine Du Tsar De Bulgarie Constantin Asen "Tich"]. Зборник радова Византолошког института. 46. Византолошки институт: 313–331 – via CEEOL.
- Pirivatrić, Srđan (2011a). "Manuel i Komnenos, „Carski san" and „Samodržci oblasti srpskog prestola"" (PDF). Зборник радова Византолошког института (48). National Library of Serbia: 89–118. doi:10.2298/zrvi1148089p. ISSN 0584-9888.
- Pirivatrić, Srđan (2011b). "О Стефану Првославу, ктитору цркве Светог Георгија у Будимљи". Ђурђеви ступови и Будимљанска епархија: зборник радова. Беране–Београд: 53–67.
- Szefliński, Błażej (2017). "O tajemniczym poprzedniku wielkiego żupana Serbii Stefana Nemanji, zwanym Tihomirem" [On the Mysterious Predecessor of Grand Župan of Serbia Stephen Nemanja called Tihomir]. Balcanica Posnaniensia Acta et studia. 23. Adam Mickiewicz University Poznan: 35–46. doi:10.14746/bp.2016.23.3. ISSN 2450-3177.
- Zarković, Božidar (2020). "Битка код Пантина 1168. године и јединство српске државе" (PDF). Баштина. 52: 283–298.
- Živković, Tibor (2006). Портрети српских владара: IX-XII век [Portraits of Serbian Rulers: IX-XII century]. Завод за уџбенике и наставна средства, Београд. ISBN 9788617137548.
- Živković, Tibor (2006b). "Синови Завидини". Зборник Матице српске за историју. 73: 7–27.

Tihomir of Serbia Vukanović dynasty Born: c. 1105 Died: 1168 or before 1186
Regnal titles
Preceded by Desa	Grand Prince of Serbia; 1165–1166	Succeeded by Stefan Nemanja
