= Vukanović dynasty =

Medieval Serbian dynasty

Vukanović Вукановић
- Royal family
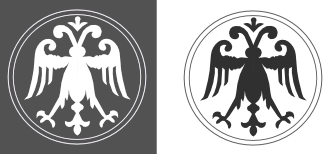
- Eagle from Miroslav's endowment
- Country: Serbia
- Origin: Serbia
- Founded: 1083; 943 years ago
- Founder: Vukan
- Titles: veliki župan, veliki knez, knez, župan
- Dissolution: 1166 (became Nemanjić dynasty in Serbia); 1252 (in Hum)
- Cadet branches: Nemanjić dynasty

The Vukanović dynasty (Serbian: Вукановићи) was a medieval Serb dynasty that ruled Serbia in the 11th and 12th century. Several members of the Vukanović dynasty also ruled other polities, such as Zachumlia, Travunia, and Duklja. The dynasty was succeeded in Serbia by its cadet branch, the Nemanjić dynasty.

== History ==
=== Background ===
The information on Serbia as a political entity in the 10th century ends with De Administrando Imperio and Serbian ruler Časlav. The Chronicle of the Priest of Duklja (LPD) claims that after the death of John I Tzimiskes (976), there was a rebellion instigated by the ruler of Duklja, after which "all of Rascia" (Serbia) came under his rule. It is probable that after the Kometopouloi rebellion, the ruler of Duklja took the opportunity to expand into Serbia in the hinterland. Until 1016, Duklja and parts of the Serbian hinterland was ruled by Jovan Vladimir, as Skylitzes mentions him "governing Triballia and neighbouring regions of Serbia" (Τριβαλίας καὶ τῶν ἀγχοτάτω Σερβίας μερῶν ἦρχε Βλαδιμιρός). Between 1018 and 1034 there was continuity of Byzantine rule in Serbia. Serbia and Duklja constituted one state since Stefan Vojislav's rebellion in 1039/1040–1042.

In the second half of the 11th century, the Serb struggle against Byzantine overlordship shifted from the maritime provinces to the Serbian hinterland.

=== Vukan and Marko ===
Constantine Bodin conquered the Byzantine territories of Serbia ("Raška") and Bosnia in 1083–1084, and appointed Vukan, Marko, and Stefan, his vassals there. Vukan and Marko were most likely brothers, and the LPD claims how "two župans of his (Bodin's) court, Vukan and Marko, swore that they and their sons would be rightful vassal of king Bodin and his sons and heirs". T. Živković studied the Serbian chronicles and hagiographies and concluded that Stefan Nemanja's ancestors had ruled in Polimlje. The territory of Vukan and Marko included parts of the former Catepanate of Ras and Theme of Serbia. Marko's territory most likely included Mačva, northeastern Bosnia and the lower Drina. Vukan's territory included what is today southwestern Serbia (including Raška), northern and western Metohija, and eastern Montenegro. In Serbia ("Raška"), Vukan and Marko founded a new dynasty.

Beginning with Vukan, the Serbs expanded their struggle against Byzantium in wider territory, including Kosovo, crossing the Ras–Zvečan–Prizren line. Vukan and Bodin were countered by doux John Doukas, and Bodin was captured, while Vukan continued, even managing to defeat John Komnenos. Next, Vukan attacked Skopje, Polog and Vranje, which resulted in a peace treaty with Alexios I Komnenos in 1094 and Serbian hostages, including his nephews Uroš and Stefan Vukan. After Bodin's death in 1101, Duklja was caught up in a dynastic war in which Vukan participated. In 1106, Vukan renewed attacks and defeated John Komnenos once again, and another truce was signed. Upon Vukan's death, his nephew Uroš took the rule of Serbia.

=== Uroš I, Uroš II, Desa ===
The expansion of Hungary into Croatia and changing Byzantine–Hungarian relations led Serbia into international politics. In 1127, Hungary invaded Byzantine territory and attacked Belgrade and penetrated to Niš, Sofia and Plovdiv, and Serbia joined in and attacked Byzantine fortress Ras. The war was fought for two years, mostly on the Danube around Belgrade and Braničevo, and John II Komnenos led forces himself, ending with status quo in 1129. During this period, firmer relations with Hungary began through dynastic marriage, with Uroš's daughter marrying the Hungarian heir, and then becoming queen consort. This gave Uroš support in his struggle for independence. By 1148, the political situation in the Balkans was divided into the alliance of Byzantium and Venice, and that between the Siculo-Normans and Hungary; Serbia entered alliance with the Normans and Hungary and in 1149 raided the Byzantine frontier while Manuel I Komnenos was planning to attack Roger II in Italy. Manuel campaigned against Serbia in 1149 and conquered several fortresses, but was however unable to pursue the Serbs into the mountains, nor to capture Uroš II, and returned home to continue the next year, when the Byzantines won in battle and forced him to renew vassal obligations. At one point, the rivals of Uroš II ousted him and put his brother Desa on the throne, but Manuel arbitrated on the request of the Serbian nobility and chose Uroš II to continue the rule. In 1162, during the Byzantine–Hungarian war, Uroš II rose up once again, seeing the opportunity, but he was finally removed by Manuel and his brother Beloš succeeded him, but Beloš returned to Hungary after a short while and Desa succeeded the throne.

== Titles ==
The rulers of this dynasty were split into two branches: the branch in Serbia (Latin: Rascia, "Raška") and the branch in Hum or Zahumlje (Latin: Zachumlia). The rulers in Serbia bore the title veliki župan (Greek: archizoupanos, "Grand Prince"), while the branch in Hum bore the title of knez and veliki knez. Other individual titles included Ban of Slavonia, held by Beloš of the branch in Raška, Prince of Duklja and Travunia, held by Desa of the same branch, and Count of Split, held by Petar of the Hum branch. Other titles included Duke of Upper Zachumlia, held by Toljen II of the Hum branch, Duke of Southern Zachumlia and Prince of the Littoral, held by Andrija of the Hum branch.

== Family tree ==
The Vukanović family tree has had several variations, owing to earlier uncertainty in historiography regarding the genealogy of the generation after Vukan and Marko. The line of Uroš I was earlier believed to descend from Vukan, but it has been concluded that it descended from Marko.

- Vukan (c. 1050–1112), veliki župan of Serbia (r. 1083–1112)
  - Zavida (fl. 1112–1126), possibly veliki župan of Serbia (r. 1112), exiled in Zeta
    - Tihomir (c. 1105–1168), veliki župan of Serbia (r. 1166)
      - (possibly) Jovan Tihomir (fl. 1200s), archon of Skopje
    - Stracimir (c. 1107–1186), župan of West Morava, knez (t. 1166–fl. 1186)
    - Miroslav (c. 1109–1198), župan of Hum, knez (t. 1166–1190)
      - Toljen, knez of Hum (t. 1190s)
      - Petar (?–1227), knez of Hum (t. 1198–1216), knez of Split (t. 1222–1225)
      - Andrija (c.1188–1250), knez of Hum (Ston and Popovo, t. 1216–1218)
    - Nemanja (1113–1199), župan of Toplica, Ibar, Rasine, Reke (t. fl. 1166), veliki župan of Serbia (r. 1166–1196)
      - Vukan, knez of Duklja, Travunija, Hum, Hvosno and Toplica (t. 1190–fl. 1207); veliki župan of Serbia (1202–1204) (Nemanjić dynasty)
      - Stefan, veliki župan of Serbia (r. 1196–1202, 1204–1217), King of Serbia (1217–1228) (Nemanjić dynasty)
      - Rastko, knez of Hum (1190–1192), monk, first archbishop of Serbia (1219–1233) (Nemanjić dynasty)
    - A daughter, married Gradinja.
  - A daughter, married Vladimir II of Duklja (r. 1101–1112).
- Marko (fl. 1083–1124), župan, "territorial prince" in northern Serbia towards Hungary
  - Uroš I, veliki župan of Serbia (r. 1112–1145)
    - Uroš II, veliki župan of Serbia (r. 1145–1162)
    - Beloš, Palatine of Hungary, Ban of Slavonia (t. 1146–1157, 1163); veliki župan of Serbia (r. 1162)
      - "Banovna" (fl. 1150–1171), married Vladimir III of Kiev (r. 1171)
    - Desa, knez of Zeta and Travunija (1143–?), Serbian usurper (1153 or 1155), župan of Dendra (1155), veliki župan of Serbia (r. 1162–1165)
      - A daughter, married Leonardo Michiel, titular knez of Usora (fl. 1168/1169)
    - Jelena, married Béla II of Hungary (r. 1131–1141)
    - Marija, married Conrad II of Znojmo (t. 1123–1128, 1134–1161)
  - Stefan Vukan (fl. 1094)

== See also ==
- Vojislavljević dynasty
- Nemanjić dynasty
- Lazarević dynasty
- Branković dynasty

== Sources ==
- Kalić, Jovanka (1982). "Српски велики жупани у борби с Византијом". Историја српског народа. Vol. 1. pp. 197–211.
- Kartalija, Nebojša (2015). "Српско-угарски односи у контексту византијске спољне политике крајем XI и почетком XII века". Konteksti, Zbornik radova. Novi Sad: 571–580 – via Academia.edu.
- Komatina, Predrag (2012). "Србија и Дукља у делу Јована Скилице" [Serbia and Dioclea in the work of John Scylitzes]. Зборник радова Византолошког института (49). National Library of Serbia: 159–186. doi:10.2298/zrvi1249159k. ISSN 0584-9888.
- Komatina, Ivana (2015). "Srpski vladari u Aleksijadi - hronološki okviri delovanja" [Serbian rulers in the Alexiad - some chronological notes] (PDF). Зборник радова Византолошког института. LII.
- Komatina, Ivana; Komatina, Predrag (2021). "Family Patrimony and the Legacy of the First-Born Son. Some Examples From European Monarchies in the 11th–12th Centuries". Istraživanja. 32: 36–54.
- Živković, Tibor (2006). Портрети српских владара: IX-XII век [Portraits of Serbian Rulers: IX-XII century]. Завод за уџбенике и наставна средства, Београд. ISBN 9788617137548.
- Živković, Tibor (2005). "Jedna hipoteza o poreklu velikog župana Uroša I" (PDF). Историјски часопис. 52. Историјски институт: 9–22.
- Veselinović, Andrija; Ljušić, Radoš (2001). "Вукановићи". Српске династије [Serb Dynasties]. Нови Сад: Плантонеум. pp. 39-. ISBN 978-86-83639-01-4.
