= Marko (župan) =

- župan
- Died: after 1124
- Spouse: Likely Hungarian
- Issue: Uroš and Stefan Vukan
- Dynasty: (Vukanović)
- Religion: Christianity

Marko (Serbian: Марко; fl. 1083–1124) was a Serbian župan (count) that governed parts of what was Serbia under the king Constantine Bodin of Duklja (r. 1081–1101). His territory most likely included Mačva, northeastern Bosnia and the lower Drina.

== History ==
Marko is mentioned in the Chronicle of the Priest of Duklja (LPD) and Mauro Orbini's Kingdom of the Slavs (1601), and only indirectly by Byzantine sources. Orbini claims that Marko was also called Mavro. Bodin conquered the Byzantine territories of Serbia ("Raška") and Bosnia in 1083–1084, and appointed Vukan, Marko, and Stefan, his vassals there. Vukan and Marko were most likely brothers, and the LPD claims how "two župans of his [Bodin's] court, Vukan and Marko, swore that they and their sons would be rightful vassal of king Bodin and his sons and heirs". T. Živković studied the Serbian chronicles and hagiographies and concluded that Stefan Nemanja's ancestors had ruled in Polimlje. The territory of Vukan and Marko included parts of the former Catepanate of Ras and Theme of Serbia. Marko's territory most likely included Mačva, northeastern Bosnia and the lower Drina. Vukan's territory included what is today southwestern Serbia (including Raška), northern and western Metohija, and eastern Montenegro. In Serbia ("Raška"), Vukan and Marko founded a new dynasty. In 1093–1094, Vukan started an offensive against the Byzantine Empire to expand to the south and southeast, which ended with a peace treaty where Vukan sent his two nephews (Marko's sons) Uroš and Stefan Vukan (or Stefan and Vukan), along with 20 notables, as security. The fact that his sons were given as hostages means he actively participated in the war. According to T. Živković (2006), Marko's wife was likely Hungarian, judging by the name of his son Uroš (derived from ur, "prince", equivalent of Serbian Prvoslav and Latinized version Primislav), while according to Ž. Veljković (2009) the name was rather an Old Serbian hypocoristic of Uro, itself a hypocoristic of three given names of Dalmatian origin. He must have very early on entered marital relations with an influential Hungarian family. T. Živković dates the marriage to 1084/1085.

Vukan's heir Zavida was ousted in 1112 by Marko's sons Uroš and Stefan Vukan (or Stefan and Vukan), most likely with Hungarian help. This shows that Marko had good relations with the Hungarian elite. Marko, as comes is mentioned in two Hungarian charters dating to 1111 and 1124 among counts. According to T. Živković (2006), Zavida was reinstated in 1123, having imprisoned Uroš I, only to be captured during the incursion of Stephen II of Hungary into Serbia in 1126, while according to Komatina (2021), Zavida was ousted before 1113, then returned to Serbia some time between 1129 and 1134, upon the death of Uroš I, and regained the Serbian throne.

== Sources ==
- Kartalija, Nebojša (2015). "Српско-угарски односи у контексту византијске спољне политике крајем XI и почетком XII века". Konteksti, Zbornik radova. Novi Sad: 571–580 – via Academia.edu.
- Komatina, Ivana; Komatina, Predrag (2021). "Family Patrimony and the Legacy of the First-Born Son. Some Examples From European Monarchies in the 11th–12th Centuries". Istraživanja. 32: 36–54.
- Živković, Tibor (2006). Портрети српских владара: IX-XII век [Portraits of Serbian Rulers: IX-XII century]. Завод за уџбенике и наставна средства, Београд. ISBN 9788617137548.
- Živković, Tibor (2005). "Jedna hipoteza o poreklu velikog župana Uroša I" (PDF). Историјски часопис. 52. Историјски институт: 9–22.
- Živković, Tibor (2006b). "Синови Завидини". Зборник Матице српске за историју. 73: 7–27.
