= Zavida =

12th-century Serbian royalty

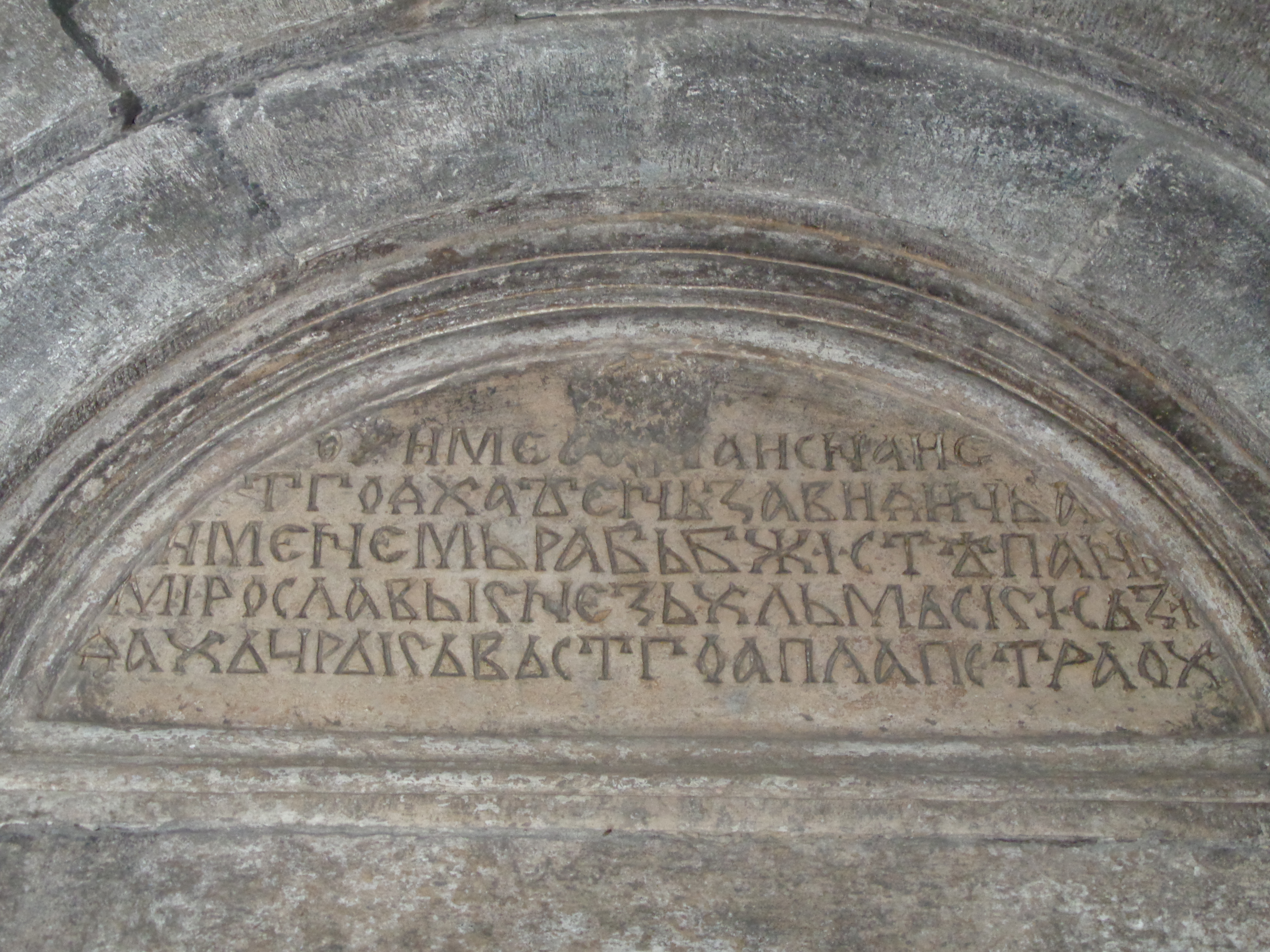
- The ktetor inscription in the Church of the Holy Apostles in Bijelo Polje, mentioning knez Miroslav of Hum as son of Zavida

Grand Prince of Serbia
- Reign: 1112
- Predecessor: Vukan
- Successor: Uroš I
- Died: 1126 or 1143/1146
- Issue: Tihomir, Stracimir, Miroslav and Nemanja
- Dynasty: Vukanović
- Father: Vukan
- Religion: Christianity

Zavida (Serbian: Завида; fl. 1112) was a Serbian prince, possibly the Grand Prince of Serbia in 1112 before being ousted by his close relatives, being succeeded by Uroš I. He was the father of four sons, Tihomir, Stracimir, Miroslav and Nemanja, and a daughter. Tihomir, the oldest, succeeded the Serbian throne in 1165 but was ousted by Nemanja, the youngest, in 1166.

== History ==
Zavida belonged to the Vukanović dynasty of Serbia (Raška). He had four sons, Tihomir (born c. 1105), Stracimir, Miroslav and Nemanja (born 1112/1113). Although there are variations in Serbian chronicles of the number and names of the brothers, historiography counts four brothers (Tihomir, Stracimir, Miroslav, Nemanja). In the Life of St. Symeon (1208), a hagiography of Stefan Nemanja written by his son Serbian archbishop Sava, and Domentian's Life of St. Symeon (1263/1264), their father was deposed (he "lost the throne due to a rebellion led by his brothers"). His family took refuge in Zeta, where the youngest, Nemanja, was born. After some years in exile, while Nemanja was still a child, the family returned to Raška. The family was closely related to the ruling family of Serbia at the time, but it is unknown exactly how. Serbian historian T. Živković (2006) concluded Uroš I was the son of Marko, and Zavida was the son of Vukan (r. 1083–1112), and Zavida was therefore the legitimate heir of Vukan. Serb-inhabited territories were under Byzantine vassalage, and the veliki župan was confirmed by the emperor.

There are several views in historiography on the succession of the Serbian throne following Vukan and Uroš I.

- According to J. Kalić, Vukan's nephew Uroš I took power after his death. Uroš I was imprisoned by his relatives, and Đorđe Bodinović freed him. Nemanja's family were relatives of the dynasties in Raška and Zeta. During unrest, Zavida and his family fled to Zeta where Nemanja was born.
- According to T. Živković, who used passages of the Chronicle of the Priest of Duklja that were largely unused in historiography, Vukan's oldest son Zavida succeeded the Serbian throne upon his death in the beginning of 1112. Zavida, as his father, relied on Byzantium; it seems that his uncle Marko (Vukan's brother) who ruled in the northern parts interfered in the succession, most likely with Hungarian support. After only some months, Zavida was forced to abdicate, being ousted by his cousins Uroš (I) and Stefan Vukan, and moved to his birth place of Ribnica in Upper Zeta. While in exile, he waited for the right moment to return to Serbia, and possibly gained Byzantine help. At the same time, there was a dynastic conflict in Duklja, which ended with Đorđe Bodinović's exile with Uroš I in Raška in 1113/1114. Byzantium was preoccupied with events in the East, and Uroš I's coup was left uncontested, perhaps as Uroš I did not put pressure on Byzantine territory. In 1120/1121, Đorđe Bodinović retook Duklja with Uroš I's help, and he tried to have one of his cousins, Gradinja, who had fled to Raška and married a daughter of Zavida, to return to Duklja and support him. Uroš I was ousted some time between 1123 and 1125 by relatives, including Gradinja, and was imprisoned. Zavida then ruled Raška as a Byzantine ally, until he was attacked by Hungarian troops sent by Stephen II of Hungary and taken prisoner, while Zavida's sons continued ruling in Raška until Đorđe freed Uroš I and overthrew them in 1126. Uroš I began his second reign with the conquest of Byzantine frontier fortress Ras in 1127, but the Byzantine emperor intervened and forced Uroš to make peace. The Serbian throne was succeeded by Uroš II in 1144 or 1145.
- According to Komatina and Komatina (2021), Zavida was ousted before 1113 by his brothers, then returned to Serbia some time between 1129 and 1134, upon the death of Uroš I, and regained the Serbian throne. It is noted that the prevalent opinion in historiography is that Zavida was not a veliki župan as he is not mentioned in Miroslav's inscription in Bijelo Polje. Zavida's sons received lands during his reign (1130/1134–1143/1146), in the 1130s. I. Komatina earlier believed Zavida's sons received territories around the time of Uroš II's revolt against Byzantium (1149), however, Nemanja's son Stefan claimed his father (born in 1113) received "a part of the fatherland" when he was adolescent. The territories of Nemanja laid in the eastern part of the Serbian lands: the four župa (Toplica, Ibar, Rasine, Reke), located between the Ibar river and the left banks of the South Morava. Although not mentioned explicitly by Stefan, it can be concluded that Miroslav received Polimlje, Stracimir received Pomoravlje, and Tihomir, the oldest, must have held lands in the most important part of Serbia, outside Ras. After Zavida's probable death in 1143 or 1146, Uroš II ruled Serbia. Zavida's sons kept their share of lands.

Zavida is mentioned in the inscription of Miroslav's endowment in Bijelo Polje, though without a title.

== Family ==
- Tihomir (c. 1105–1168 or before 1186), veliki župan of Serbia (r. 1166)
- Stracimir (c. 1107–1186), župan of West Morava, knez (t. 1166–fl. 1186)
- Miroslav (c. 1109–1198), župan of Hum, knez (t. 1166–1190)
- Stefan Nemanja (1113–1199), župan of Toplica, Ibar, Rasine, Reke (t. fl. 1166), veliki župan of Serbia (r. 1166–1196)
- A daughter who married Gradinja. The brothers are mentioned as maternal uncles of Mihailo III of Duklja.

Zavida Vukanović dynasty Born: ? Died: 1126 or 1143/1146
Regnal titles
Preceded by Vukan	Grand Prince of Serbia; 1112	Succeeded by Uroš I

== Annotations ==
1. L. Kovačević (1888) concluded that Tihomir, Stracimir, Miroslav and Nemanja were the sons of Zavida, and likely grandsons of Vukan, and that Zavida never came to rule Serbia as he was ousted by his second cousin Uroš. Polish historian J. Leśny (1989) believed Zavida was the oldest son of veliki župan Uroš I (r. 1112–1145), and therefore the legitimate heir.

== Sources ==
- Kalić, Jovanka (1982). "Српски велики жупани у борби с Византијом". Историја српског народа. Vol. 1. pp. 197–211.
- Kartalija, Nebojša (2015). "Српско-угарски односи у контексту византијске спољне политике крајем XI и почетком XII века". Konteksti, Zbornik radova. Novi Sad: 571–580 – via Academia.edu.
- Komatina, Ivana (2020). "И обнови своју дедовину и боље је утврди ‒ Стефан Немања и Стефан Првовенчани и уобличавање српске државности" (PDF). Стефан Првовенчани и његово доба. Историјски институт: 37–58.
- Komatina, Ivana; Komatina, Predrag (2021). "Family Patrimony and the Legacy of the First-Born Son. Some Examples From European Monarchies in the 11th–12th Centuries". Istraživanja. 32: 36–54.
- Kovačević, Ljubomir (1900). "Неколико питања о Стефану Немањи". Глас. LVIII. Српска краљевска академија: 1–108.
- Leśny, Jan (1989). "Stefan Zavida als Sohn von Uros I. und Vater von Stefan Nemanja: Ein Beitrag zur serbischen Prosopographie". Südost-Forschungen. 48: 37–49.
- Pirivatrić, Srđan (1991). "Прилог хронологији почетка Немањине власти" [A contribution to the chronology of the beginning of the reign of Nemanja]. Зборник радова Византолошког института. 29–30. Византолошки институт: 125–136.
- Pirivatrić, Srđan (2009). "Једна претпоставка о пореклу бугарског цара Константина Асена «Тиха»" [Une Hypothese Sur L’origine Du Tsar De Bulgarie Constantin Asen "Tich"]. Зборник радова Византолошког института. 46. Византолошки институт: 313–331 – via CEEOL.
- Pirivatrić, Srđan (2011a). "Manuel i Komnenos, „Carski san" and „Samodržci oblasti srpskog prestola"" (PDF). Зборник радова Византолошког института (48). National Library of Serbia: 89–118. doi:10.2298/zrvi1148089p. ISSN 0584-9888.
- Pirivatrić, Srđan (2011b). "О Стефану Првославу, ктитору цркве Светог Георгија у Будимљи". Ђурђеви ступови и Будимљанска епархија: зборник радова. Беране–Београд: 53–67.
- Szefliński, Błażej (2017). "O tajemniczym poprzedniku wielkiego żupana Serbii Stefana Nemanji, zwanym Tihomirem" [On the Mysterious Predecessor of Grand Župan of Serbia Stephen Nemanja called Tihomir]. Balcanica Posnaniensia Acta et studia. 23. Adam Mickiewicz University Poznan: 35–46. doi:10.14746/bp.2016.23.3. ISSN 2450-3177.
- Živković, Tibor (2006). Портрети српских владара: IX-XII век [Portraits of Serbian Rulers: IX-XII century]. Завод за уџбенике и наставна средства, Београд. ISBN 9788617137548.
- Živković, Tibor (2006b). "Синови Завидини". Зборник Матице српске за историју. 73: 7–27.
