= Zvečan Fortress =

11th-century castle in Kosovo

Coordinates: 42°54′15″N 20°50′46″E

Zveçan Zvečan Звечан
- North Mitrovica, Kosovo
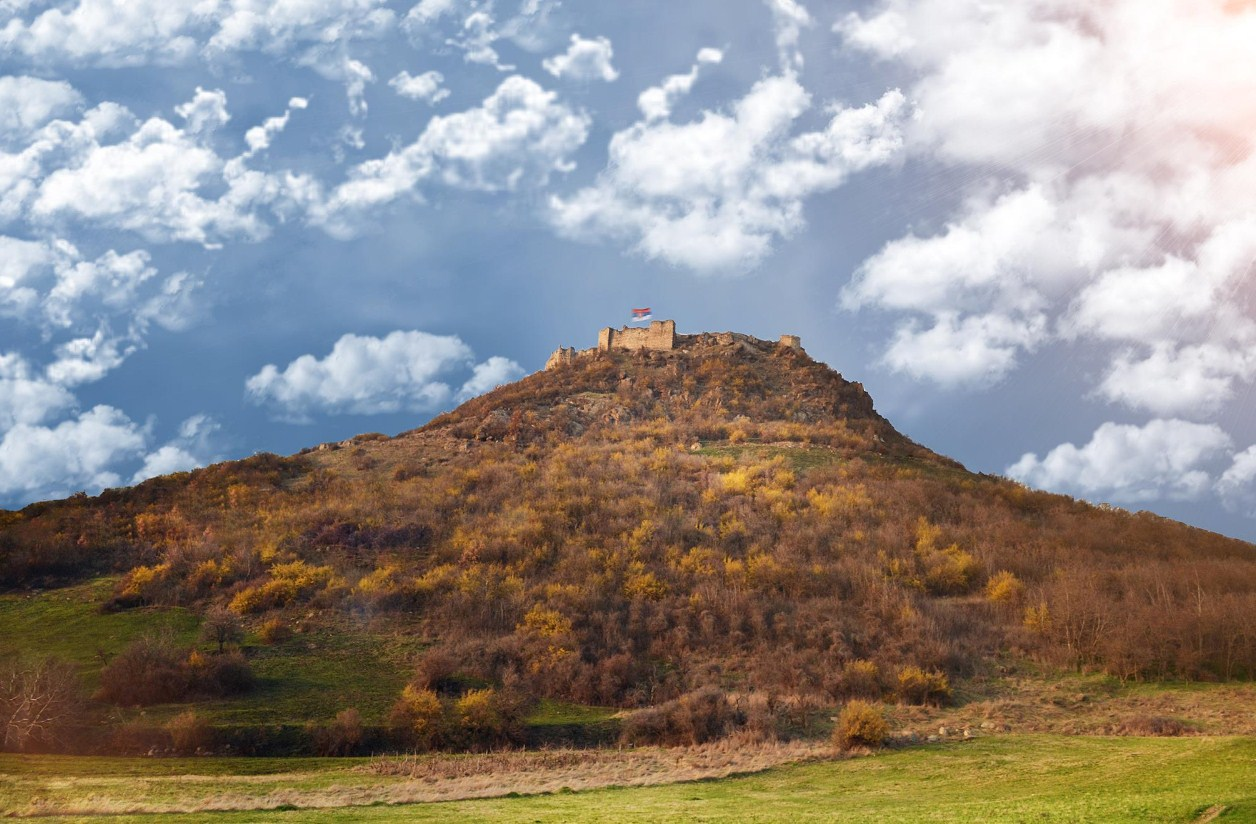
- Overview of the Zvečan fortress

Site information
- Type: Fortification

Site history
- Built: 11th century
- Built by: Vukan Vukanović
- Materials: Stone

The Fortress of Zvečan (Serbian: Тврђава Звечан / Tvrđava Zvečan, Звечански град / Zvešanski grad; Albanian: Kalaja e Zveçanit), also known as Zvečan/Zveçan medieval fortress and Fortress of Mitrovica (Albanian: Kalaja e Mitrovicës), located in the northwest of the city of North Mitrovica, in Kosovo, is an enormous castle and one of the oldest fortresses in Southeastern Europe. It was built on the top of the extinct volcano vent, overlooking the Ibar river.

== History ==
It represents one of the oldest Balkan medieval fortresses, although its exact date of construction is unknown. The underlying construction dates from the period of Classical antiquity, and it is not unlikely that the location was fortified in prehistoric times. The fortress was alluded to for the first time in 1091 during border battles between Serbs and Byzantines. As a border fort of Grand Principality of Serbia, the fortress gained importance in 1093, when the Serbian ruler Vukan, launched his conquest of the Kosovo region (then part of the Byzantine Empire) from there. Part of the fortress was designated as one of the courts of the Serbian House of Nemanjić.

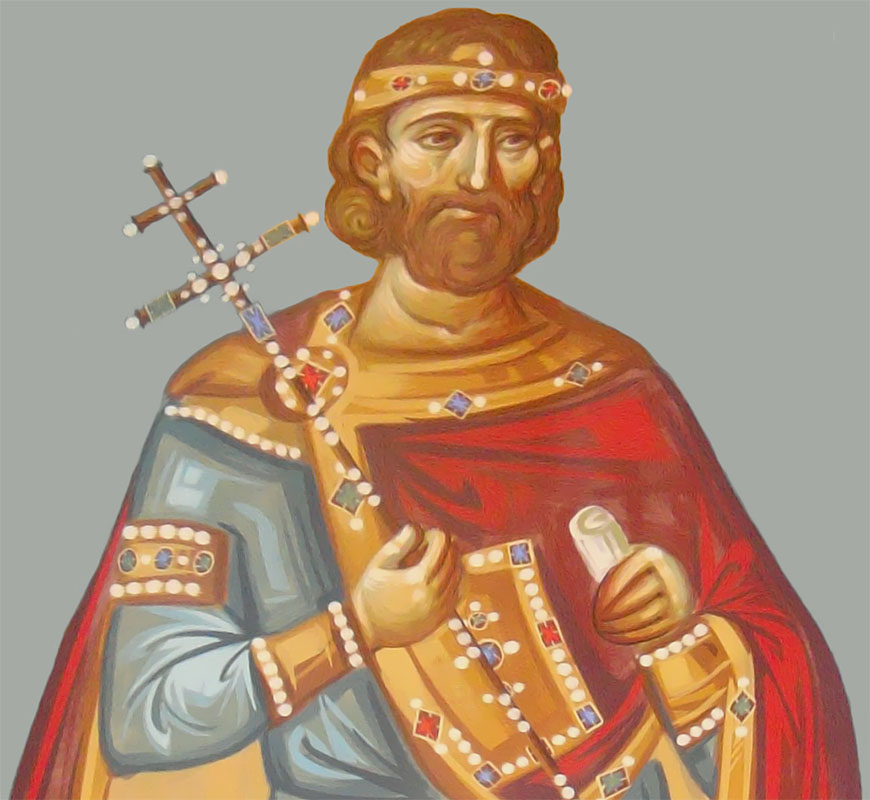
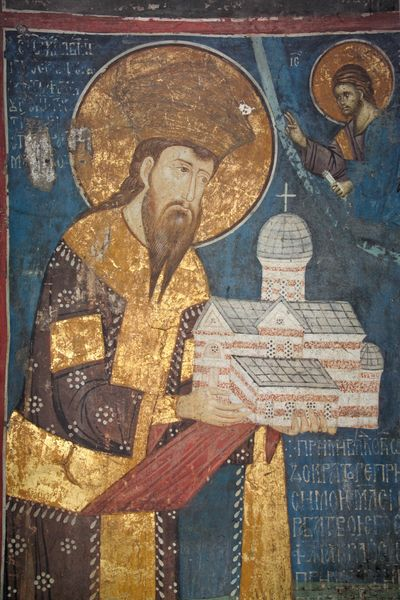
Left: Vukan, Grand Prince of Serbia, launched his conquest of Byzantine territories from the Zvečan Fortress
Right: Stefan Dečanski, King of Serbia, died in Zvečan Fortress

In the 12th century, the fort would play a pivotal role in the struggle of expanding the Serbian state under the Nemanjić dynasty.

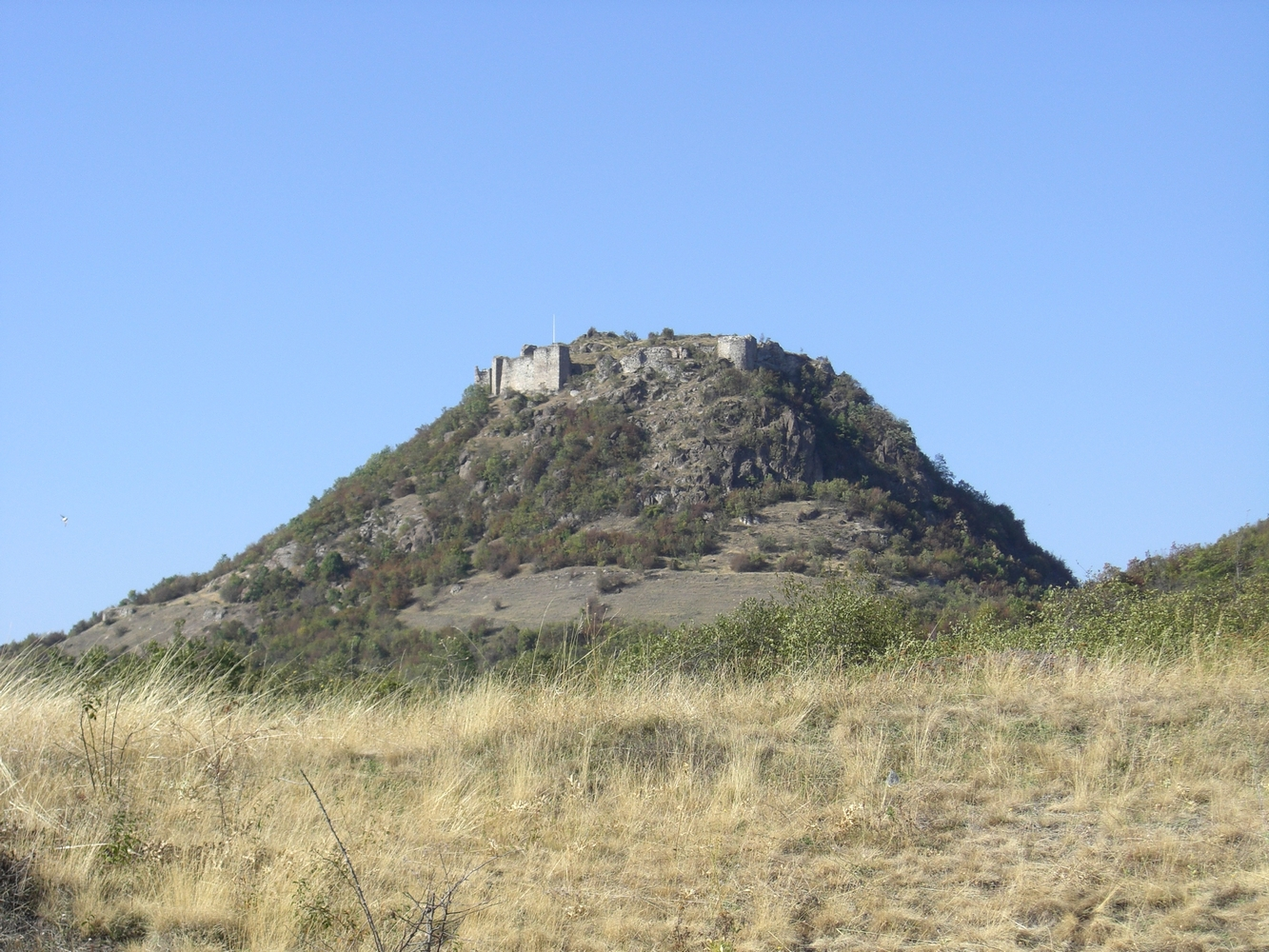
View of the Zvečan Fortress

Thick and high walls of Zvečan fortress at the House of Nemanjić’s time, served not only for protection against the enemy’s assaults but also as a shelter for the merchants from Dubrovnik as well as a dungeon for the overthrown rulers of the Nemanjić’s lineage. Thus Konstantin Nemanić, Stefan Dečanski’s stepbrother, was buried here in 1322.

It was the place where Stefan Uroš III was imprisoned and died in 1331. For some time, the ruler of Zvečan was Grand Prince Lazar’s son-in-law, the chieftain Musa, at the time of Czar Uroš. By the end of 14th century Zvečan was under the rule of Vuk Branković. In 1389, it was captured by the Ottoman Turks after the Battle of Kosovo, and it remained an active military site well into the 18th century, after which it was abandoned.

Zvečan finally fell into Turkish power in 1455, when the Turkish population colonized these areas. Among whom Feriz Qefali was mentioned to have an authorization from the Sultan and Pasha from Skopje to make trading connections with Dubrovnik. By its subjection to Turkish rule, Zvečan lost its importance as a military fort and the authors of the travel books from the 16th century, Benedicte Kuripešić and Evliya Çelebi referred to its as a deserted town on the hill to the north of Mitrovicë. In 1660, Çelebi describes it as "consisting of 300 houses with tiled roofs, a congregational mosque, a khan, a bathhouse and several fine shops".

Under Turkish-Ottoman rule, Zvečan was neglected and was in the possession of the Bosnian Vilayet. Eventually, Mitrovica became a kadiluk (district) of the Bosnian vilayet and Zvečan, along with Mitrovicë, remained in that administrative until 1877, and it, as it too was a part of Mitrovica, belonged to the Pristina region (Sandžak) until the region's annexation by the Kingdom of Serbia in the First Balkan War, in 1912.

From 1912-45, little was done on the research and restoration of Zvečan; it was only after 1945 when many archeological excavations were carried out in the town which was put under the protection of the state. There is a need for complete reconstruction of the fortress in order to prevent it from further ruining.

== See also ==
- List of castles in Kosovo

== Sources ==
- Božović, Ružica (2015). "Medieval Town-Fortress of Zvecan" (PDF). Facta Universitatis - Series: Architecture and Civil Engineering. 13 (2): 137–153. doi:10.2298/FUACE15020137B (inactive 20 February 2026).
