= Ana (wife of Uroš I) =

Grand Princess of Serbia

Grand Princess of Serbia
- Tenure: ca. 1112–1145
- Born: 11th century
- Died: after 1115
- Spouse: Uroš I of Serbia
- Issue: Uroš II; Beloš; Desa; Jelena; Marija
- House: Possibly Diogenes

Ana (Serbian: Ана) was the consort of Uroš I, Grand Prince of Serbia (r. 1112–1145). Her identity is deemed unknown, but modern studies tend to identify her as a Byzantine princess. Since Uroš I had several children, including sons Uroš II, Beloš and Desa, and also daughters Helena of Serbia, Queen of Hungary and Marija, Duchess of Znojmo, Ana is considered as their mother.

Serbian chronicles mention Ana (or Katarina) as a French princess and the wife of Beli Uroš ("White Uroš"), that is, Uroš I. The Hilandar Chronicle mentions Ana as the "daughter of the French king". This is however not supported by any Latin source. Johann Christian von Engel (1801) identified her as a French princess. Moriz Wertner, who studied the geneaology of the Serbian dynasty, noted the Hilandar Chronicle's mention, "However, we find neither an Anna nor any other princess among the Capetians that married an Uroš of Serbia". Wertner further noted that Italian chronicler Pietro Ranzano, who served at Hungarian court (1488–1490) recorded in his "Epitome rerum Hungarorum" that the (unnamed) mother of Hungarian queen Helena of Serbia was a niece by sister to the (unnamed) Byzantine emperor (Latin: Eius uxor matrona singulari prudentia Helena dicta est, quam perhibent neptem ex sorore fuisse Constantinopolitani imperatoris). It has been suggested that Anna was a relative to Romanos IV Diogenes and thus possibly a member of the Diogenes dynasty. Hungarian historian S. Vajay concluded that this Anna received her name from another queen Anna, as per Byzantine tradition, and that it could only be Anna Dalassena, the mother of Alexios I Komnenos, and that therefore, the wife of Uroš was a daughter of one of Alexios' three sisters. Buonocore de Widman's geneaology suggested Anna being the daughter of Anna Doukaina and Georgios Palaiologos, but this was refuted by Kerbl, as impossible due to protocol. Hungarian historian C. Farkas (2016) noted the suggestion that Anna, the wife of Uroš, was a member of the Diogenes, and pointed to the unreliability of the Hilandar Chronicle which could be dated to the 16th century.

It is not recorded when Anna married Uroš I, the Serbian Grand Prince, who reigned from ca. 1112 to 1145. It was assumed that the marriage took place during or after Uroš's political captivity in Byzantium (1094), where he had been sent as a hostage by his uncle, Grand Prince Vukan of Serbia, following the capture of Lipljan in 1094 by the troops of Alexios I Komnenos. Presumably, the two married while Uroš was a political hostage at Byzantium sent after 1094 by his uncle, Serbian ruler Vukan. Uroš had at least five children:

- Uroš II (1115–1162), Grand Prince of Serbia (r. 1145–1162)
- Beloš (fl. 1129–1163), regent of Géza II (1141–1146), Palatine of Hungary (t. 1146–1157), Ban of Slavonia (t. 1146–1157, 1163)
- Desa (fl. 1129–1165), Grand Prince of Serbia as usurper (r. 1153–1155)
- Jelena (1110–1161), Queen consort of Hungary (r. 1131–1141), regent of Géza II (1141–1146)
- Marija (fl. 1134–d. 1189), Duchess of Znojmo

Some researchers have proposed that Zavida was also their son, however, historiography treats Vukan as his father.

== Sources ==
- Engel, Johann Christian (1801). Geschichte des Ungrischen Reichs und seiner Nebenländer, III: Geschichte von Serwien und Bosnien. Halle: Gebauer.
- Farkas, Csaba (2016). "A basileus unokahúga" (PDF). Fons: Forráskutatás és Történeti Segédtudományok. 23: 87–118.
- Kulcsár, Petrus, ed. (1977). Pietro Ranzano: Epithoma rerum Hungararum id est annalium omnium temporum, liber primus et sexagesimus. Budapest: Akadémiai Kiadó.
- Leśny, Jan (1989). "Stefan Zavida als Sohn von Uros I. und Vater von Stefan Nemanja: Ein Beitrag zur serbischen Prosopographie". Südost-Forschungen. 48: 37–49.
- Stojanović, Lj. (1927). Стари српски родослови и летописи [Old Serbian genealogies and annals] (in Serbian). Beograd: Српска Краљевска академија.
- Vajay, Szabolcs (1979). "Byzantinische Prinzessinnen in Ungarn" (PDF). Ungarn-Jahrbuch. 10: 15–28.
- Wertner, Moriz (1891a). "Die fürstlichen Nemanjiden: Beiträge zur Kenntniss der ungarisch-serbischen Beziehungen". Ungarische Revue. 11: 536–571.
- Wertner, Mór (1891b). A középkori délszláv uralkodók genealogiai története. Temesvár: Nyomatott a Csanád-egyházmegyei könyvsajtón.
- Živković, Tibor (2006). Портрети српских владара: IX-XII век [Portraits of Serbian Rulers: IX-XII century]. Завод за уџбенике и наставна средства, Београд. ISBN 9788617137548.

Royal titles
Unknown	Grand Princess consort of Serbia; 1112–1145	Unknown Title next held by Anastasia of Serbia
