= Stefan Vukan =

Serbian prince

- Born: 1084–1093
- Dynasty: (Vukanović)
- Father: Marko
- Religion: Christianity

Stefan Vukan (Serbian: Стефан Вукан) was a Serbian prince, the son of župan (count) Marko (fl. 1083–1124). He is mentioned alongside his brother Uroš as hostages to Byzantium following a revolt led by their uncle veliki župan Vukan (r. 1083–1112).

== History ==
King Constantine Bodin of Duklja conquered the Byzantine territories of Serbia ("Raška") and Bosnia in 1083–1084, and appointed Vukan, Marko, and Stefan, his vassals there. Vukan and Marko were most likely brothers, and the LPD claims how "two župans of his [Bodin's] court, Vukan and Marko, swore that they and their sons would be rightful vassal of king Bodin and his sons and heirs". The territory of Vukan and Marko included parts of the former Catepanate of Ras and Theme of Serbia. Marko's territory most likely included Mačva, northeastern Bosnia and the lower Drina. Vukan's territory included what is today southwestern Serbia (including Raška), northern and western Metohija, and eastern Montenegro. In Serbia ("Raška"), Vukan and Marko founded a new dynasty.

In 1093–1094, Vukan started an offensive against the Byzantine Empire to expand to the south and southeast, which ended with a peace treaty where Vukan sent his two nephews (Marko's sons) Uroš and Stefan Vukan (or Stefan and Vukan), along with 20 notables, as security. The fact that his sons were given as hostages means that Marko actively participated in the war. According to T. Živković (2006), Marko's wife was likely Hungarian, judging by the name of his son Uroš (derived from ur, "prince", equivalent of Serbian Prvoslav and Latinized version Primislav), while according to Ž. Veljković (2009) the name was rather an Old Serbian hypocoristic of Uro, itself a hypocoristic of three given names of Dalmatian origin. Marko must have very early on entered marital relations with an influential Hungarian family. T. Živković dates the marriage to 1084/1085.

Vukan's heir Zavida was ousted in 1112 by Marko's sons Uroš and Stefan Vukan (or Stefan and Vukan), most likely with Hungarian help. This shows that Marko had good relations with the Hungarian elite. Marko, as comes is mentioned in two Hungarian charters dating to 1111 and 1124 among counts. According to T. Živković (2006), Zavida was reinstated in 1123, having imprisoned Uroš I, only to be captured during the incursion of Stephen II of Hungary into Serbia in 1126, while according to Komatina (2021), Zavida was ousted before 1113, then returned to Serbia some time between 1129 and 1134, upon the death of Uroš I, and regained the Serbian throne.

Stefan Vukan is mentioned in Anna Komnene's Alexiad (1148), but is not found by name in other contemporary Byzantine accounts. Panta Srećković (1884) believed that Stefan Vukan was "a descendant of župan Bela of Trebinje; the son of veliki župan Marko; nephew of veliki župan Vukan; brother of veliki župan Uroš I; maternal grandchild of King Bodin; father-in-law of King Gradinja; and for some time the veliki župan of Raška", in 1123–1124. I. Kukuljević believed Stefan Vukan was the same as Vakhin of the Battle of Tara (1150). S. Mandić (1986) theorized that Komnene dubbed Vukan a stephanos (crowned) as she had heard stories that he had been a župan or veliki župan in Serbia ("Raška"). The name Vukan is next found in the first-born son of Stefan Nemanja, Vukan Nemanjić.

== Sources ==
- Kartalija, Nebojša (2015). "Српско-угарски односи у контексту византијске спољне политике крајем XI и почетком XII века". Konteksti, Zbornik radova. Novi Sad: 571–580 – via Academia.edu.
- Komatina, Ivana; Komatina, Predrag (2021). "Family Patrimony and the Legacy of the First-Born Son. Some Examples From European Monarchies in the 11th–12th Centuries". Istraživanja. 32: 36–54.
- Kovačević, Ljubomir (1900). "Неколико питања о Стефану Немањи". Глас. LVIII. Српска краљевска академија: 1–108.
- Mandić, Svetislav (1986). Velika gospoda sve srpske zemlje i drugi prosopografski prilozi. Srpska književna zadruga. ISBN 978-86-379-0012-2.
- Živković, Tibor (2006). Портрети српских владара: IX-XII век [Portraits of Serbian Rulers: IX-XII century]. Завод за уџбенике и наставна средства, Београд. ISBN 9788617137548.
- Živković, Tibor (2005). "Jedna hipoteza o poreklu velikog župana Uroša I" (PDF). Историјски часопис. 52. Историјски институт: 9–22.
- Živković, Tibor (2006b). "Синови Завидини". Зборник Матице српске за историју. 73: 7–27.
