= Petrislav =

Petrislav may refer to:

- Petrislav of Diokleia
- Petrislav of Rascia
