= Stracimir =

Stracimir is an archaic masculine Serbian name. Notable people with the name include:

- Stracimir Zavidović, 12th-century Serbian noble that ruled Duklja
- Stracimir Balšić, 14th-century Serbian noble that ruled Zeta
