= Uroš I, Grand Prince of Serbia =

Uroš I

Grand Prince of Serbia
- Reign: 1112–1145
- Predecessor: Vukan
- Successor: Uroš II
- Born: before 1083
- Spouse: Anna Diogenissa
- Issue: Uroš II, Desa, Beloš, Helena, Maria, possibly Zavida
- House: Vukanović
- Father: Marko
- Religion: Eastern Orthodoxy

Uroš I (Serbian Cyrillic: Урош I, Greek: Ούρεσις) was the Grand Prince (Veliki Župan) of the Grand Principality of Serbia from about 1112 to 1145.

== Biography ==
=== Origin ===
Uroš I was the son of Marko, who was a son of Petrislav of Rascia and brother of Grand Prince Vukan, who had sworn an oath of loyalty to Constantine Bodin, the Grand Prince of Duklja, becoming his vassals. Marko, as the subordinate ruler, would have had his appanage in lands north of Raška, bordering the Kingdom of Hungary. The name Uroš itself, is most likely derived from the Hungarian word úr meaning "dominus" or "princeps", which is translated into the Slavic name 'Prvoslav', or 'Primislav', as seen in the case of Uroš II in Slavic sources. It is a possibility that Marko married a Hungarian wife.

=== War with Byzantium ===
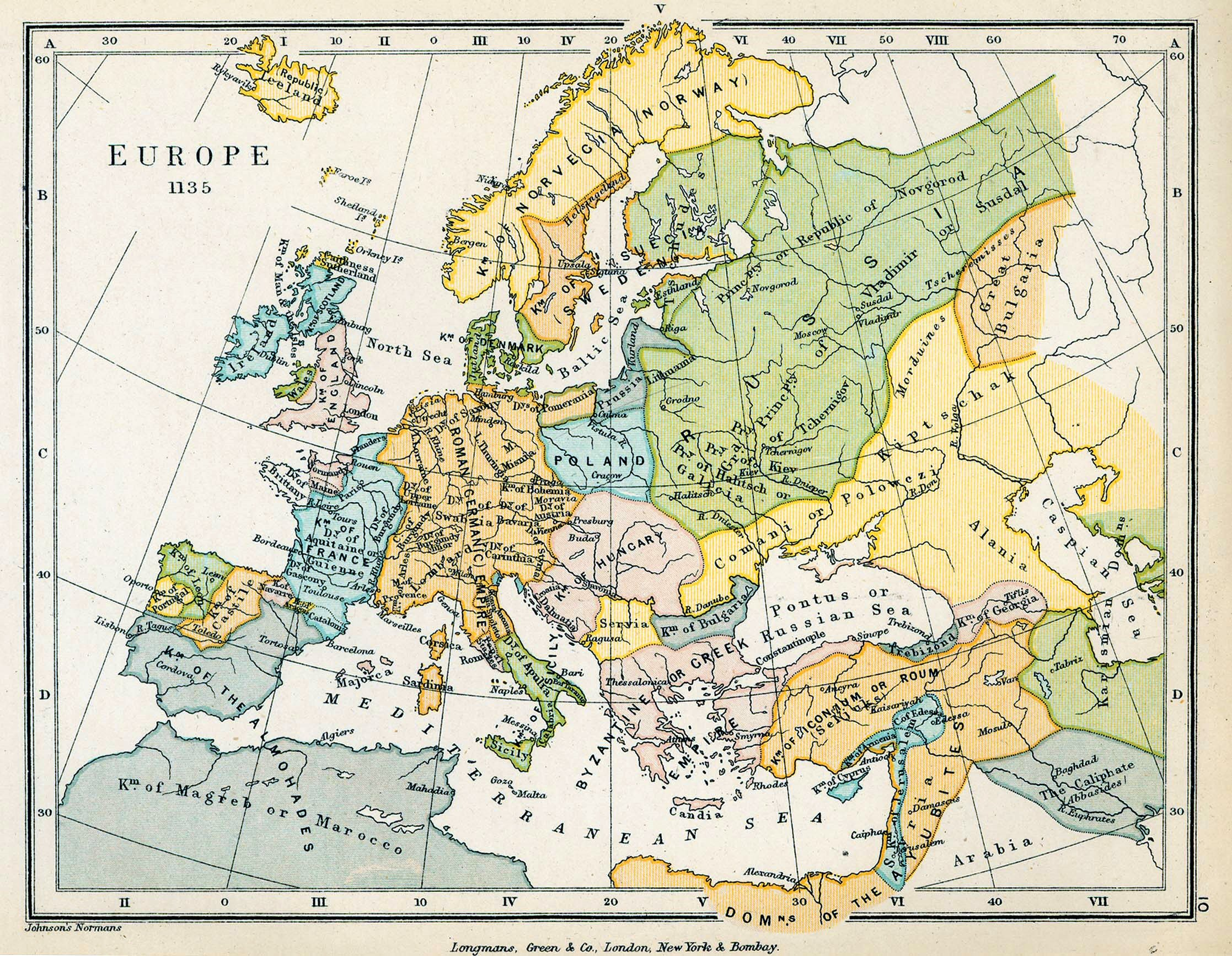
Europe, 1135

In 1092, the Serb Army defeated the Byzantine Army led by the governor of Durazzo, sent by Alexius Comnenus. In 1093, Alexius himself led a larger Byzantine Army and marched towards Raška (i.e. Serbia), but Vukan heard of this and immediately sought peace, which Alexius quickly accepted as new problems arose in the east where the Cumans penetrated as far as Adrianople. As soon as the Emperor had departed, Vukan broke the treaty, conquering the Vardar and taking the cities of Vranje, Skoplje and Tetovo. In 1094 or 1095, the Emperor once again marched to the Serbs, capturing Lipljan. This time Vukan met with him in his tent and gave him some twenty hostages, including Uroš I and Stefan Vukan, as an oath of peace. Uroš was first mentioned in the contemporary Alexiad of Anna Komnene, a written account of the reign of her father Byzantine emperor Alexios I Komnenos.

Following the death of Vukan in 1112, Uroš succeeded as Grand Prince.

=== Civil war in Duklja ===
In 1113 or 1114, the Byzantine Army based in Durazzo invaded Duklja and captured the capital of Scutari. Duklja at the time was ruled by Prince Đorđe of Duklja (r. 1118), the son of Constantine Bodin. The Byzantines installed Grubeša Branislavljević after 1118, banishing Đorđe to Raška. Đorđe claimed protection of Uroš, and in the 1125 the two led an army against Grubeša, meeting in the Battle of Antivari. Grubeša was killed and Đorđe retained his realm, although not all of it. Small parts were ruled by cousins, among them the three brothers of Grubeša, who would soon quarrel with Đorđe. The Byzantines again invaded the coastlands of Duklja, giving nominal rule to Gradinja, resulting in a guerilla war in the woods. The second expedition captured Đorđe. He was taken to Constantinople where he died. Gradinja strengthened the ties with Serbia.

== Diplomacy ==
In around 1130, he married his daughter, Jelena, to King Béla II of Hungary. Bela II, being blind, relied entirely on Jelena who acted as a co-ruler. Jelena is sourced as having decided to massacre 68 aristocrats at the Arad assembly, who had persuaded Coloman to blind her husband.

In 1137, Ladislaus II, the son of Béla II and Jelena, became the titular Ban of Bosnia.

When Bela II died on 13 February 1141, the eldest son Géza II ascended the throne, still a child. Therefore, Helena and her brother Beloš Vukanović, whom she had invited to the court, governed the Kingdom of Hungary until September 1146 when he came of age.

Beloš was the Ban of Croatia 1142-1158, under the Hungarian crown, and held the comes palatinus (Count palatine), the highest court title of the Kingdom.

== Family ==
Uroš was married to Anna Diogenissa. They had the following issue:

- Uroš II, Grand Prince of Serbia
- Desa — Duke of Serbian Primorje, co-ruled Serbia with Uroš II
- Beloš — Ban of Croatia and briefly Prince of Serbia
- Helena, Queen of Hungary (d. after 1146), married King Béla II of Hungary
- Maria of Serbia, Duchess of Znojmo

and possibly

- Zavida - Duke of Zahumlje. In a Zadar act, Beloš's brother is named "Stefan"; that name is found in the sons of Zavida.

Maria	Helena

== See also ==
- List of Serbian monarchs

Regnal titles
Preceded by Vukan	Grand Prince of Serbia; 1112–1145	Succeeded by Uroš II

== Notes ==
1. Genealogy: See, primary source Anna Comnene, Fine views Vukan as the father
2. Reign: Vukan died in 1112, as Stefan Nemanja was born in 1113, Fine puts the time of Vukan's death in ca 1122. Fine puts Uroš II's reign "by 1145 to 1162".

== Sources ==
- Ćirković, Sima (2004). The Serbs. Malden: Blackwell Publishing. ISBN 9781405142915.
- Kalić, Jovanka (2016). "Grand Župan Uroš II of Rascia". Balcanica. 47: 75–96.
- Fine, John V. A. Jr. (1991) [1983]. The Early Medieval Balkans: A Critical Survey from the Sixth to the Late Twelfth Century. Ann Arbor: University of Michigan Press. ISBN 0-472-08149-7.
- Anna Comnena, The Alexiad, translated by Elizabeth A. Dawes in 1928
- John Kinnamos, The Deeds of John and Manuel Comnenus, trans. C.M. Brand (New York, 1976). ISBN 0-231-04080-6
- Imperii Graeci Historia, ed. Hieronymus Wolf, 1557, in Greek with parallel Latin translation. (PDF of 1593 reprint)
- Андрија Веселиновић, Радош Љушић - Српске династије, Нови Сад - Београд 2001, 32.
- Живковић, Тибор (2006). Портрети српских владара: IX-XII век (Portraits of Serbian Rulers: IX-XII Century). Београд: Завод за уџбенике и наставна средства. ISBN 9788617137548.
- Živković Tibor, 2005, br. 52, str. 9-22, Jedna hipoteza o poreklu velikog župana Uroša I
