= Desa, Grand Prince of Serbia =

Desa

Grand Prince of Serbia
- Reign: c. 1155
- Predecessor: Uroš II
- Successor: Uroš II

Grand Prince of Serbia
- Reign: 1162–1166
- Predecessor: Beloš
- Successor: Tihomir
- House: Vukanović
- Father: Uroš I
- Mother: Anna

Desa (Serbian Cyrillic: Деса) was the Grand Prince of Serbia from 1162 to 1166. He was one of several sons of grand prince Uroš I (d. 1145). Sometime between 1153 and 1155, Desa tried to depose his brother, the ruling grand prince Uroš II, but failed to establish himself as a new ruler. Only later, after the abdication of their other brother, the next grand prince Beloš c. 1162, Desa became the new ruler of Serbia. He tried to challenge the Byzantine suzerainty over Serbia, but was deposed by emperor Manuel I Komnenos. Before he became the grand prince, Desa ruled as prince of Duklja, Travunija and Zahumlje, ca. from 1149 to 1162.

== Biography ==
Desa was the youngest of three sons of Uroš I, the Grand Prince of Serbia from c. 1112 to 1145. His mother was Anna, a Byzantine noblewoman. The eldest son Uroš II succeeded their father in 1145. Their sister, Helena, married Béla II of Hungary (r. 1131–41). Upon the death of Béla II, Helena and the middle son Beloš became regents of Hungary. Desa was an uncle to three kings of Hungary and Croatia.

In ca. 1148, the political situation in the Balkans was divided by two sides, one being the alliance of the Byzantines and Venice, the other the Normans and Hungarians. The Normans were sure of the danger that the battlefield would move from the Balkans to their area in Italy. Emperor Manuel I Komnenos also allied himself with the Germans after defeating the Cumans in 1148. The Serbs, Hungarians, and Normans exchanged envoys, as it was in the interest of the Normans to stop Manuel's plans to recover Italy.

The Serbs under brothers Uroš II and Desa revolted against the Byzantines, when Manuel was in Avlona planning an offensive across the Adriatic. This revolt posed danger to the Emperor if he would attack Italy, as the Serbs could strike at the Adriatic bases. The Serbs next undertook an offensive against Radoslav of Duklja, who was a loyal Byzantine vassal. Radoslav was pushed to the southwestern corner of Duklja, to Kotor, and retained only the coastal area, with the brothers holding much of inland Duklja and Trebinje, i.e. over two thirds of Duklja. Radoslav sought help from the Emperor, who sent aid from Durazzo. At this moment, the Chronicle of the Priest of Duklja ends, presumably because the author of the original text had died. A major war was about to erupt in the Balkans; Uroš II and Desa, in light of Byzantine retaliation, sought aid from their brother Beloš, the count palatine of Hungary. By 1150, Hungarian troops played an active role in Serbia.

Desa's brother Uroš II ruled alone from 1140 until the battle at the Tara river against Emperor Manuel in 1150, when the Byzantines defeated the Serbs and Hungarians. Uroš II was spared and Desa was instated as co-ruler along with Uroš. He is mentioned in Venetian charters from 1150 as a Prince of Duklja, Travunija and Zahumlje, and again in 1151. In 1153 a dispute between the two brothers resulted in Desa and the Serbian court ousting Uroš II. Emperor Manuel I intervened, calling Desa as "the usurper, false ruler of Dalmatia" and re-instated Uroš II in 1155, deposing Desa but giving him region of "Dendra, a prosperous and populous area near Niš". In early 1160s, Uroš II was deposed being replaced by Beloš who instead soon resigned in favor of Desa, with Manuel I's approval, but gave away Dendra to the Byzantines.

Desa tried to engage in diplomacy with Hungarian king Frederick, calling him as the "lord" and attacked Dendra. In the summer of 1165, Manuel I sent an army to pursuit Desa. Desa was granted a safe meeting with Manuel I and was escorted by a bodyguard. Desa gave oaths to Manuel I in a public humiliation after being examined in Constantinople on his diplomacy with Hungary. Manuel put Tihomir on the throne in 1166.

== Sources ==
- Bataković, Dušan T., ed. (2005). Histoire du peuple serbe [History of the Serbian People] (in French). Lausanne: L’Age d’Homme.
- Brand, Charles M., ed. (1976). John Kinnamos: Deeds of John and Manuel Comnenus. New York: Columbia University Press.
- Browning, Robert (1961). "A new Source on Byzantine-Hungarian relations in the twelfth century: The inaugural lecture of Michael ὁ τοῦ ̓Αγχιάλου ὡς ὕπατος τῶν φιλοσόφων". Balkan Studies. 2 (2): 173–214. Archived from the original on 2022-10-16.
- Ćirković, Sima (2004). The Serbs. Malden: Blackwell Publishing.
- Curta, Florin (2019). Eastern Europe in the Middle Ages (500-1300). Leiden and Boston: Brill.
- Engel, Pál (2001). The Realm of St. Stephen: A History of Medieval Hungary, 895-1526. London & New York: I.B.Tauris.
- Fine, John Van Antwerp Jr. (1991) [1983]. The Early Medieval Balkans: A Critical Survey from the Sixth to the Late Twelfth Century. Ann Arbor, Michigan: University of Michigan Press.
- Fine, John Van Antwerp Jr. (1994) [1987]. The Late Medieval Balkans: A Critical Survey from the Late Twelfth Century to the Ottoman Conquest. Ann Arbor, Michigan: University of Michigan Press.
- Kalić, Jovanka (1977). "Zur Bezeichnung Raška (Rascien) für den serbischen Staat bis zur mitte des 12. Jahrhunderts". Balcanoslavica. 5 (1976): 53–61.
- Kalić, Jovanka (1995). "Rascia - The Nucleus of the Medieval Serbian State". The Serbian Question in the Balkans. Belgrade: Faculty of Geography. pp. 147–155.
- Kalić, Jovanka (2016). "Grand Župan Uroš II of Rascia". Balcanica. 47: 75–96.
- Leśny, Jan (1989). "Stefan Zavida als Sohn von Uros I. und Vater von Stefan Nemanja: Ein Beitrag zur serbischen Prosopographie". Südost-Forschungen. 48: 37–49.
- Stephenson, Paul (2000). Byzantium's Balkan Frontier: A Political Study of the Northern Balkans, 900–1204. Cambridge: Cambridge University Press.
- Živković, Tibor (2008). Forging unity: The South Slavs between East and West 550-1150. Belgrade: The Institute of History.

Desa Vukanović dynasty
Preceded by Beloš	Grand Prince of Serbia ca. 1162–1165	Succeeded by Tihomir
Preceded by Radoslav	Prince of Duklja ca. 1149–1162	Succeeded by Mihailo III as Prince of Duklja
Preceded by Radoslav	Prince of Duklja ca. 1149–1162	Succeeded by Grdeša as Župan of Trebinje
