= Grand Principality of Serbia =

Medieval state in Southeastern Europe (1091–1217)

Grand Principality of Serbia Великожупанска Србија Velikožupanska Srbija
- 1091–1217
- Seal of Grand Prince Stefan Nemanja

- Grand Principality of Sebia (in red) in 1184
- Status: Vassal state of the Byzantine Empire
- Capital: Ras; Niš
- Common languages: Old Serbian
- Religion: Eastern Orthodoxy (majority); Bogomilism (minority)
- Demonyms: Serbian, Serb
- Grand Prince
  - 1083–1112: Vukan
  - 1166–1196: Stefan Nemanja
  - 1196–1202 1204–1228: Stefan Nemanjić (Grand Prince↑King)
  - 1202–1204: Vukan Nemanjić
- Historical era: Middle Ages
  - Established: 1091
  - Disestablished: 1217
Preceded by
Byzantine Empire under the Komnenos dynasty
Duklja
Principality of Serbia
Succeeded by
Kingdom of Serbia

The Grand Principality of Serbia (Serbian: Великожупанска Србија / Velikožupanska Srbija), also known by the anachronistic exonym Rascia (Serbian: Рашка / Raška), was a medieval Serbian state that existed from the second half of the 11th century up until 1217, when it was transformed into the Kingdom of Serbia. After the Grand Principality of Serbia emerged, it gradually expanded during the 12th century, encompassing various neighbouring regions, including territories of Raška (Serbian Cyrillic: Рашка; Latin: Rascia), modern Montenegro, Herzegovina, and southern Dalmatia. It was founded by Grand Prince Vukan, who initially served as the regional governor of the principality (c. 1082), appointed by King Constantine Bodin. During the Byzantine–Serbian wars (c. 1090), Vukan gained prominence and became a self-governing ruler in the inner Serbian regions. He founded the Vukanović dynasty, which ruled the grand principality. Through diplomatic ties with the Kingdom of Hungary, Vukan's successors managed to retain their self-governance, while also recognizing the supreme overlordship of the Byzantine Empire, up to 1180. Grand Prince Stefan Nemanja (r. 1166–1196) gained full independence and united almost all Serbian lands. His son, Grand Prince Stefan was crowned King of Serbia in 1217, while his younger son Saint Sava became the first Archbishop of Serbs, in 1219.

== Background ==
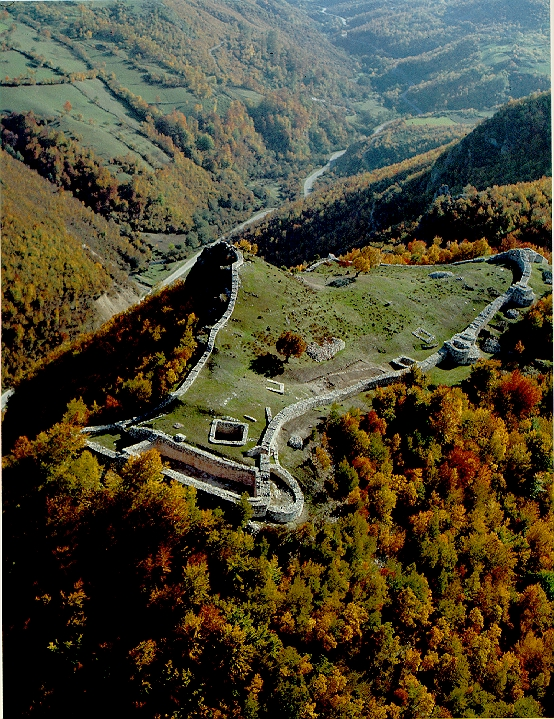
Ruins of the medieval fortress of Ras, the capital of Grand Principality of Serbia since mid-12th century

According to the De Administrando Imperio (DAI), the Serbs settled the Balkans under the protection of the Byzantine Emperor Heraclius (r. 610–641) and were ruled by a dynasty known in historiography as the Vlastimirović dynasty. Slavs had begun settling in the region in the early 6th century, after raiding deep into the Empire. They settled "baptized Serbia", which included Bosnia, and the maritime lands (Pomorje) of Travunija, Zahumlje and Paganija, while maritime Duklja was held by the Byzantines, it was presumably settled with Serbs as well. All of the maritime lands bordered "baptized Serbia" to the north. In the mid-9th century, the hitherto peaceful neighbour of Bulgaria invaded but was defeated in war. Serbia was Christianized in ca. 870, although missions had been made during Heraclius' reign. In the following decades, members of the dynasty fought succession wars, and Serbia became a matter of Byzantine-Bulgarian rivalry. The written information regarding the dynasty ends with the DAI and Prince Časlav's death (ca. 950), after which the realm crumbled into pieces. The Byzantines established a short-lived catepanate at Ras, with military governorship ending soon thereafter with the Byzantine conquest of Bulgaria, and was re-established only ca. 1018 with the short-lived Theme of Sirmium.

Meanwhile, Duklja emerged as the dominant Serbian principality, that gradually also included Travunija, Zahumlje, Bosnia and Serbia proper. Initially a vassal of the Byzantine Empire, Stefan Vojislav (fl. 1034–1043) rose and managed to take over the territories of the earlier Serbian principality, founding the Vojislavljević dynasty. Between 1043 and 1080, under Mihailo Vojislavljević (r. 1050–1081), and his son, Constantine Bodin (r. 1081–1101), Duklja saw its apogee. Mihailo was given the nominal title King of Slavs by the Pope after having left the Byzantine camp and supported a Slavic uprising in the Balkans, in which his son Bodin played a central part. Having incorporated the Serbian hinterland and installed vassal rulers there, it emerged as the most powerful Serb polity, seen in the titles used by its rulers ("Prince of Serbia", "of Serbs"). However, its rise was short-lived, as Bodin was defeated by the Byzantines and imprisoned; pushed to the background, his relative and vassal Vukan became independent in Serbia, which continued the fight against the Byzantines while Duklja was struck with civil wars.

== History ==
In 1091 or 1092, Vukan became independent, taking the title of Grand Prince (veliki župan). Subordinate to him were local counts (titled župan), who seem to have been more or less autonomous in the internal affairs of their counties, but who obliged loyalty, and warfare support. It seems that the counts were hereditary holders, holding their land before Duklja annexed Serbia. Vukan began raiding Byzantine territory in the vicinity of Kosovo in ca. 1090, the Byzantines initially being unable to take counter-measures as they faced invading Pechenegs.

After defeating the Pechenegs, Alexios I Komnenos sent an army with the strategos of Dyrrhachium, which was defeated by Vukan in 1092. Alexios then mobilized a much larger army, led by himself, and marched onto Serbia; Vukan sent envoys, seeking peace, which Alexios quickly accepted as problems arose at home with Cumans plundering as far as Adrianople. Immediately after the Emperor's departure, Vukan broke the treaty and began to expand along the Vardar, obtaining much booty and taking the cities of Vranje, Skopje and Tetovo. In 1094 or 1095, Alexios marched out and met Vukan, who offered peace and gave twenty hostages including his cousin Uroš and son Stefan (it was usual for relatives of rulers to stay at the Imperial court as hostages of peace). At this time, Vukan acted entirely on his own, no longer a vassal of Duklja, which because of its civil war did not involve itself in the conflicts.

Following Bodin's death in 1101, Vukan took advantage of the dynastic civil wars in Duklja, and allied with Kočapar, with whom he invaded Duklja in 1102. Kočapar's reign was short-lived, as he fell in battle during a conflict with Zahumlje; Vukan installed another member of the dynasty, Vladimir, to whom he married his daughter. Upon spreading his influence in Duklja, Vukan invaded Byzantium once more in the spring of 1106, taking advantage of the Norman campaign, defeating co-emperor John II Komnenos, but then sent hostages in return for peace in November. There is no written record of Vukan after this war, and he is believed to have died in ca. 1112, succeeded by his cousin Uroš.

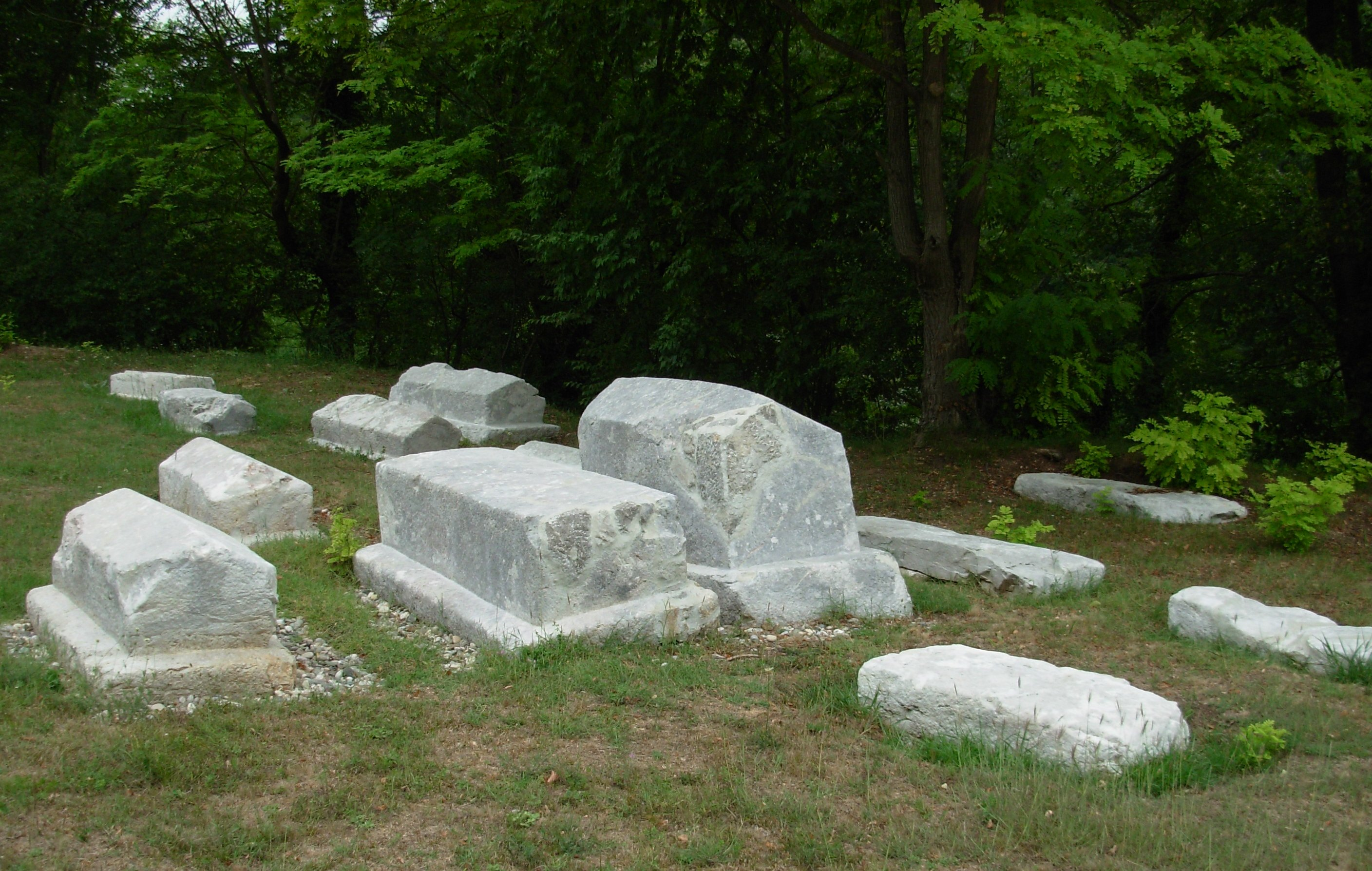
Medieval tombstones stećci found in Grand Principality of Serbia

In 1113 or 1114, the Byzantine army of Dyrrhachium invaded Duklja and captured its capital of Scutari. They subsequently installed their protégé, while ruler Đorđe took refuge in Serbia under the protection of Uroš and married his relative. The two led an army into Duklja in 1125, successfully retaining most of its territory. After a Byzantine invasion of the maritime, they nominally recognized Gradinja, resulting in a guerrilla war which ended with Đorđe's capture. Gradinja, however, only ruled a small portion of Duklja and subsequently strengthened ties with Serbia. In ca. 1127, a Byzantine–Hungarian war broke out, with the Hungarians taking over Belgrade, then penetrating to Niš, Sofia, and Philippopolis, after which John defeated them with infantry and navy on the Danube. The Serbs, who had in the meantime recognized Byzantine rule, expelled the Byzantine governor at Ras, Kritopl, who fled to Constantinople where he was ridiculed.

Uroš I had three sons, Uroš II, Desa and Beloš, and one daughter, Jelena, from a marriage with Anna Diogenissa, the granddaughter of Byzantine Emperor Romanos IV Diogenes. On 1 March 1131, he married his daughter to King Béla II of Hungary. Béla II, being blind, relied entirely on Jelena who acted as a co-ruler. Jelena is sourced as having decided to massacre 68 aristocrats at the Arad assembly, due to their persuasion of Coloman to blind her husband earlier. In 1137, Ladislaus II, the son of Béla II and Jelena, became the titular Ban of Bosnia. When Béla II died on 13 February 1141, the eldest son Géza II ascended the throne, still a child. Therefore, Jelena and her brother Beloš, whom she had invited to the court, ruled the Kingdom of Hungary as regents until September 1146 when he came of age. In 1145 Beloš received the title of comes palatinus (count palatine), the highest court title — meaning he could substitute for the King whenever necessary. Since 1142 Beloš served as the Ban of Croatia.

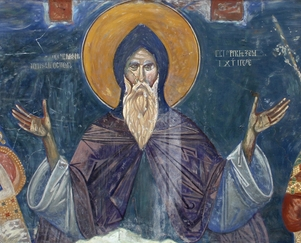
Grand Prince Stefan Nemanja

Uroš I was succeeded by his son, Uroš II. Beloš had close ties with Uroš II, and they were able to count on each other in times of trouble. In ca. 1148, the political situation in the Balkans was divided by two sides, one being the alliance of the Byzantines and Venice, the other the Normans and Hungarians. The Normans were sure of the danger that the battlefield would move from the Balkans to their area in Italy. Emperor Manuel I Komnenos also allied himself with the Germans after defeating the Cumans in 1148. The Serbs, Hungarians and Normans exchanged envoys, being in the interest of the Normans to stop Manuel's plans to recover Italy. In 1149, Beloš's Hungarian army aided Uroš II against the Byzantines. The Serbs under brothers Uroš II and Desa revolted against the Byzantines when Manuel was in Avlona planning an offensive across the Adriatic, and this revolt posed danger to the Emperor if he would attack Italy, as the Serbs could strike at the Adriatic bases.

Uroš II and Desa next undertook an offensive against Radoslav of Duklja, who was a loyal Byzantine vassal. Radoslav was pushed to the southwestern corner of Duklja, to Kotor, and retained only the coastal area, with the brothers holding much of inland Duklja and Trebinje – over two-thirds of Duklja. Radoslav sought help from the Emperor, who sent aid from Dyrrhachium. At this moment, the Chronicle of the Priest of Duklja ends, presumably because the author of the original text had died. A major war was about to erupt in the Balkans; Uroš II and Desa, in light of Byzantine retaliation, sought aid from their brother Beloš, the count palatine of Hungary. By 1150, Hungarian troops played an active role in Serbia.

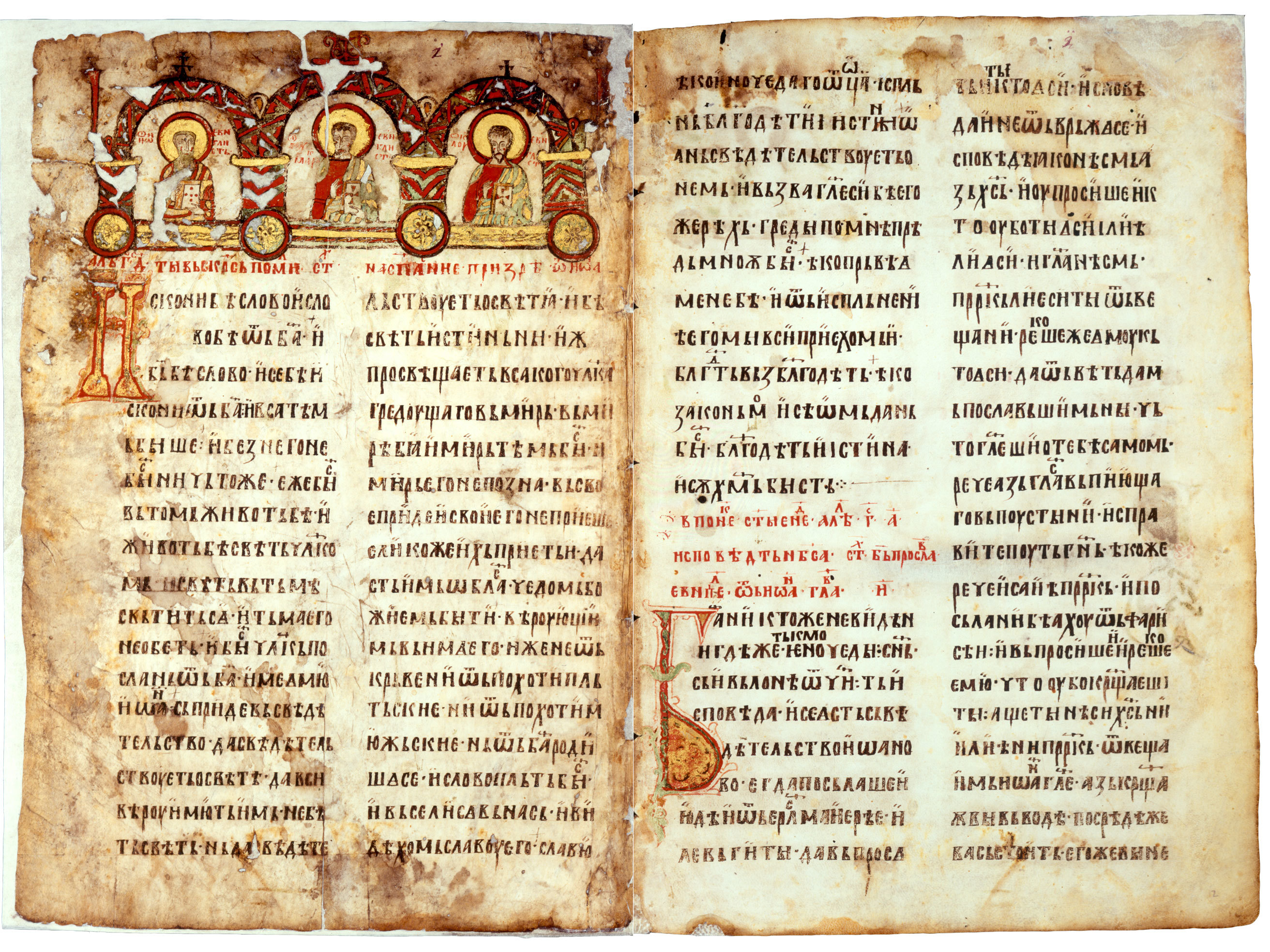
Miroslav Gospel, one of the oldest surviving documents written in Serbian recension of Church Slavonic, created by order of Prince Miroslav of Hum

In 1150, Desa was mentioned in a charter as dux of Duklja, Travunija and Zahumlje. In 1150, Uroš II swore loyalty to the Byzantine Emperor and demanded that Desa be put in prison. He recovered his title and lands, and Desa also swore loyalty, and was recognized as ruler of the Dalmatian lands. The two brothers were to rule the appointed regions as Manuel's vassals. The event was part of what would become a competition between the Byzantine Emperor and Holy Roman Emperor that would soon move into Hungary. In 1151, Manuel I declared war on Hungary. This was because Hungary had aided Serbia in its revolts against Byzantine rule. Byzantine troops were sent into Syrmia and across the Danube. The Byzantines caused great destruction and then withdrew, the operation being strictly punitive, with no occupation of lands. Géza II soon signed a peace treaty. Over the next 20 years, there were to be 10 campaigns against Hungary. Manuel I was able to keep the Hungarians under control in the Balkans, at the expense of abandoning the Norman conflict. In 1153, Desa ousted Uroš II; the pro-Hungarian faction at the Serbian court was upset with the Byzantine overlordship. In autumn 1154, Manuel I settled the dispute between Uroš II and Desa. The Emperor restored Uroš II in 1155 or 1156 and gave Desa the appanage of Dendra near Niš. In 1161–62, Uroš II was briefly replaced by Beloš, who then returned to his office in Hungary and Croatia. Uroš II seems to have died in 1165 or 1166.

Manuel I now put Tihomir at the Serbian throne; he was the son of Zavida, a close relative to Uroš II who had held Zahumlje. The rule was divided between Tihomir and his three younger brothers: Tihomir held supreme rule, while Stracimir ruled West Morava, Miroslav ruled Hum and Travunija, and Stefan Nemanja ruled Toplica, Ibar, Rasina and Reke. The youngest of the brothers, Nemanja, was also given the county of Dubočica by Manuel I; he had aided the Byzantines against the Hungarians in Syrmia (1164). Tihomir most likely saw Nemanja's ties with Manuel I as a threat. Nemanja had monasteries built in Kuršumlija and near Kosanica, without the approval of Tihomir; Nemanja thought he had the freedom to do so, while Tihomir disagreed, thinking that Nemanja sought independence as he had close relations with Manuel I.

Tihomir had Nemanja imprisoned, and his lands taken. Nemanja's supporters conspired to the church that Tihomir had done all this because of his disapproval of church building, thus the Serbian church turned against him; Nemanja managed to escape, and returned to his lands. Now, Nemanja mobilized an army, possibly with Byzantine help (Manuel I might have been displeased with Tihomir's acting), and headed for the crown. Tihomir, Stracimir and Miroslav were defeated, and expelled to Byzantium in 1167. As Nemanja had now become very powerful, and the Byzantines had wanted to see Serbia weak by dividing it, Manuel I now turned to the expelled brothers. Tihomir, provided with an army, was dispatched from Skopje and met Nemanja's large army near Zvečan. Nemanja decisively defeated him at Pantino, with Tihomir drowning in the Sitnica river, and then proceeded to capture his other brothers with whom he made peace and offered their former lands in return for recognizing him as the only ruler of Serbia. Although not recorded in the historical sources, somewhere in the second half of the 12th century, Stari Ras was conquered and came under full Serbian control, becoming the centre of defence and residency for a long period.

== Administrative divisions ==
- Serbian lands (Raška)
  - Ras
  - Drina
  - Patkovo
  - Hvosno
  - Podrimlje
  - Toplica
  - Ibar
  - Rasina
  - West Morava
  - Dubočica
  - Kostrc
  - Draškovina
  - Sitnica
  - Lab
  - Lipljan
  - Glbočica
  - Reke
  - Uska
  - Pomoravlje
  - Zagrlata
  - Levče
  - Belica
  - Lim
  - Kujavča
  - Zatrnava
- Zeta (historical Duklja)
  - Luška
  - Budva
  - Onogošt
  - Oblik
  - Ribnica
- Hum (historical Zachlumia)
  - Ston
  - Popovo
  - Dubrava
  - Luka
  - Dabar
  - Žapska
  - Gorička
  - Večenik
- Travunia
  - Trebinje
  - Urmo
  - Konavlje
  - Risan
  - Rudina
- Raban (Arbanon)
  - Pilot

== Economy ==
The important Via de Zenta, a trade route connecting the Adriatic with Serbia started from the mouth of the Bojana, the Shkodër (Skadar) port, (alternatively Bar then Cetinje) along the Drin Valley to Prizren, then to Lipljan, then through Novo Brdo to Vranje and Niš. The Republic of Venice and Ragusa used the road for trade with Serbia and Bulgaria.

John Kinnamos, writing about the Byzantine conquest of Galič near Kosovska Mitrovica in 1149, said that many barbarians were imprisoned "who were partly warriors and partly cattle breeders".

William, the archbishop of Tyre, when crossing Serbia for the Holy Land in 1168, he described the Serbs: "They are rich in herds and flocks and unusually well supplied with milk, cheese, butter, meat, honey and wax".

In the 12th and 13th centuries the Republic of Ragusa benefited greatly by becoming a commercial outpost of the rising and prosperous Serbian state, especially after the signing of a treaty with Stefan the First-Crowned. Later, in 1268, Uroš signed a treaty with Ragusa imposing the, so-called, St. Demetrious Revenue (Svetodimitarski dohodak), by which Ragusans were to pay to Serbian king 2,000 hyperperi a year.

== Culture ==
- Monastery of Saint Nicholas in Kuršumlija (1166)
- Đurđevi stupovi in Ras (1171)
- Studenica Monastery on the Ibar (1190)
- Monastery of the Holy Theotokos, between Kosanica and Toplica
- Church of the Holy Theotokos, at the confluence of Bistrica and Lim
- Monastery of Saint Nicholas in Končulj on the Ibar

== See also ==
- Serbia in the Middle Ages

== Notes ==
1. The Latin name Rascia or Rassa (sr. Raška) was used as an exonym for Serbia in Western sources since the 13th century. Raška was a river flowing through the region, Ras was a royal estate, and seat of an eparchy. All contemporary Byzantine works used "Serbia" for the state. Papal charters from the 11th and 12th centuries show that "Rascia" was not used for the state. Only in the time of Stefan Nemanja, the term came to begin being used as a synonym for Serbia in Western sources, although still alongside "Serbia": The Gesta Hungarorum (1172–96) used "terra Racy" (Rascian land), bishop Diepold of Passau called the state "Serbia" (1189), while Ansbert called Nemanja the "Grand Prince of Serbia and Rascia". The term "Rascia" was principally used in the 14th century for the Kingdom of Serbia. The common misunderstanding comes from the 14th century Chronicle of the Priest of Duklja which anachronistically refers to pre mid-12th century Principality of Serbia as Raška.
2. Reign: Fine in The Early Medieval Balkans puts his reign "by 1145 to early 1160s", with Desa briefly ruling in 1150 and 1155. Fine in The Late Medieval Balkans puts his reign until 1161/1162, with Desa briefly ruling in 1155.

== Sources ==
- Ферјанчић, Божидар (1959). "Константин VII Порфирогенит". Византиски извори за историју народа Југославије. Vol. 2. Београд: Византолошки институт. pp. 1–98.
- Flusin, Bernard; Cheynet, Jean-Claude, eds. (2003). John Scylitzès: Empereurs de Constantinople. Paris: Lethielleux. ISBN 9782283604595.
- Кунчер, Драгана (2009). Gesta Regum Sclavorum. Vol. 1. Београд-Никшић: Историјски институт, Манастир Острог.
- Moravcsik, Gyula, ed. (1967) [1949]. Constantine Porphyrogenitus: De Administrando Imperio (2nd revised ed.). Washington D.C.: Dumbarton Oaks Center for Byzantine Studies. ISBN 9780884020219.
- Острогорски, Георгије; Баришић, Фрањо, eds. (1966). Византијски извори за историју народа Југославије. Vol. 3. Београд: Византолошки институт.
- Острогорски, Георгије; Баришић, Фрањо, eds. (1971). Византијски извори за историју народа Југославије. Vol. 4. Београд: Византолошки институт.
- Thallóczy, Lajos; Áldásy, Antal, eds. (1907). Magyarország és Szerbia közti összeköttetések oklevéltára 1198-1526. Budapest: Magyar Tudományos Akadémia.
- Thurn, Hans, ed. (1973). Ioannis Scylitzae Synopsis historiarum. Berlin-New York: De Gruyter. ISBN 9783110022858.
- Шишић, Фердо, ed. (1928). Летопис Попа Дукљанина. Београд-Загреб: Српска краљевска академија.
- Wortley, John, ed. (2010). John Skylitzes: A Synopsis of Byzantine History, 811–1057. New York: Cambridge University Press. ISBN 9781139489157.
- Живковић, Тибор (2009). Gesta Regum Sclavorum. Vol. 2. Београд-Никшић: Историјски институт, Манастир Острог.

=== Secondary sources ===
- Bataković, Dušan T., ed. (2005). Histoire du peuple serbe [History of the Serbian People] (in French). Lausanne: L’Age d’Homme. ISBN 9782825119587.
- Blagojević, Miloš (2001). Državna uprava u srpskim srednjovekovnim zemljama (in Serbian). Službeni list SRJ. ISBN 9788635504971.
- Ćirković, Sima (2004). The Serbs. Malden: Blackwell Publishing. ISBN 9781405142915.
- Curta, Florin (2006). Southeastern Europe in the Middle Ages, 500–1250. Cambridge: Cambridge University Press. ISBN 9780521815390.
- Curta, Florin (2019). Eastern Europe in the Middle Ages (500-1300). Leiden and Boston: Brill. ISBN 9789004395190.
- Dinić, M. (1966). "O nazivima srednjovekovne srpske države". Prilozi za književnost, jezik, istoriju i folklor. 32 (1–2). Belgrade.
- Fine, John V. A. Jr. (1991) [1983]. The Early Medieval Balkans: A Critical Survey from the Sixth to the Late Twelfth Century. Ann Arbor: University of Michigan Press. ISBN 0-472-08149-7.
- Fine, John V. A. (1994) [1987]. The Late Medieval Balkans: A Critical Survey from the Late Twelfth Century to the Ottoman Conquest. Ann Arbor, Michigan: University of Michigan Press. ISBN 978-0-472-10079-8.
- Dimnik, Martin (2004). "Kievan Rus', the Bulgars and the southern Slavs, c. 1020—c. 1200". The New Cambridge Medieval History. 4: 254–276. doi:10.1017/CHOL9780521414111.011. ISBN 9781139054034.
- Dvornik, Francis (1962). The Slavs in European History and Civilization. New Brunswick: Rutgers University Press.
- Janković, Đorđe (2004). "The Slavs in the 6th Century North Illyricum". Гласник Српског археолошког друштва. 20: 39–61.
- Kalić, Jovanka (1995). "Rascia - The Nucleus of the Medieval Serbian State". The Serbian Question in the Balkans. Belgrade: Faculty of Geography. pp. 147–155.
- Kalić, Jovanka (2017). "The First Coronation Churches of Medieval Serbia". Balcanica (48): 7–18. doi:10.2298/BALC1748007K. hdl:21.15107/rcub_dais_4886.
- Komatina, Ivana (2016). Crkva i država u srpskim zemljama od XI do XIII veka [Church and State in the Serbian Lands from the XIth to the XIIIth Century]. Istorijski institut. ISBN 978-86-7743-113-6.
- Novaković, Relja (2010) [1981]. "Gde se nalazila Srbija od VII do XII veka: Zaključak i rezime monografije" (Internet ed.). Belgrade: Narodna knjiga i Istorijski institut.
- Ostrogorsky, George (1956). History of the Byzantine State. Oxford: Basil Blackwell.
- Popović, Marko (1999). Tvrđava Ras [The Fortress of Ras] (in Serbian). Belgrade: Archaeological Institute. ISBN 9788680093147.
- Srejović, Dragoslav; Gavrilović, Slavko; Ćirković, Sima M. (1982). Istorija srpskog naroda: knj. Od najstarijih vremena do Maričke bitke (1371) (in Serbian). Srpska književna zadruga.
- Stanojević, Stanoje (1989) [1927]. Сви српски владари: биографије српских (са црногорским и босанским) и преглед хрватских владара. Opovo: Simbol. ISBN 86-81299-04-2.
- Stephenson, Paul (2000). Byzantium's Balkan Frontier: A Political Study of the Northern Balkans, 900-1204. Cambridge: Cambridge University Press. ISBN 9780521770170.
- Veselinović, Andrija; Ljušić, Radoš (2008). Srpske dinastije (in Serbian). Službeni glasnik. ISBN 978-86-7549-921-3.
- Živković, Tibor (2006). Портрети српских владара (IX-XII век) (in Serbian). Belgrade: Zavod za udžbenike. ISBN 86-17-13754-1.
- Živković, Tibor (2008). Forging unity: The South Slavs between East and West 550–1150. Belgrade: The Institute of History, Čigoja štampa. ISBN 9788675585732.
