= Grand Župan =

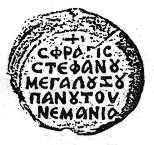
Seal of Serbian Grand Prince Stefan Nemanja (r. 1166–1196), with Greek inscription containing the title megalou zoupanou (veliki župan)

Grand Župan, also Great or Chief Župan (Serbian: Велики жупан, Veliki župan, Latin: magnus iupanus, Greek: ζουπανος μεγας, romanized: zoupanos megas) is a common English rendering of a medieval South Slavic title that designates a hierarchically senior župan, who is first among, or superior to other župans (chiefs of a regional units called župa). It was most commonly attested in Medieval Serbia, where it was used as a princely title by rulers of the Grand Principality of Serbia, from the end of the 11th century, up to 1219, when it was replaced by royal title, upon the established of the Kingdom of Serbia.

== Bulgaria ==
A decorated silver cup with a Medieval Greek inscription attests to the use of the title zoupanos megas in 9th-century Bulgaria. The inscription refers to a certain Sivin (Bulgar name), who appears to have held that position at the time of Kniaz Boris I (852–889). Sivin was among the Bulgarian boyars who supported the official Christianization, as the subsequently added line "May God help" suggests. The title zoupan tarkanos was also interpreted as having same or similar meaning.

== Serbia ==
In the Middle Ages, the Serbian veliki župan (велики жупан) was the supreme chieftain in the multi-tribal society. The title signifies overlordship as the leader of lesser chieftains titled župan. It was used by the Serb rulers in the 11th and 12th centuries. In Greek, it was known as archizoupanos (ἄρχιζουπάνος), megazoupanos (μεγαζουπάνος) and megalos zoupanos (μεγάλος ζουπάνος).

In the 1090s, Vukan became the veliki župan in Grand Principality of Serbia. Stefan Nemanja expelled his brother Tihomir in 1168 and assumed the title of veliki župan, as described in the Charter of Hilandar (и постави ме великог жупана). A Latin document used mega iupanus for King Stefan the First-Crowned (Stephanus dominus Seruie siue Rasie, qui mega iupanus). Afterward, it was a high noble rank with notable holders such as Altoman Vojinović (fl. 1335–59).

== Yugoslavia ==
It was used in the Kingdom of Serbs, Croats and Slovenes (1922–29) as a governmental title for the head of the oblast (an administrative division), the state was divided into 33 oblasts.

== Sources ==
- Bataković, Dušan T., ed. (2005). Histoire du peuple serbe [History of the Serbian People] (in French). Lausanne: L’Age d’Homme.
- Ćirković, Sima (2004). The Serbs. Malden: Blackwell Publishing.
- Curta, Florin (2006). Southeastern Europe in the Middle Ages, 500–1250. Cambridge: Cambridge University Press.
- Fine, John Van Antwerp Jr. (1991) [1983]. The Early Medieval Balkans: A Critical Survey from the Sixth to the Late Twelfth Century. Ann Arbor: University of Michigan Press.
- Fine, John Van Antwerp Jr. (1994) [1987]. The Late Medieval Balkans: A Critical Survey from the Late Twelfth Century to the Ottoman Conquest. Ann Arbor: University of Michigan Press.
