= Stracimir Zavidović =

- Died: After December 25, 1189
- Title: Župan of West Morava
- Parent: Zavida

Stracimir Zavidović (Serbian Cyrillic: Страцимир Завидовић) was a 12th-century Serbian prince (Župan) of West Morava, an administrative division (appanage) of the Grand Principality of Serbia, from 1163–1166.

He was a son of Zavida, a prince of the house of Vukanović that briefly held the appanage of Zahumlje.

Stracimir was given the oblasts of West Morava to rule as a Župan (prince, the second highest title) following Byzantium's division of the Serb lands by Manuel I. His brothers were given česti (parts): Miroslav ruled Zahumlje and Travunia, Stefan Nemanja was given Toplica, Ibar, Rasina, and Reke, while the first-born, Tihomir, was given supreme rule of the principality.

He built the fortress of Morava Gradac (Moravski Gradac, Моравски Градац), Monastery of Our Lady, in Čačak, where he was seated.

In 1166 Stefan Nemanja overthrew Tihomir in a coup and had him and his brothers, Stracimir and Miroslav, expelled to Byzantium in 1167/1168. Stefan Nemanja defeated Tihomir and his Byzantine army. Tihomir drowned in a river and the other brothers were stripped of their titles, with Nemanja becoming ruler of All Serbia. He pardoned his brothers and Stracimir continued to rule his lands. When Stefan Nemanja besieged and retook control of Duklja in the 1180s, Stracimir and Miroslav attacked the forces of Doclean ruler and kinsman Mihailo.

Royal titles
First New title	Župan of West Morava under Tihomir; 1163–1166	Succeeded by ?
