= Petrislav of Rascia =

Petrislav of Rascia Petrislav Vojislavljević
- Prince of Serbia (Župan)

Prince of Serbia
- Reign: ca. 1060–1083
- Successor: Vukan
- Issue: Vukan; Marko
- House: Vojislavljević
- Father: Mihailo I
- Religion: Eastern Christianity

Petrislav (Serbian Cyrillic: Петрислав; fl. 1060–1083) was the Prince of Raška (Latin: Rascia; later anachronism for the Grand Principality of Serbia), a province under influence of the Grand Principality of Doclea, from 1060 to 1083. He was appointed to govern Serbia by his father, Grand Prince Mihailo I, who had reunited Serbia (the Zagora region of the former early medieval Serbian Principality) into the Serbian realm after decades of Byzantine annexation.

== Background ==
Bosnia, Zahumlje, and Rascia (i.e. Serbia) never were incorporated into an integrated state with Doclea. Each principality had its own nobility and institutions, simply requiring a member of the royal family to rule as Prince or Duke.

== Life ==
Petrislav was the last son of Mihailo I and his Greek second wife.

Mihailo I reconquered Serbia from the Byzantines between 1060 and 1074. He appointed Petrislav as Prince of Serbia. Mihailo I died in 1081, and Constantine Bodin succeeded as Prince. By 1085, the Vojislavljević brothers suppressed the revolt in the župa of Zeta, staged by their cousins, the sons of Radoslav. Constantine Bodin ruled unchallengedly.

He was succeeded by his two sons, Vukan and Marko, in 1083.

Petrislav of Rascia Vojislavljević
Royal titles
Preceded by Ljutovid as strategos of Serbia	Prince of Serbia; 1060–1083	Succeeded by Vukan
Vacant Title last held by Catepan of Ras	Prince of Serbia; 1060–1083	Succeeded by Vukan
