= Stephen, Duke of Bosnia =

Stephen
- knez ("duke") of Bosnia

Duke of Bosnia
- Reign: fl. 1084–1095
- Issue: A daughter who married Kočapar
- House: Vojislavljević dynasty
- Religion: Christianity
- Occupation: Nobleman, ruler

Bosnia and other Serbian polities in the late 11th century.

Stephen (Serbo-Croatian: Stefan / Стефан, Stjepan / Стјепан; fl. 1084–95) was the knez ("duke") of Bosnia mentioned in the late 13th century Chronicle of the Priest of Dioclea ("Bosnam posuitque ibi Stephanum knezium", according to Johannes Lucius), appointed in c. 1083–84 by his first cousin Constantine Bodin, the king of Dioclea. Bodin had also appointed his relative Vukan at Rascia. Bosnia, Zachlumia and Rascia were never incorporated into an integrated state with Dioclea; each principality had its own nobility and institutions, simply requiring a member of the Dioclean royal family to rule as prince or duke. According to Jacob Luccari's Annals of Ragusa (1605), Stephen participated in the siege of Ragusa in 1094–95, as Bodin's vassal.

After Constantine died, the principalities seceded from Dioclea, and Vukan became the most powerful Serb ruler, as grand prince. According to CPD, after the death of Bodin (c. 1099), one of the pretendants to the throne, Kočapar, tried to take the rule in Dioclea, relying on Vukan. As Kočapar felt danger from that side as well, he took refuge in Bosnia, where he married the daughter of the "Bosnian ban" in ca. 1100–01, though he died soon afterwards while fighting in Zachlumia. This Bosnian ban was most likely Stephen. Luccari and Orbini mention Stephen's son and successor Vukmir (Vutïmir). The territory governed by Stephen cannot be precisely known, apart from the fact that the name of Bosnia was identified with the region of the upper and middle basin of the Bosna river, with the area of the Sarajevo and Visoko fields.

== Sources ==
- Fine, John Van Antwerp Jr. (1991). The Early Medieval Balkans: A Critical Survey from the Sixth to the Late Twelfth Century. Michigan: The University of Michigan Press. ISBN 0-472-08149-7.
- Fine, John Van Antwerp Jr. (1994). The Late Medieval Balkans: A Critical Survey from the Late Twelfth Century to the Ottoman Conquest. University of Michigan Press. p. 630. ISBN 0-472-08260-4.
- Klaić, Vjekoslav (1882). Poviest Bosne do propasti kraljevstva. Tiskom Dioničke tiskare. "Presbyteri Diocleatis regnum Slavorum apud Lucium p. 293. • Deinde caepit Bosnam posuitque ibi Stephanum knezium."
- Mrgić, Jelena; Živković, Tibor (2008). Северна Босна: 13-16. век. Историјски институт. p. 52. ISBN 9788677430719.
- Živković, Tibor (2006). Portreti srpskih vladara (IX—XII vek). Belgrade. ISBN 86-17-13754-1.

Stephen rules as a Knez
Regnal titles
New title First known	Duke of Bosnia fl. 1084–1095	Vacant Title next held by Ladislaus II
