= Church of Saints Peter and Paul, Bijelo Polje =

Church of Saints Peter and Paul
- Црква светих апостола Петра и Павла
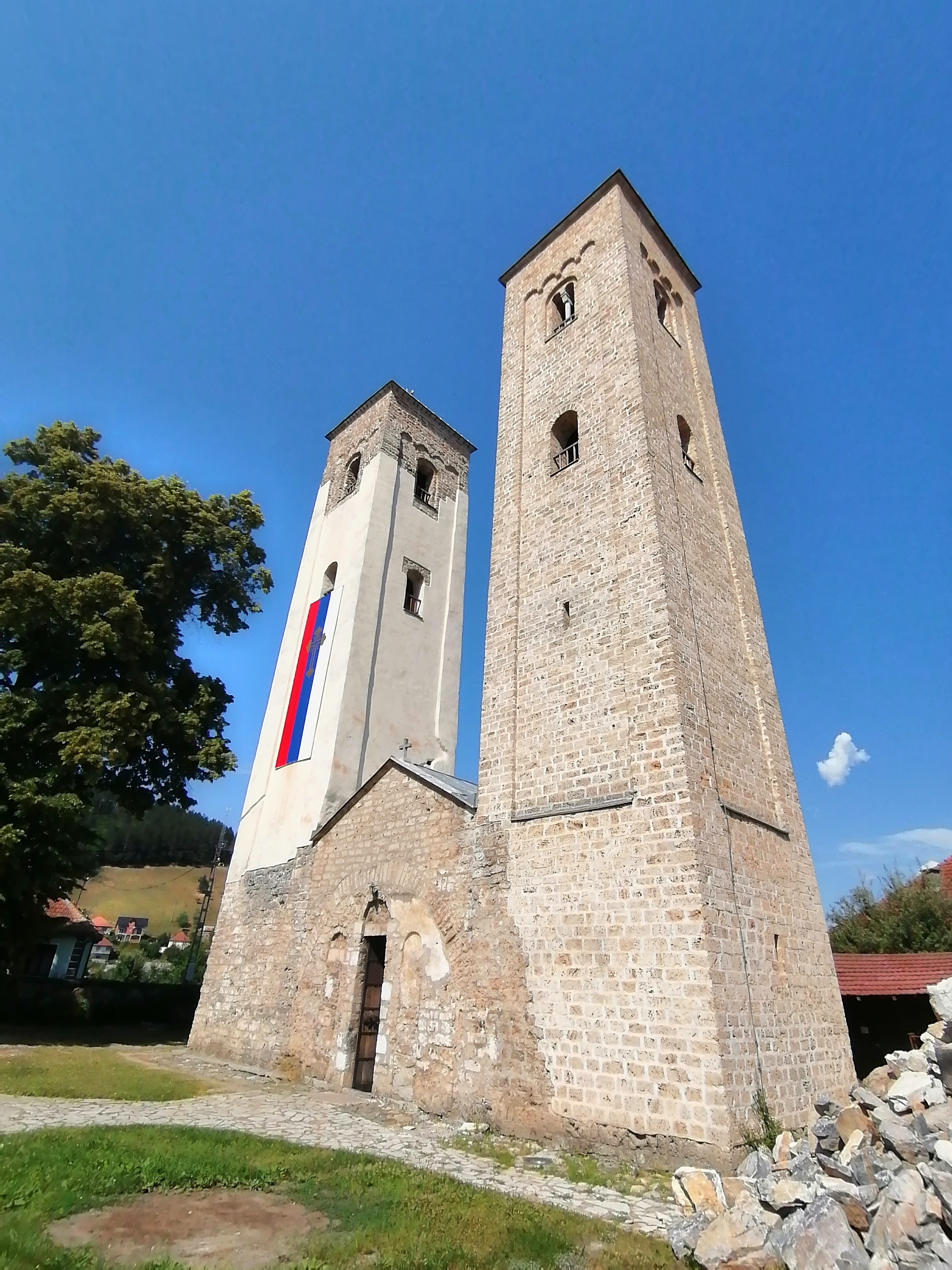
- Church of Saints Peter and Paul
- Church of Saints Peter and Paul
- 43°02′08″N 19°44′41″E
- Location: Bijelo Polje
- Country: Montenegro
- Denomination: Serbian Orthodox

History
- Dedication: Saint Peter & Saint Paul

Administration
- Archdiocese: Eparchy of Budimlja and Nikšić

The Church of Saints Peter and Paul (Serbian: Црква светих апостола Петра и Павла, Crkva svetih apostola Petra i Pavla) in Bijelo Polje is a medieval Serbian Orthodox church in Montenegro. The building is renowned for its unusual architectural composition, combining a relatively small main body with a towering six-story belfry.

Constructed in multiple phases from the 6th to the 14th century, the church reflects a blend of pre-Romanesque and Byzantine architectural influences and demonstrates historical connections between Medieval Serbia’s hinterlands and the Adriatic coast. It is notable as the place where Miroslav Gospel, a key work of Serbian literature included in UNESCO’s Memory of the World register of Serbia, was written.

== History ==
Archaeological evidence suggests the site originally hosted a single-aisled church from the 6th century, later rebuilt in the late 11th or early 12th century. According to an inscription above its entrance, the church was built in 1196 by Prince Miroslav of Hum, brother of Stefan Nemanja. The building's role in the medieval church hierarchy is evidenced by the relocation of the bishopric seat from Ston to Bijelo Polje in 1254. It served for many years as the seat of the Hum bishopric, with the first bishop being Sava, the second son of King Stefan the First-Crowned. During Ottoman Empire rule, the church was converted into a mosque in 1691, remaining so until the liberation of Bijelo Polje in 1912.

== See also ==
- Eparchy of Budimlja and Nikšić
- Raška architectural school
