= Jovanka Kalić =

Serbian historian

Jovanka Kalić Јованка Калић
- Born: 1933 (age 92–93); Belgrade, Kingdom of Yugoslavia
- Occupation: historian

Jovanka Kalić (Serbian Cyrillic: Јованка Калић) (born in Belgrade on 15 September 1933) is a Serbian historian, university professor and member of the Serbian Academy of Sciences and Arts.

== Biography ==
She graduated from the University of Belgrade Faculty of Philosophy history department in 1956. Kalić started her research work during her studies. Between 1958 and 1961 she worked as an assistant at the Institute of History in Belgrade. In 1961, she started to work as a lecturer at the University of Belgrade Faculty of Philosophy and in 1964, she earned her PhD on the topic of the medieval history of Belgrade. In 1970, she became assistant professor and in 1976, full-time professor at the University of Belgrade. After the death of Ivan Božić, she was elected as the chair of the Department of General History. The International Committee of Historical Sciences granted her a project on Byzantine history, in the section on Byzantine history in Yugoslavia.

Kalić participated in numerous scientific conferences and held guest lectures at numerous universities including Stanford University, University of California, Santa Barbara, and Los Angeles, University of Warsaw, Salento, Augsburg, Münster, Graz and Vienna.

While married, she used an additional surname, and was known as Jovanka Kalić-Mijušković (Јованка Калић-Мијушковић).

== Awards and honours ==
- In 1994, she became a member of the Serbian Academy of Sciences and Arts.
- In 1964 and 1971, she received the City of Belgrade October Award.

== Selected works ==
- Калић, Јованка (1967). Београд у средњем веку. Београд: Српска књижевна задруга.
- Калић, Јованка (1970). "Рашки велики жупан Урош II". Зборник радова Византолошког института. 12: 21–39.
- Калић, Јованка (1971). "Подаци Абу Хамида о приликама у Јужној Угарској средином XII века". Зборник за историју. 4. Матица српска: 25–37.
- Калић, Јованка (1976). "Из историје Пријепоља и Трговишта у XV веку". Симпозијум Сеоски дани Сретена Вукосављевића. 4: 141–151.
- Kalić, Jovanka (1977). "Ras u srednjem veku: Pravci istraživanja". Новопазарски зборник. 1: 55–61. Archived from the original on 2021-07-06.
- Калић, Јованка (1979). "Назив Рашка у старијој српској историји (IX-XII век)". Зборник Филозофског факултета. 14 (1): 79–92.
- Калић, Јованка (1981). "Српски велики жупани у борби с Византијом". Историја српског народа. Vol. књ. 1. Београд: Српска књижевна задруга. pp. 197–211.
- Калић, Јованка (1982). "Велики преокрет". Историја српског народа. Vol. књ. 2. Београд: Српска књижевна задруга. pp. 64–74.
- Калић, Јованка (1982). "Немирно доба". Историја српског народа. Vol. књ. 2. Београд: Српска књижевна задруга. pp. 75–87.
- Калић, Јованка (1982). "Снажење Деспотовине". Историја српског народа. Vol. књ. 2. Београд: Српска књижевна задруга. pp. 88–99.
- Калић, Јованка (1982). "Доба привидног мира". Историја српског народа. Vol. књ. 2. Београд: Српска књижевна задруга. pp. 205–217.
- Спремић, Момчило; Калић, Јованка (1982). "Султан Мехмед II Освајач и Србија". Историја српског народа. Vol. књ. 2. Београд: Српска књижевна задруга. pp. 289–302.
- Калић, Јованка (1984). "Ниш у средњем веку". Историјски часопис. 31: 5–40.
- Калић, Јованка (1986). "Кнегиња Марија". Зограф: Часопис за средњовековну уметност. 17: 21–35.
- Калић, Јованка (1988). "Столно место Србије". Новопазарски зборник. 12: 13–22. Archived from the original on 2021-01-28.
- Калић, Јованка (1989). "Прокопијева Арса". Зборник радова Византолошког института. 27–28: 9–17.
- Калић, Јованка (1994). Срби у позном средњем веку (1. ed.). Београд: Балканолошки институт. ISBN 9788671790192.
  - Калић, Јованка (2001). Срби у позном средњем веку (2. ed.). Београд: Историјски институт. ISBN 9788635504902.
  - Калић, Јованка (2012). Срби у позном средњем веку (3. ed.). Београд: Завод за уџбенике. ISBN 9788617170507.
- Калић, Јованка (1994). "Српска црква у средњовековном Расу". Новопазарски зборник. 18: 7–11. Archived from the original on 2021-01-28.
- Калић, Јованка (1995). "Предтурска историја Новог Пазара". Новопазарски зборник. 19: 301–304. Archived from the original on 2020-06-10.
- Kalić, Jovanka (1995). "Rascia - The Nucleus of the Medieval Serbian State". The Serbian Question in the Balkans. Belgrade: Faculty of Geography. pp. 147–155.
- Калић, Јованка (1997). "Жупан Белош". Зборник радова Византолошког института. 36: 63–81. ISBN 9788683883134.
- Калић, Јованка (1998). "Претече Жиче: крунидбена места српских владара". Историјски часопис. 44 (1997): 77–87.
- Калић, Јованка (1998). "Европа и Срби у XII веку". Глас САНУ. 384 (10): 95–108.
- Калић, Јованка (2000). "Два царства у српској историји XII века". Зборник радова Византолошког института. 38 (1999-2000): 197–214.
- Калић, Јованка (2002). "Рашка истраживања". Историјски часопис. 47 (2000): 11–24.
- Калић, Јованка (2003). "Београд у XII веку: Тврђава-град-полис". Зборник радова Византолошког института. 40: 91–96.
- Калић, Јованка (2004). "Рашка краљевина: Regnum Rasciae". Зборник радова Византолошког института. 41: 183–189.
- Калић, Јованка (2006). Европа и Срби: Средњи век. Београд: Службени лист СРЈ. ISBN 9788677430580.
- Kalić, Jovanka (2006). "La Serbie et l'Italie au XII siécle". Глас САНУ. 404 (13): 85–94.
- Калић, Јованка (2007). "Српска држава и Охридска архиепископија у XII веку". Зборник радова Византолошког института. 44: 197–208.
- Калић, Јованка (2009). "Држава и црква у Србији XIII века". Зборник радова Византолошког института. 46: 129–137.
- Калић, Јованка (2010). "Стара Рашка". Глас САНУ. 414 (15): 105–114.
- Калић, Јованка (2011). "Манастир Светог Ђорђа у Расу". На траговима Војислава Ј. Ђурића. Београд: САНУ. pp. 101–108.
- Калић, Јованка (2013). "Епископски градови Србије у средњем веку" (PDF). Зборник радова Византолошког института. 50 (1): 433–447.
- Kalić, Jovanka (2014). "A Millennium of Belgrade (Sixth-Sixteenth Centuries): A Short Overview" (PDF). Balcanica (45): 71–96. doi:10.2298/BALC1445071K.
- Kalić, Jovanka (2017). "The First Coronation Churches of Medieval Serbia" (PDF). Balcanica (48): 7–18. doi:10.2298/BALC1748007K.
- Kalić, Jovanka (2019). "Information about Belgrade in Constantine VII Porphyrogenitus" (PDF). Balcanica (50): 33–38. doi:10.2298/BALC1950033K.
