= Vukan, Grand Prince of Serbia =

Grand Prince of Serbia from 1091 to 1112

Vukan
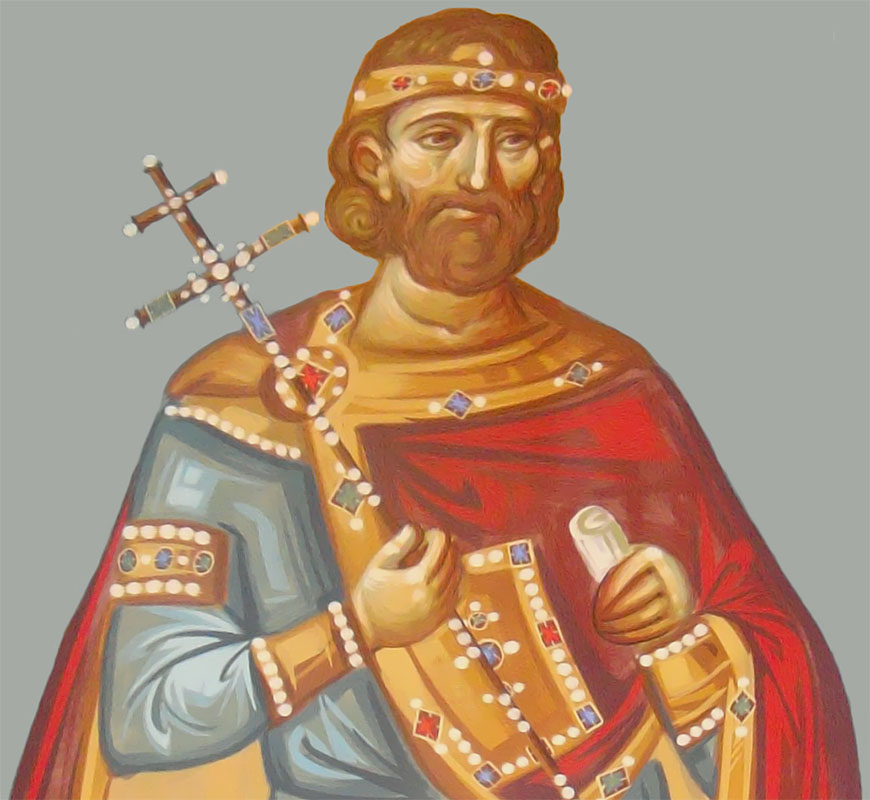

Grand Prince of Serbia
- Reign: 1091–1112
- Predecessor: Constantine Bodin
- Successor: Uroš I

Prince of Serbia
- Reign: 1083–1091
- Predecessor: Petrislav
- Successor: Uroš I
- Born: c. 1050
- Died: 1112 (aged 62)
- Dynasty: Vukanović
- Father: Petrislav
- Religion: Eastern Orthodox

Vukan I (Serbian: Вукан, Greek: Βολκάνος; c. 1050 – 1112) was the Grand Prince of Serbia from 1083 until he died in 1112. During their first years he ruled together with his brother Marko. With the death of his uncle, King Constantine Bodin of Duklja in 1101, he became the most powerful ruler among Serbian princes. He defeated the Byzantines several times, conquering parts of northern Macedonia. He is the eponymous founder of the Vukanović dynasty.

== Biography ==
Serbian polities in the late 11th century.

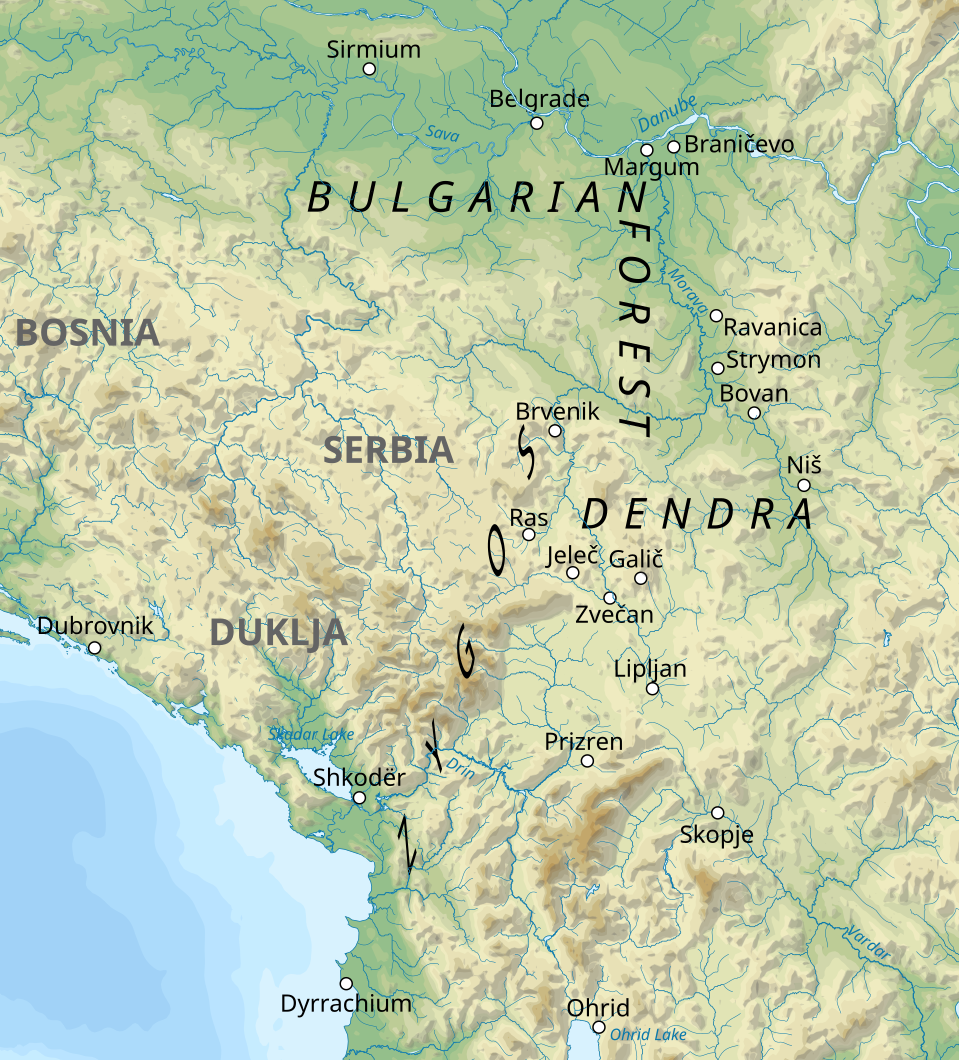
Byzantium's frontier in the 10-12th century (per Stephenson 2004, 2008).

Vukan was the first-born of Petrislav, the son of King Mihailo I and his second Greek wife. He and his brother Marko swore an oath of loyalty to Constantine Bodin and took power as his vassals in Serbia in 1083 or 1084. Marko later disappears from sources. Neither Bosnia, Zachlumia, nor Raška (i.e. Serbia) were ever permanently integrated into the Kingdom of Duklja. Each region had its nobility and institutions and acquired a Vojislavljević to head as Župan.

In 1089, Bodin managed to raise the bishopric of Bar to an Archbishopric, by supporting the pope against an antipope. The suffragan bishops were to be: Kotor, Ulcinj, Svac, Skadar, Drivast, Pula, Ras, Bosnia, and Trebinje. In obtaining its promotion, it acquired a much larger diocese, including territory that earlier had not been under the pope – territories of the metropolitan of Durazzo and Archbishop of Ochrid, two sees that recognized the jurisdiction of the Ecumenical Patriarchate of Constantinople. The Bar Archbishopric's new territory was merely theoretical – the pope's edict could only affect the churches that recognized Rome. Making Serbia a suffragan to Bar had little meaning, as most of its churches were under Constantinople, and there is no evidence of Vukan changing adherence to Rome. Durazzo and Ochrid may have suffered minimal territorial losses along the coast, Duklja was briefly a subject to Rome, however inland Duklja was not affected, and along with much of Duklja's coast (like most of Kotor) was to retain its loyalty to Orthodoxy.

A Byzantine campaign was launched against Duklja between 1089 and 1091, possibly managing to take Bodin captive for a second time. Civil war broke out in the realm among Bodin's relatives, greatly weakening Duklja, and giving the chance for inner Serbia to assert itself and break away. Vukan asserts independence, as well as Bosnia and Zahumlje. Up to this point, Duklja had been the center of the Serbian realm, as well as the main resistance to Byzantium in the Balkans. Inner Serbia became the most powerful of Serbian states, remaining so throughout the Middle Ages. Inner Serbia gradually replaced Duklja as the main opponent of Byzantine rule in the 12th century. Bodin's heirs were forced to recognize Byzantine overlordship, and had now only the small territory of Duklja and Travunia.

In 1091 or 1092, Vukan became independent, taking the title of Grand Prince (Veliki Župan). Subordinate to him were local dukes (Župan, holding a territory equivalent of a county), who seem to have been more or less autonomous in the internal affairs of their counties, but who were obliged to be loyal to Vukan, and supporting him in battle. It seems that the dukes were hereditary holders of their counties, holding their land before Duklja annexed inner Serbia.

In about 1090, Vukan began raiding Byzantine territory, first in the vicinity of Kosovo. Initially the Byzantines were unable to take steps against Vukan, as they faced a serious threat in the invading Pechenegs. On 29 April 1091, the Byzantines destroyed the Pecheneg force. With the defeat of the Pechenegs, Alexios I Komnenos could now turn to the Serbs.

Alexios I first sent an army with the strategos of Durazzo, which was defeated by Vukan in 1092. The Emperor now mobilized a much larger army, led by himself, marching onto inner Serbia. Vukan sends envoys, seeking peace which Alexios I quickly accepted, as a new problem had arisen at home in the Cumans who plundered the lands as far as Adrianople. Immediately after the Emperor's departure, Vukan breaks the treaty, and began to expand along the Vardar, obtaining much booty and taking the cities of Vranje, Skopje and Tetovo. In 1094 or 1095, Alexios I marched out to meet the Serbs. Vukan and his dukes arrive at the Emperor's tent and offer peace, with his own son Uroš I as hostage (throughout the 12th century it was usual for relatives of the Grand Prince to stay at the imperial court as hostages of peace).

At this time, Serbian principality was independent – Vukan acted entirely on his own, no longer a vassal of Duklja. Duklja, because of its civil war, did not involve itself in the Serbian-Byzantine wars.

Vukan again marched south, into Macedonia. Alexios could not do anything about him as the Crusade took place. In 1106 Vukan submitted to Alexios.

Following Bodin's death in 1101, Bodin's half-brother Dobroslav II succeeded him as king of Duklja. Kočopar Branislavljević, Bodin's first cousin once removed, travelled from Dyrrhachium to Serbia, forging an alliance with Vukan. This alliance would prove worthy in their successful invasion of Duklja in 1102. The battle that ensued at the Morača led to the overthrow of Dobroslav II and the coronation of Kočopar to the throne. Dobroslav was subsequently banished to Serbia. However, Kočopar's reign was short-lived as well as Vukan had been planning to install Bodin's nephew, Vladimir to the throne of Duklja. Kočopar, having lost influence among the Zachlumoi, married the daughter of a Zachlumian (Bosnian) prince (knez). However, in the Chronicle of the Priest of Duklja, the chronicler specifically mentioned that at the time, Zachlumia was ruled by a ban, not a knez. Kočopar later died in battle against the Zachlumoi. Upon his death, Vukan installed Bodin's nephew Vladimir as planned, to whom he gave his daughter as a wife and so strengthened ties between Serbia and Duklja. A mere pawn in dynastic conflicts, Vladimir was poisoned in 1118 under orders from Queen Jaquinta, widow of his late uncle, Constantine Bodin. Jaquinta then appointed her son, George, to the throne of Duklja.

Upon spreading his influence in Duklja, Vukan invaded Byzantium once more in the spring of 1106. He was probably attempting to take advantage of the Norman campaign against the Byzantines (see Byzantine–Norman wars). In a battle, he defeated John Komnenos again. The war was concluded by November of that year, with Vukan being forced to send hostages once again to emperor Alexios I in return for peace. There is no written record of Vukan after this war.

Scholars believe Vukan died after 1112. Vukan's successor was Uroš I his nephew through Marko.

== Notes ==
1. Death date: He died in 1112. Fine puts the time of death in c. 1122.
2. Raška was an anachronistic exonym since the 13-14th century, especially in the 14th century Chronicle of the Priest of Duklja, for the Principality of Serbia and Grand Principality of Serbia. Anna Komnene in detailed Alexiad does not mention Ras in the context of Vukan, only as a ruler of Serbia.

== Sources ==
Primary sources

- Шишић, Фердо, ed. (1928). Летопис Попа Дукљанина (Chronicle of the Priest of Duklja). Београд-Загреб: Српска краљевска академија.
- Кунчер, Драгана (2009). Gesta Regum Sclavorum. Vol. 1. Београд-Никшић: Историјски институт, Манастир Острог.
- Живковић, Тибор (2009). Gesta Regum Sclavorum. Vol. 2. Београд-Никшић: Историјски институт, Манастир Острог.
- Anna Comnena, The Alexiad, translated by Elizabeth A. Dawes in 1928
- John Kinnamos, The Deeds of John and Manuel Comnenus, trans. C.M. Brand (New York, 1976). ISBN 0-231-04080-6

Secondary sources

- Bataković, Dušan T., ed. (2005). Histoire du peuple serbe [History of the Serbian People] (in French). Lausanne: L’Age d’Homme. ISBN 9782825119587.
- Ćirković, Sima (2004). The Serbs. Malden: Blackwell Publishing. ISBN 9781405142915.
- Fine, John V. A. Jr. (1991) [1983]. The Early Medieval Balkans: A Critical Survey from the Sixth to the Late Twelfth Century. Ann Arbor: University of Michigan Press. ISBN 0-472-08149-7.
- Ivanišević, Vujadin; Krsmanović, Bojana (2013). "Byzantine Seals from the Ras Fortress" (PDF). Зборник радова Византолошког института. 50 (1): 449–460.
- Komatina, Ivana (2015). "Srpski vladari u Aleksijadi - hronološki okviri delovanja" [Serbian rulers in the Alexiad - some chronological notes] (PDF). ZRVI. LII.
- Imperii Graeci Historia, ed. Hieronymus Wolf, 1557, in Greek with parallel Latin translation. (PDF of 1593 reprint)
- Живковић, Тибор (2005). "Једна хипотеза о пореклу великог жупана Уроша I" (PDF). Историјски часопис. 52: 9–22.
- Živković, Tibor (2008). Forging unity: The South Slavs between East and West 550-1150. Belgrade: The Institute of History, Čigoja štampa. ISBN 9788675585732.

Vukan Vojislavljević dynasty/Vukanović dynasty Born: ~1050 Died: 1112
Regnal titles
Preceded by Constantine Bodin seat at Duklja	Grand Prince of Serbia; 1091–1112	Succeeded by Uroš I
Royal titles
Preceded by Petrislav	Župan of Raška under Constantine Bodin; 1083–1091 with Marko	Grand Prince
