= Siege of Palermo (1071–1072) =

Norman siege in Sicily, Italy

- Part of the Norman conquest of Southern Italy
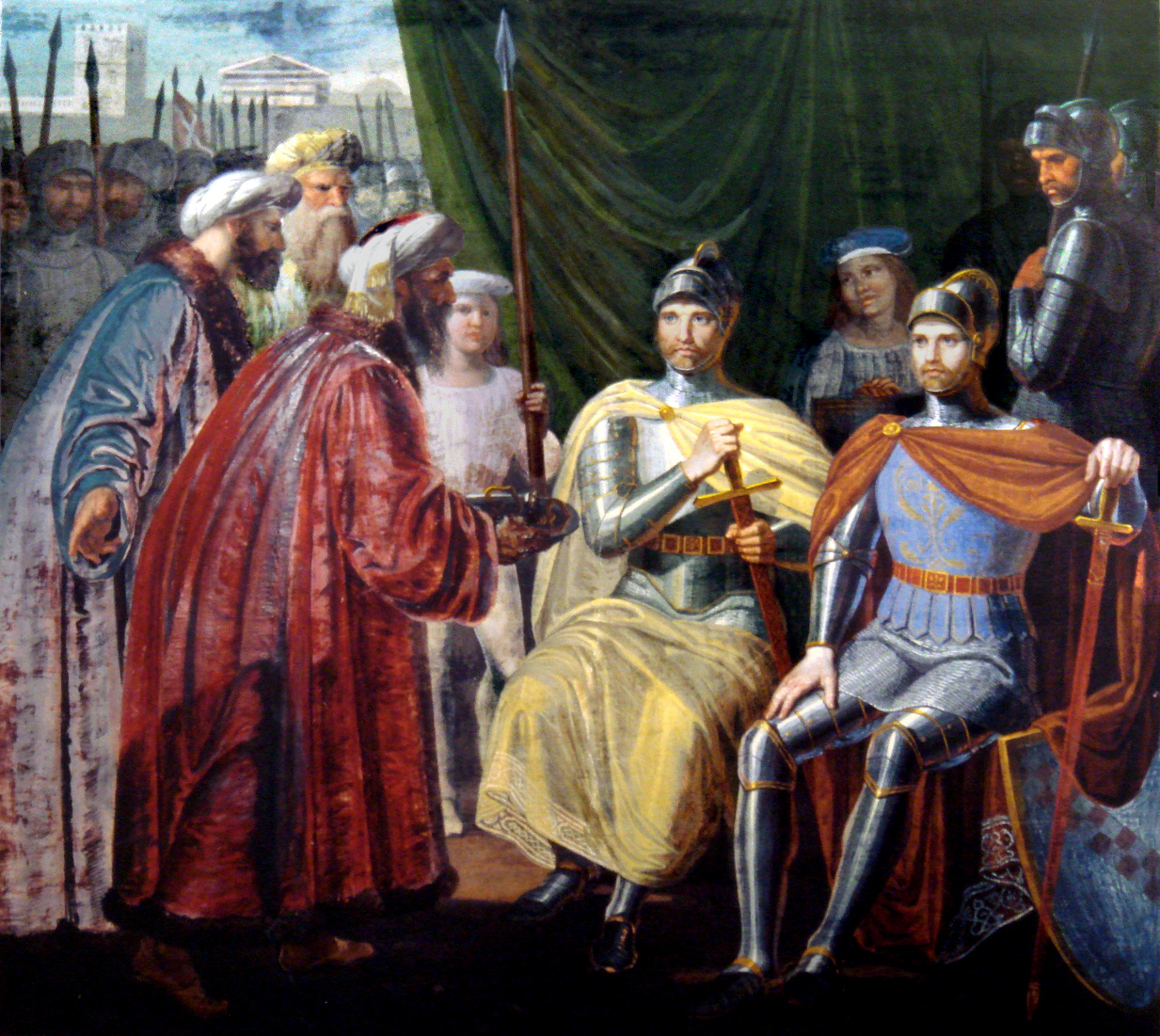
- "Roger I receiving the keys of Palermo", fresco of the vault in the "Sala Gialla" of the Palazzo dei Normanni. Work by Giuseppe Patania, 1830 ca.
Date	August 1071 – January 10, 1072
Location	Palermo, Sicily (present-day Italy)
Result	Norman victory

Belligerents
Normans	Zirids; Kalbids

Commanders and leaders
Robert Guiscard; Roger of Hauteville; Archifrede	Ibn al-Ba'ba †; Zakkār ibn 'Ammār; 2 unnamed leaders (surrendered)

Strength
~10,000 men 50–58 ships: 10–18 catti (Note: A catta, according to Bennett, in "Norman Naval Activity in the Mediterranean, 1060-1108", is a transport ship, while the 40 other ships are most likely galleys. Every catta could carry about 70 men.); 40 galleys	Unknown, but inferior Sicilian-Tunisian fleet (of unknown size)

Casualties and losses
Unknown, but moderate	Unknown, but heavy

The Siege of Palermo was carried out by the Normans under the command of Robert Guiscard and Roger of Hauteville against the Muslim-held city of Palermo. Although the Normans had begun their conquest of Sicily several years earlier, their advance was initially hampered by a shortage of troops and only gained momentum from 1071 onwards. The fall of Palermo, achieved through the deployment of a large army and the support of a powerful fleet in operations that lasted from August 1071 to January 1072, marked the end of Muslim rule in western Sicily. Following the conquest, the inhabitants of Palermo were permitted to continue practising their faith and to retain their property.

== Background ==
The Normans began their conquest of Sicily from 1060 onwards but faced significant difficulties, primarily due to lack of manpower. Some primary sources—such as Amatus of Montecassino—relate that Robert Guiscard was determined to conquer Sicily starting in 1059. By the mid-11th century, Palermo was the largest city in Sicily and one of the major commercial and cultural centres of the Muslim world, second only to Cairo and Córdoba, with a population estimated at around 100,000. (Note: Norwich gives a figure of 250,000 people. Lopez, in "The Norman Conquest of Sicily", citing different sources, concludes that the population could have numbered between 250,000 and 350,000 people. However, he deemes these sources as exaggerated and gives his own figure of "well over 100,000 inhabitants".) The city could host up to 500 mosques. A first Norman attempt to seize Palermo occurred in 1064. Robert had mustered 500 knights and 1,000 more men to fight, but that attempt too had ended in failure when their camp became infested with tarantulas. This incident led Roger of Hauteville, who alongside his brother Robert Guiscard was a key proponent of Norman expansion, to refuse participation in the Pisan initiative to attack Palermo in 1063, believing himself unable to sustain such an assault. (Note: The result of the Pisan attack varies in modern sources. Brown considers it a propaganda victory, adding "the raid was scarcely a significant setback for the rulers and merchants of the Sicilian capital", while Norwich, citing Geoffrey Malaterra, states that the Pisans achieved a major victory, gathering much booty. Indeed, according to Krueger, in "The Italian Cities and the Arabs before 1095", the Pisans "destroyed the Saracen arsenal, burned five merchantmen, and used the booty from a sixth to start construction of their duomo, Santa Maria Maggiore".)

The Norman army was exhausted after 3 years of combat. However, the situation changed after the siege of Bari from 1068 to 1071; with the fall of the last major Byzantine outpost in southern Italy, the two Norman leaders turned their attention to Palermo. From Messina, their only major stronghold on the island, they devised an alternative strategy which, instead of advancing along the western coast, focused on capturing Catania, a city that fell to them through the use of a clever ruse. In the summer of 1071, Roger and Robert divided their forces: Roger led the land army, while Robert, perhaps weakened by his age and the oppressive heat, assumed command of the fleet that would support the operation. On the way, Roger captured Catania, four days after his arrival, and stole some of its fleet from the qaid of the city, Ibn Timnah.

== Preparations ==
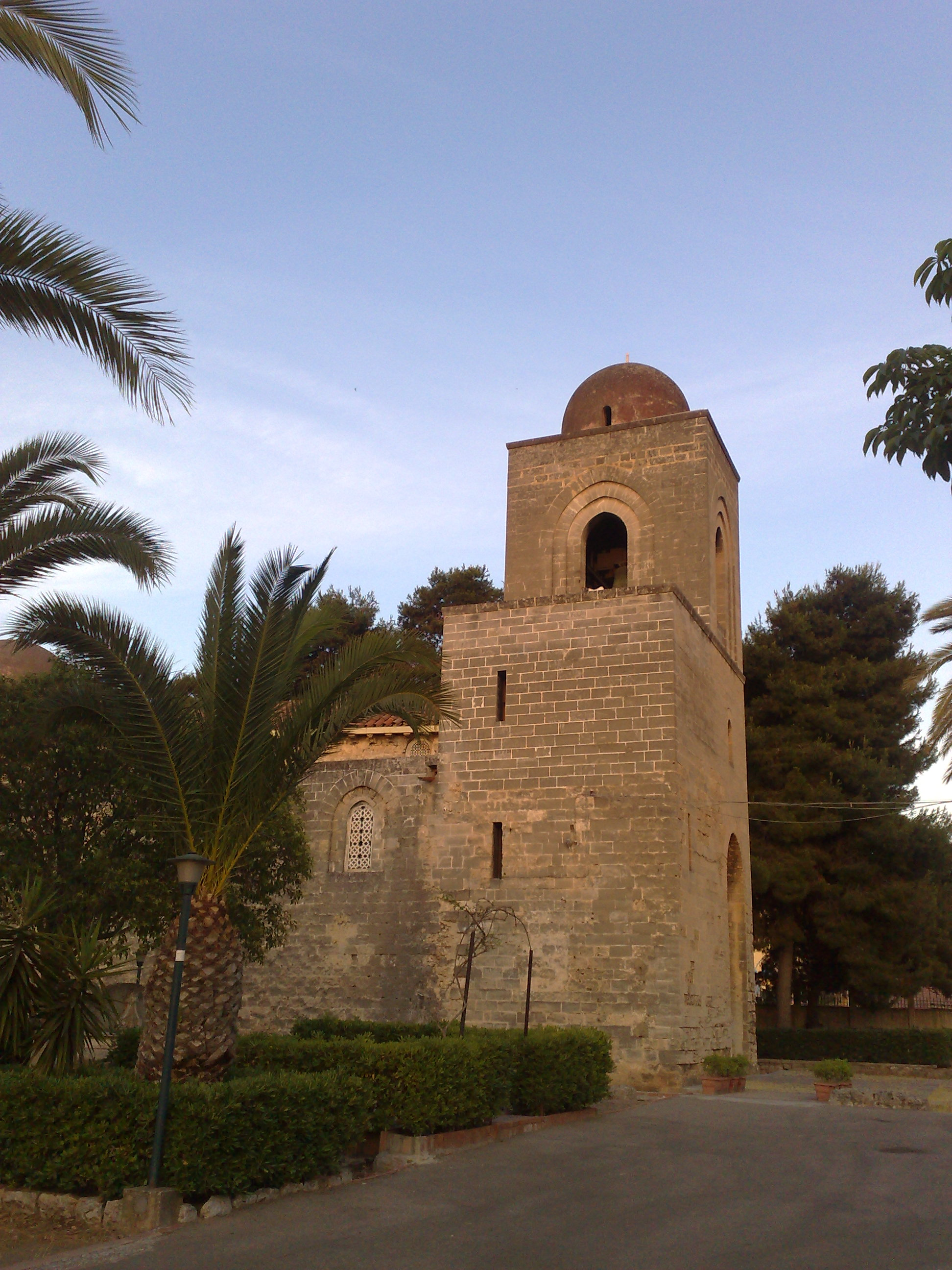
San Giovanni dei Lebbrosi, at the time Castle of Yahya until its transformation into a Church by the Normans.

The fleet that Robert mustered could have numbered between 50 and 58 ships—of those, 10 were transport ships, 40 were galleys. In mid-August, Roger arrived with the bulk of the Norman army before the walls of Palermo. Encountering no significant resistance on his march from Catania, he decided to encamp three or four kilometres east of the city, where the Oreto River flows into the sea. To secure a landing site, the Normans advanced towards the Castle of Yahya, located near the river’s mouth. This fortification served a dual purpose: it protected the eastern approach to Palermo and blocked the waterway to prevent enemy ships from sailing upstream. The Norman forces overcame the local garrison without much difficulty, killing fifteen defenders and capturing thirty others; the castle was later converted into a church, known today as San Giovanni dei Lebbrosi.

Shortly afterwards, Robert arrived with his fleet and ordered an immediate attack. His arrival in late August marked the start of the siege. Until now, the Normans couldn't manage to achieve a major victory due to shortage of troops—as seen in the three-month attempted siege of Palermo in 1064. However, now numbering fewer than 10,000 men, the Normans found themselves engaged in another massive assault.

In Sicily, the ruler was a certain Ibn al-Ba'ba. He appears to have rose in power in May 1068, and he even appointed a second in command, Zakkār ibn 'Ammār, as nagid of the Jewish community in Palermo.

== Siege ==
=== Naval engagement ===
As the galleys advanced to block the entrance to the port, the army moved forward in a wide arc: Roger led the left flank, advancing northwest, while Robert commanded the right, pushing westward along the coast. Meanwhile, the inhabitants of Palermo prepared to resist the assault. They had reinforced their fortifications and walled up all but two or three of the city gates. When the Norman vanguard approached the defences, they were met with a hail of arrows and stones intended to drive them back.

This time, Robert Guiscard did not repeat the tactics he had employed at Bari, where his attempt to surround the port had been thwarted by a Byzantine breakout. Stationed along the Oreto, Robert swiftly launched an attack when a Sicilian-Tunisian fleet of unknown size arrived to reinforce Palermo in the autumn of 1071, as retold by William of Apulia. The Muslim forces attempted to hinder the Normans by erecting large red felt tents on their ships to shield themselves from incoming missiles. Nevertheless, the Normans gradually gained the upper hand, forcing the enemy vessels to retreat and allowing the Norman fleet to approach the port. Just before they reached it, the defenders stretched a great chain across the harbour entrance to replace the one removed by the Pisans eight years earlier. Although the precise means remain unclear, Guiscard managed to break through this obstacle and, advancing close to the shore, set fire to most of the Sicilian fleet. Without the navy, the city couldn't be supplied. However, the claim of William of Apulia is probably inflated, as Amatus of Montecassino states the capture of only two vessels. The same historian claims that several defenders were lured outside the walls with bread, and then made prisoner.

=== In the citadel ===
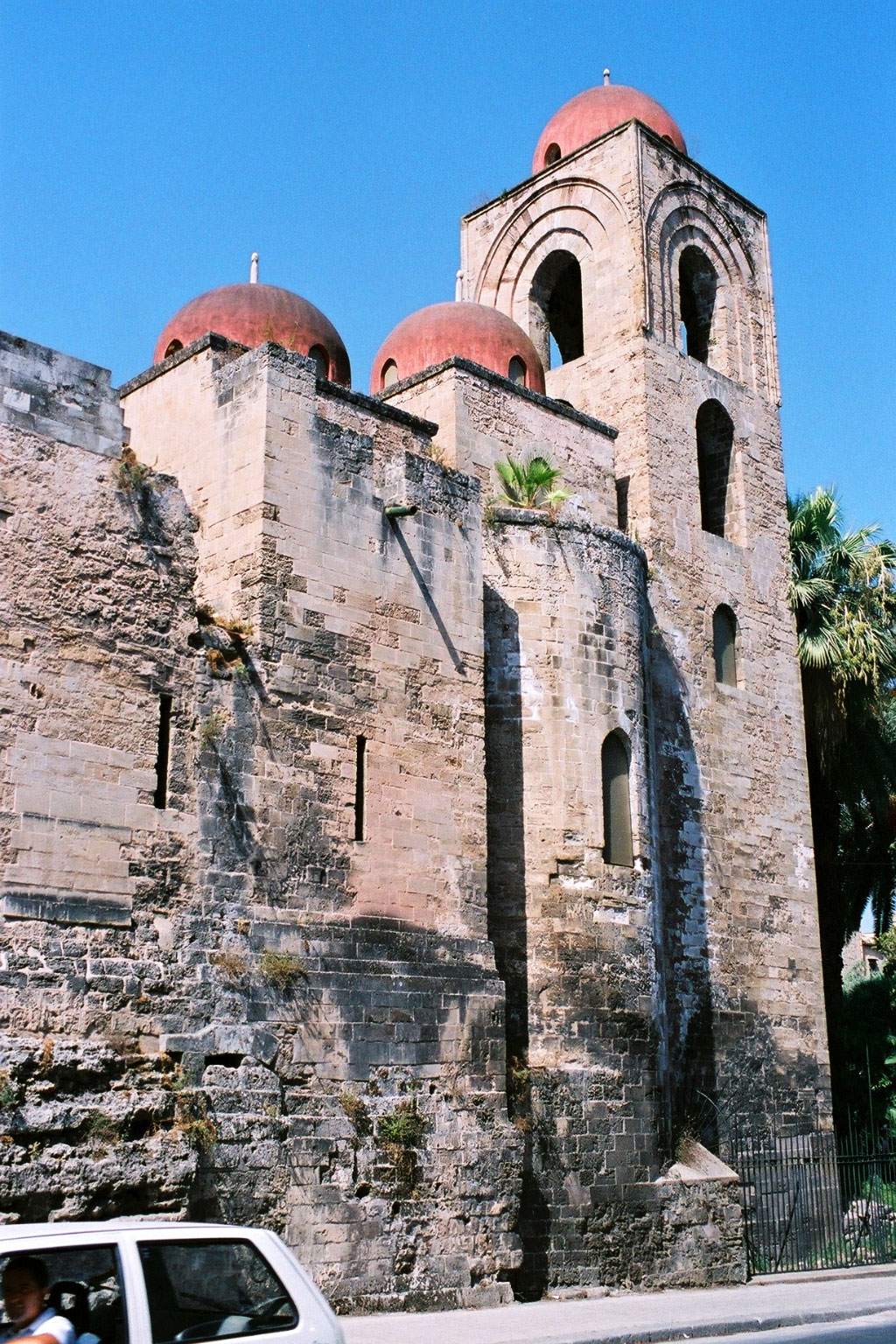
The Church of San Giovanni degli Eremiti, building that was constructed in the Arab era.

As the months passed, the threat of famine became increasingly severe, with supplies difficult to obtain due to the blockade of all exit routes. The hills of the Conca d'Oro, which encircled the capital and formed a natural barrier, now proved a disadvantage: Roger’s forces blocked every route to the south and east, while his mobile patrols intercepted relief and supply columns to the west, and Robert’s ships prevented any resupply by sea to the north. Under such conditions, surrender seemed inevitable, but in December events took an unexpected turn. Robert learned of a rebellion that had erupted in Apulia and spread to Calabria, threatening to escalate further if his absence continued. At the heart of the old city lay the district of Al-Qasr ("The Fortress"), a crowded market area with numerous souks clustered around the great Friday mosque, protected by circular walls punctuated with nine gates. At dawn on 5 January 1072, Guiscard’s infantry launched an assault on this district, sparking a prolonged and bloody battle. Drawing on their desperation, the defenders threw themselves fiercely at the attackers, ultimately prevailing through sheer determination and superior numbers. When the infantry was forced to retreat, the Norman cavalry charged forward with overwhelming force, reversing the tide of battle. As the defenders fell back towards the walls, the guards atop them chose to close the gates to prevent the Normans from entering as well, trapping their own men outside. The isolated Saracen forces continued to fight until they were all killed. Robert then ordered one of the seven large siege ladders to be raised. Amatus of Montecassino gives a different account of fourteen total ladders.

After some hesitation, on January 7, he managed to rally a group led by a certain Archifrede to scale the walls, but the defenders repelled them and they were forced to retreat. Seeing that Al-Qasr remained unbreached, Guiscard decided to change tactics, reasoning that the concentration of guards there must have left other sectors undermanned. He ordered his troops to continue feigning attacks on the fortress while he personally led 300 picked soldiers northeast, towards Al-Khalesa, the administrative centre of Palermo, situated between Al-Qasr and the sea. Al-Khalesa was largely composed of public buildings—the arsenal, prisons, government offices, and the emir's divan at its centre—and was far less fortified, with few defenders remaining due to their deployment elsewhere. The Normans quickly raised their ladders, and a first group climbed over the walls, opening the gates to admit the rest of the 300 warriors. Despite gaining entry, they faced fierce resistance and only secured victory thanks to their long Norman swords, which proved decisive in the close combat. By nightfall, the fighting had subsided, and the surviving defenders fled through streets littered with corpses. However, in contrast to what happened to Jerusalem after it was taken by the Crusaders in 1099, the population wasn't entirely massacred, although Amatus of Montecassino implies that the Normans killed quite a few of citizens, both men and women, as they fought their way into the city. Sometime during this last assault, the commander of the garrison of the city, Ibn al-Ba'ba, seems to have handed Palermo over to the Normans, but was refused and killed. What happened to Zakkār ibn 'Ammār, however, is unknown.

=== Surrender ===
During the night of January 10, the defenders of Palermo realised that all hope was lost following the enemy’s entry into the city, as famine and discord slowly undermined the morale. Consequently, in the early hours of the next morning, they approached Robert to negotiate the terms of surrender. The negotiations were led by two unnamed qaids, further corrobating the absence of Ibn al-Ba'ba. Robert responded with understanding, promising that there would be no reprisals or further looting and that the lives and properties, both movable and immovable, of the Saracens would be respected. He also guaranteed them freedom of religion. In return, he required their support in future military campaigns and the payment of an annual tribute. His swift acceptance of these terms was influenced by his urgent need to return to the mainland to suppress the ongoing revolts.

== Concequences ==
On January 10, 1072, Robert Guiscard made his triumphal entry into Palermo, accompanied by his brother Roger, his wife Sikelgaita, and all the Norman leaders who had fought alongside him during the campaign. Robert's entry into the Old City was marked by the removal of all Islamic symbols from the main mosque, which was subsequently converted into a Christian cathedral. This act symbolised not only a religious transformation but also the replacement of the Islamic aristocracy with one of a different faith. Nonetheless, a large part of the population remained Muslim and, in what scholars consider a prudent decision, was allowed to continue practising its faith freely. Beyond the futility of provoking hostility among the Saracens towards their new rulers, Levi Roach observed that this was not "a holy war" but rather, "like the conquest of England by Duke William, an opportunistic appropriation of lands with the blessing of the Pope". It should be remembered that although chroniclers such as William of Apulia and Geoffrey Malaterra emphasised the religious aspect of these conflicts, they were writing in the context of the First Crusade, which had already taken place by then.

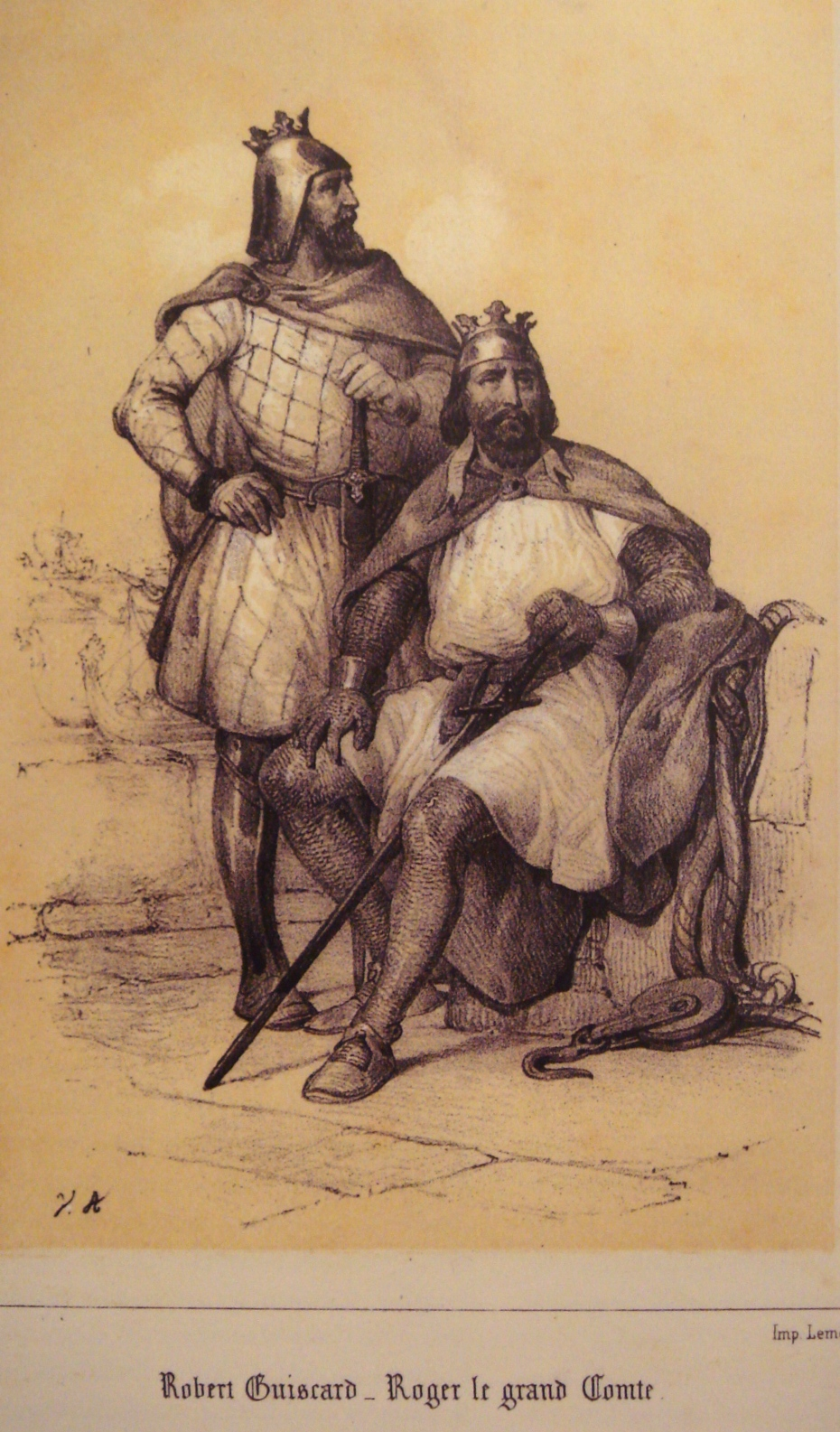
Fantasy portrait of the brothers Robert Guiscard (left) and Roger of Hauteville (right).

In the aftermath of the battles, Robert Guiscard confirmed his sovereignty over the newly formed County of Sicily, reserving for himself as direct domains the city of Palermo, half of Messina, and the Val Demone, the mountainous region in the northeast whose conquest he had personally led. All the remaining territories were granted to his great vassal Roger, who was henceforth invested with the title of Great Count of Sicily and recognised as the rightful owner of any additional lands he might conquer. Robert spent the summer of 1072 in Palermo, where he appointed one of his principal lieutenants with the title of emir, thereby adopting a local administrative custom. The capture of Sicily's largest city, wrested gradually from Muslim control over a decade, marked the zenith of Guiscard's conquests.

== Historical assessment ==
According to John Julius Norwich, the capture of Palermo was considerably more difficult than that of Bari, as the Saracens frequently launched raids and diversionary attacks, seeking to exploit the element of unpredictability to their advantage. Reflecting on this historical episode, Norwich wrote:

"For the Saracens of Sicily, [the fall of Palermo] marked the end of their political independence, but also the beginning of an age of unprecedented order and peace during which, under a strong but benevolent central government such as they themselves had never been able to achieve, their artistic and scientific gifts would be encouraged and appreciated as never before. For the Normans it became the foundation-stone of their new political philosophy, enabling them to build up a state that for the next hundred years would stand to the world as an example of culture and enlightenment, giving them an understanding and breadth of outlook which was to be the envy of civilised Europe".

— Norwich, John Julius. The Normans in Sicily: The Normans in the South 1016-1130 and the Kingdom in the Sun 1130-1194, p. 193.

According to Brown, Robert's mercy in the terms of surrender did not sit well with some of his soldiers, as some of them wanted booty or were offended by his tolerance. Emphasizing the victory, and also describing the Normans after the event, he wrote:

"Amidst the color and pageantry of the mass [the celebrations in Palermo of January 10], Roger and Robert had time to consider how kindly fortune had dealt with them over the past year. The capture of Bari, and now Palermo, had put them within easy reach of fulfilling their dreams at Melfi just over twelve years earlier: the dukedom of Apulia, Calabria and Sicily was now a fleshed-out and powerful reality. The Hautevilles had become the key strategic figures of the entire region: they had spearheaded a revival of the Latin Church in southern Italy, and returned Sicily to the faith after centuries of Muslim rule. Although their days of cattle thieving and petty extortion in Calabria were still a present memory, they had risen to join the ranks of the most powerful and richest men in Italy.".

— Brown, Gordon S. The Norman Conquest of Southern Italy and Sicily, pp. 146–147.

According to Theotokis, in "The Norman Invasion of Sicily, 1061–1072", after Palermo’s fall, "Muslims stopped offering the Normans a chance to give pitched battle and locked themselves up in their heavily fortified cities and castles, in 1072, the Norman expansion dragged on for 20 more years". Indeed, the struggle for Sicily continued until either 1090 or 1091, when the last Muslim stronghold on the island, Noto, fell to the Normans. (Note: Cobb states 1090, while Loud mentions February 1091. Metcalfe reaches the same conclusion. Green, citing Geoffrey Malaterra, includes both dates in his work.)

Reflecting on the entire period, Metcalfe, in "The Muslims of Medieval Italy", wrote:

"The third time during the eleventh century that invasion forces from the south Italian mainland landed on Sicily came with the Norman conquest from the 1060s. The enduring consequences of this phase for central Mediterranean history are hard to overstate. By 1072 Palermo had fallen; by 1091 the conquest was complete; and in 1130 Sicily and the south Italian peninsula were fused into a single political entity that retained a declining Muslim population for almost two centuries. The kingdom came to be split with the Treaty of Caltabellotta, ending the Wars of the Sicilian Vespers in 1302, but it survived, more or less, as a political unit until 1861 when it was incorporated into the unified kingdom of Italy in the wake of the Risorgimento movement.".

— Metcalfe, Alexander, in "The Muslims of Medieval Italy". Islam and Christian-Muslim Relations, p. 88.

== See also ==
- Norman conquest of Southern Italy
- Normans
- Byzantine-Norman Wars
- First Crusade

== Bibliography ==
- Theotokis, Georgios (2010). "The Norman Invasion of Sicily, 1061–1072: Numbers and Military Tactics". War in History. 17 (4): 381–402. doi:10.1177/0968344510376463. S2CID 159817615.
- Setton, Kenneth Meyer, ed. (1969). A History of the Crusades. Vol. 1. University of Wisconsin Press. ISBN 978-0-299-04834-1.
  - Krueger, Hilmar C. "The Italian Cities and the Arabs before 1095". In Setton (1969), pp. 40–53.
  - Lopez, Robert S. "The Norman Conquest of Sicily". In Setton (1969), pp. 54–67.
- Bennett, Matthew (1992). "Norman Naval Activity in the Mediterranean, 1060-1108". Anglo-Norman Studies. 15: 41–58. ISSN 0261-9857.
- Loud, Graham A. (2008). The Deeds of Robert Guiscard by William of Apulia. OCLC 1184547282 – via White Rose Research Online.
- Loud, Graham A. (2013). The Age of Robert Guiscard: Southern Italy and the Northern Conquest. Routledge. ISBN 978-0-582-04529-3.
- Norwich, John Julius (1992). The Normans in Sicily: The Normans in the South 1016-1130 and the Kingdom in the Sun 1130-1194. Penguin Global. ISBN 978-0-140-15212-8.
- Winkler, Emily A.; Fitzgerald, Liam, eds. (2021). The Normans in the Mediterranean. Brepols. ISBN 978-2-503-59057-8. ISSN 2565-8654.
  - Jäckh, Theresa. "Palermo and the Norman Conquest of Sicily". In Winkler & Fitzgerald (2021), pp. 176–210.
- Roach, Levi (2022). Empires of the Normans: Conquerors of Europe. Pegasus Books. ISBN 978-1-639-36188-5.
- Brown, Gordon S. (2002). The Norman Conquest of Southern Italy and Sicily. McFarland, Incorporated, Publishers. ISBN 978-0-786-41472-7.
- Cobb, P. (2014). The Race for Paradise: An Islamic History of the Crusades. Oxford University Press. ISBN 978-0-19-953201-8.
- Green, Judith A. (2022). The Normans: Power, Conquest and Culture in 11th-century Europe. Yale University Press. ISBN 978-0-300-18996-4.
- Metcalfe, Alexander (2009). "The Muslims of Medieval Italy". Islam and Christian-Muslim Relations. 23 (1). Edinburgh University Press. doi:10.1515/9780748629114. ISBN 978-0-7486-2008-1.
