= Bisantius Guirdeliku =

Bisantius Guirdeliku (or Bysantius Guinderlichus) was a noble citizen of Bari, then the capital of the Byzantine catepanate of Italy. He held the rank of patrikios. During the siege of Bari (1068–71) by the Normans, he led the faction opposed to surrender until he was assassinated by his rival, Argirizzo, in 1070. His nickname is known from the anonymous Annales Barenses and the chronicle of Lupus Protospatharius.

The Norman siege began in September 1068. Shortly after—or, according to William of Apulia, shortly before—Bisantius set out for the Byzantine capital, Constantinople, to request military assistance from the Emperor Romanos IV. The Norman leader, Robert Guiscard, advised of Bisantius' mission by Argirizzo, leader of the pro-Norman faction, sent a flotilla of four galleys after him. In the ensuing naval battle, two of the galleys were sunk and the other two fled, allowing Bisantius to reach Constantinople.

Romanos IV sent a relief force under Stephen Pateranos. It managed to break the Norman blockade and enter the harbour of Bari only after suffering severe losses. Bisantius was among those who made it into Bari. Emboldened by the Byzantine military presence, he began a war of words with Argirizzo which sometimes devolved into skirmishing in the streets between their factions. Matters came to a head on Sunday, 18 July 1070, when assassins hired by Argirizzo murdered Bisantius. That did not, however, end the resistance to the siege, which continued until the city surrendered on 15 April 1071. The Ystoire de li Normant of Amatus of Montecassino provides the most details about the feud between Bisantius and Argirizzo during the siege. The exact day of Bisantius' death is supplied by the Anonymi Barensis Chronicon, which attributes his murder to "evil men" and does not name Argirizzo. It says that the house of Malapezzi, the governor of Bari, was burnt and torn down the same day.
