= Longibardopoulos =

- Military career
- Allegiance: Byzantine army (?–1071; 1073–?); Serbian army (1072–73)
- Service years: fl. 1072
- Conflicts: Uprising of Georgi Voiteh (1072)

Longibardopoulos (Greek: Λογγιβαρδόπουλος, "son of the Lombard"; fl. 1071–1073) was a Byzantine general, a mercenary chief, one of the commanders stationed in Macedonia during the Uprising of Georgi Voiteh (1072).

== Life ==
A Lombard chief, or possibly Italo-Norman, he joined the Byzantine army rather than submit to the Normans during their conquest of southern Italy.

In 1072, an uprising was prepared by the Bulgarian and Slavic nobility in Skopje led by Georgi Voiteh, known in modern historiography as the Uprising of Georgi Voiteh. The rebels chose Constantine Bodin, a Serbian prince, the son of Michael I of Duklja, as their leader, as he was a maternal descendant of the Bulgarian Emperor Samuil; in the autumn of 1072 Constantine Bodin arrived at Prizren, where he was proclaimed Emperor of the Bulgarians. A Byzantine army under Damianos Dalassenos was immediately sent from Constantinople to help the strategos of the Theme of Bulgaria, Nikephoros Karantenos. In the battle that followed the Byzantine army was completely defeated. Dalassenos and several other Byzantine commanders, including Longibardopoulos, were captured and Skopje was taken by the rebel troops.

Longibardopoulos was subsequently married to a sister of Constantine Bodin, and was put in command of an army consisting mainly of "Lombards and Serbs". He was dispatched against the Byzantines, whom he had earlier served.

Despite some initial success, Bodin was subsequently captured at Taonion or Pauni (in southern Kosovo), in December 1073 and then sent to Constantinople, then Antioch, where he spent several years, while Voiteh died en route. When Michael of Duklja heard of the capture of his son, he sent Longibardopoulos to rescue him, but instead, Longibardopoulos defected to the Byzantines.
