= Argyritzos =

Argyritzos (Note: William of Apulia calls him Argiricius. In modern Italian he is Argirizzo di Giovannacio or Giovannicio, the latter being his father's name.) (fl. 1071–81) was one of the leading citizens of Bari during the final years of Byzantine rule. He held the rank of protospatharios under the empire. His father was named Ioannakes.

When the Normans besieged Bari in 1068–71, Argyritzos led the faction that favoured seeking terms. On 18 July 1070, the leader of the opposite faction, Bisantius Guirdeliku, was assassinated through the "treachery" of Argyritzos, according to the Annales Barenses and the Annales Lupi Protospatharii. Still, the city held out for another nine months. Argyritzos appears to have inherited a leading position following its surrender on favourable terms to the Norman leader Robert Guiscard.

According to the chronicler William of Apulia, Robert "entrusted the city" to Argyritzos. If he did, it was short-lived. By 1075, the city's governors were one Lizius the viscount, probably a Norman, and Maurelianus the catepan, a local with the imperial rank of patrikios.

In 1078, Argyritzos arranged the marriage of his daughter to Abelard, Robert's nephew, who was planning a rebellion. The revolt broke out on 3 February 1079. Robert re-captured Bari the following year and in April 1081 Argyritzos fled to the court of King Mihailo Vojislavljević of Duklja, a Byzantine vassal. There he arranged the marriage of his daughter Jaquinta to Mihailo's son Bodin.

The date of Argyritzos' death is unknown. An epitaph for a Kyri (Lord) Ioannatius in the church of Santa Maria de' Sannaci in Gioia del Colle, a suburb of Bari, has been identified as his.

== Sources ==
- Živković, Vojislav (2025). "About the First Contacts of Serbs and Normans: Archiriz of Bari, Father-in-law of King Constantine Bodin". Vizantijsko-slovenska čtenija. 8: 151–164.
