= King of the Slavs =

King of the Slavs (Latin: rex Sclavorum, Sclavorum rex) was a title denoting some Slavic rulers, as well as Germanic rulers that conquered Slavs, in the Middle Ages in European sources, such as Papal correspondence.

Papal use is bolded.

- Samo, established a tribal polity of various Slavic tribes (623–658); according to the Chronicle of Fredegar and was called King of the Slavs according to later reworkings of this account
- Drogoviz, ruler of the Veleti (789); in Annales Mettenses priores in c. 805
- Trpimir I, ruler of Duchy of Croatia (845–864); erroneously by Gottschalk in the 840s
- **Svatopluk I of Moravia**, ruler of Great Moravia (870–894); by Pope Stephen V in 885
- Michael, ruler of Zachlumia (913–926); erroneously in the Annales Barenses
- **Mihailo Vojislavljević**, ruler of Duklja (1050–1081); by Pope Gregory VII in 1077
- Constantine Bodin (Bodin Vojislavljević), ruler of Duklja (1081–1101); by the chronicle of Orderic Vitalis, relating to events of 1096
- Canute Lavard, Danish prince (1120–1131); by Abbott Wilhelm after 1129
- Canute VI, King of Denmark; by himself in 1185, after a conquest of Pomerania
- **Stefan Dragutin**, ruler of Kingdom of Serbia (1276–1282) and Syrmia (Realm of Stefan Dragutin; 1282–1316); by Pope Nicholas IV in 1288

== See also ==
- King of the Wends

== Sources ==
- Ćirković, Sima (2004). The Serbs. Malden: Blackwell Publishing. ISBN 9781405142915.
- Jireček, Constantin (1911). Geschichte der Serben. Vol. 1. Gotha: Perthes.
