= Leo Passianos =

Leo Passianos (died 22 June 1017) was the Byzantine general sent by the Catapan of Italy Leo Tornikios Kontoleon to fight the Lombard rebel Melus of Bari in 1017. He is not to be confused with the other Passianos killed in Melus' first rebellion while fighting the Saracens under Ishmael of Montepeloso.

Passianos met Melus on the Fortore at Arenula. The battle was either indecisive (William of Apulia) or a victory for Melus (Leo of Ostia). Tornikios then took command himself and led them into a second encounter near Civita. This second battle was a victory for Melus, though Lupus Protospatharius and the anonymous chronicler of Bari record a defeat. Passianos was killed in this battle.

== Sources ==
- Chalandon, Ferdinand. Histoire de la domination normande en Italie et en Sicile. Paris, 1907.
