= Kontoleon Tornikios =

Kontoleon Tornikios was the Catapan of Italy from May to September 1017. He was originally the strategos of Cephallenia. As strategos, he accompanied the catapan Basil Mesardonites to Apulia in 1011. Basil died in 1016 and Leo was nominated to replace him, arriving in May. At the time, Melus of Bari had risen in revolt again, this time with a band of Normans. Leo sent Leo Passianos with an army against him. Passianos and Melus met on the Fortore at Arenula. The battle was either indecisive (William of Apulia) or a victory for Melus (Leo of Ostia). Tornikios then took command himself and led them into a second encounter near Civita. The second battle was a victory for Melus, though Lupus Protospatharius and the anonymous chronicler of Bar record a defeat. A third battle, a decisive victory for Melus, occurred at Vaccaricia, near the site of later Troia. The entire region from the Fortore to Trani had fallen to Melus and in September, Tornikios was relieved of his duties in favour of Basil Boioannes.

== Sources ==
- Chalandon, Ferdinand. Histoire de la domination normande en Italie et en Sicile. Paris, 1907.

Preceded by Basil Mesardonites	Catepan of Italy; May 1017– Sept. 1017	Succeeded by Basil Boioannes
