= Stephen Pateranos =

Stephen Pateranos was a Byzantine general who served as the final Catepan of Italy.

By 1071, the Catepanate of Italy was severely reduced, with only a few holdings left and their capital besieged by the Normans. According to the Anonymus Barensis, Romanos IV, the reigning Byzantine Emperor, sent twenty ships under command of Joscelin of Molfetta, a Norman rebel, along with Pateranos, to relieve Bari. However, the Normans intercepted and scattered the fleet off the coast of Bari, and captured the ship carrying Joscelin, though Stephen was able to reach the city. Stephen realized that defense of the city was impossible, and sent Argyritzos, a local noble, to offer peace. The Normans accepted peace, and Bari surrendered.

Stephen was imprisoned by the Normans, but was allowed later to return to Byzantium with other survivors.

== Sources ==
- William of Apulia (1096–99). "The Deeds of Robert Guiscard" (DOC). University of Leeds.
- Alexander Vasiliev. "The time of troubles (1056-1081)". A History of the Byzantine Empire. Ellopus.

Preceded by Perenos	Catepan of Italy	Norman conquest of southern Italy
