= Jaquinta of Bari =

Jaquinta (Serbian Cyrillic: Јаквинта, romanized: Jakvinta; fl. 1081 – 1118) was a queen consort of Dioclea by marriage to king Constantine Bodin. She is best known for her role in the Dioclean civil war, where she violently intervened in a succession crisis following the death of her husband, Constantine Bodin.

== Life ==
Jaquinta was the daughter of Argyritzos (Archirizus), the Norman governor of Bari in the County of Apulia. The Dioclean king Michael I selected her as wife for his son Constantine Bodin, recently returned from captivity in Antioch, shortly after his coronation in 1077. According to the Annales Barenses, the two wed in April 1078, but the marriage may have taken place any time after. The union cemented the alliance between Dioclea and Norman Sicily against the Byzantine Empire. The couple's sons were Michael, George, Archiriz and Thomas.

=== Queenship ===
Michael died in 1081 and was succeeded as king by Constantine. Queen Jaquinta was a "powerful force and significant influence"; the Chronicle of the Priest of Duklja portrays her as the power behind the throne. She saw Michael's nephew Branislav as a threat to her husband and children. Her sons were young (less than 15 or 10 years of age) and thus in a weak position; Jaquinta feared that if Constantine died before they reached majority, Branislav would usurp the throne. She urged her husband to imprison him, and the opportunity was seized when Branislav arrived to the capital Skadar unattended with his brother and son. Branislav died soon after, but six of his brothers and six of his sons were still at liberty. They were granted asylum by the Republic of Ragusa. After Ragusa refused to expel them, Constantine started a siege of the city, during which a favourite of the queen was killed. Enraged, she convinced her husband to have Branislav's imprisoned brother and son beheaded before the city walls; church authorities eventually mediated peace, but Branislav's exiled family continued to seek revenge.

=== Succession crisis ===
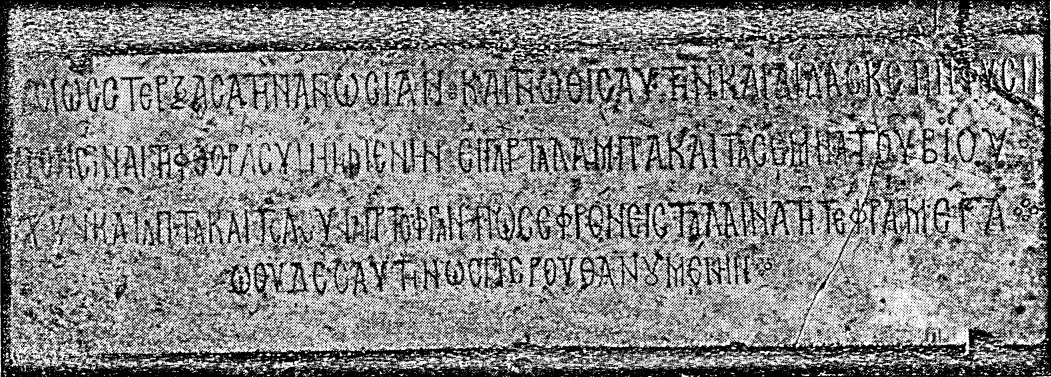
A partial maledictory inscription found in the cathedral of Bari is sometimes considered a mocking epitaph of Jaquinta. This is unlikely, since she was not buried there and did not live in the city most of her adult life.

By the time her husband died c. 1101, Queen Jaquinta was the most hated member of the feuding royal family. A war of succession ensued, with the dowager fighting for her minor son Michael against Constantine's four half-brothers. Jaquinta's nephew Vladimir prevailed in 1103, but she continued to intrigue on behalf of her progeny, this time George. In 1118, in Kotor, she gave Vladimir a dose of a slow-working poison. The dying King was taken to Skadar, where she followed him in order to make sure of her son's accession. There Jaquinta accused her brother-in-law Dobroslav, deposed and imprisoned during the 1101–03 succession crisis. Unconvinced, Vladimir expelled her from Skadar. Jaquinta expected Dobroslav to be released and restored to the throne following Vladimir's imminent death. Thus, as soon as the king was dead, Jaquinta had her henchmen enter the jail and castrate and blind Dobroslav, who was then sent to a Skadar monastery. After George's accession, many pro-Byzantine members of the royal family fled to Dyrrachium. They soon returned in the company of a Byzantine army which ousted George and captured Jaquinta. She was taken to Constantinople, where she died imprisoned.

== Sources ==
- Živković, Vojislav (2025). "About the First Contacts of Serbs and Normans: Archiriz of Bari, Father-in-law of King Constantine Bodin". Vizantijsko-slovenska čtenija. 8: 151–164.
