= Byzantius =

Bisantius, also spelled Byzantius, Byzantios, Bisanctus, Vyzantios or Visantius, is a historical masculine given name of Greek origin.

- Byzantius (archbishop of Bari), ruled from 1025 until 1035
- Bisantius I (archbishop of Trani), ruled from 1063 until c.1100
- Bisantius II (archbishop of Trani), ruled from c.1100 until 1126
- Bisantius III (archbishop of Trani), ruled from 1142 until 1150
- Bisantius (bishop of Bisceglie), ruled from 1182 until 1220, previously abbot of Santa Maria de Columna
- Bisantius (abbot of Santa Sofia di Benevento), ruled from 1033 until 1052
- Bisantius Guirdeliku (late 11th century), leader of a municipal faction in Bari
- Byzantios (fl. c. 1175–1200), Swedish sculptor
