= Petrilo =

- Title: Vojvoda

Vojvoda Petrilo (Serbian: Војвода Петрило) was an 11th-century Serbian voivode (military commander) of the Serbian King Constantine Bodin.

Bodin was crowned as Emperor of Bulgaria in 1072 and was set to conquer the Byzantine territories of Bulgarian interest together with Georgi Voyteh (in the so-called Uprising of Georgi Voyteh or Slav Uprising in Pomoravlje in Serbian).

Petrilo led a 300-strong army towards the south, into Macedonia, and took Ohrid where the townspeople greeted him as their liberator and Devol (Kavadarci) which surrendered. He was stopped by Byzantine troops and locals at Kastoria led by a Byzantine general (of Bulgarian origin) that defeated him, making Petrilo return to Duklja.

== Sources ==
- Fine, John V. A. Jr. (1991) [1983]. The Early Medieval Balkans: A Critical Survey from the Sixth to the Late Twelfth Century. Ann Arbor: University of Michigan Press. ISBN 0-472-08149-7.
