= Constantine Bodin =

Medieval king of Duklja, and temporary of Bulgaria

- King of Slavs (titular); Tsar of Bulgaria (titular)
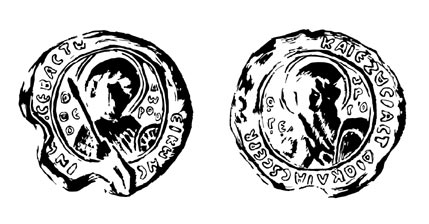
- Seal of Constantine Bodin

King of Dioclea
- Reign: 1081–1101
- Predecessor: Mihailo I
- Successor: Mihailo II
- Died: 1101
- Spouse: Jaquinta
- Issue: Mihailo II, Đorđe
- Dynasty: Vojislavljević
- Father: Mihailo
- Religion: Catholicism

Constantine Bodin (Bulgarian and Serbian: Константин Бодин, Konstantin Bodin; fl. 1072–1101) was a medieval king and the ruler of Duklja, the most powerful Serbian principality of the time, from 1081 to 1101, succeeding his father, Mihailo Vojislavljević (r. 1046–1081).

Born in peaceful times, when the South Slavs were subjects of the Byzantine Empire, his father was in 1072 approached by Bulgarian nobility, who sought aid in their revolt against the Byzantines. Mihailo sent them Bodin, who was crowned Bulgarian tsar under the name Peter (Bulgarian: Петър, Petŭr); he is therefore sometimes enumerated as Peter III (Петър ІІІ) as tsar. Bodin joined the short-lived revolt, being captured the following year after initial success. He was freed in 1078, and upon the death of his father in 1081 he succeeded to the throne of Dioclea. Having renewed his acknowledgement of Byzantine overlordship, he soon sided with their enemies, the Normans, which resulted in a Byzantine invasion and his capture. Although he quickly had himself freed, his reputation and influence waned. He was pushed aside by one of his governors, Vukan, who continued the struggle against the Byzantines.

== Early life ==
Bodin was the son of Mihailo, the ˝King of the Slavs˝, who held the Byzantine title of protospatharios. His mother was the niece of Byzantine Emperor Constantine IX Monomachos (r. 1042–1055). His father was more of a politician and statesman than warrior. Energetic and ambitious, Bodin was brought up in a period when the state enjoyed rare peace for two decades, although this did not interfere with his development of warrior qualities and abilities. He participated in the large revolt that broke out in Pomoravlje and Povardarje against the Byzantines in 1072–73.

== Uprising against the Byzantines (1072–73) ==
The themata of the Byzantine Empire, at the death of emperor Basil II in 1025.

The polities of Dioclea, Zachlumia, Travunia, Serbia and Bosnia in the late 11th century.

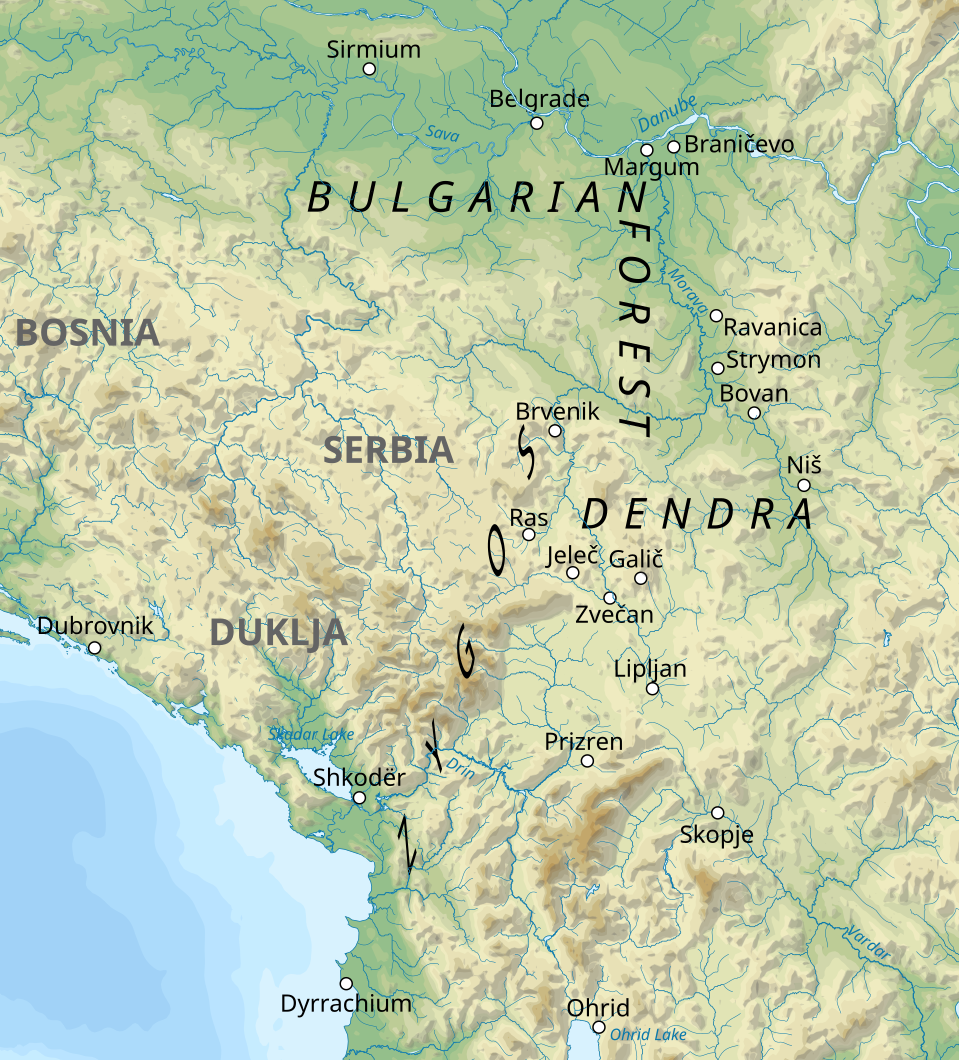
Byzantium's frontier in the 10-12th century (per Stephenson 2004, 2008).

Mihailo was approached by Bulgarian nobles (proechontes) led by Georgi Voyteh, who asked for a son whom they could crown as their emperor and end Byzantine "oppression". In the fall of 1072, Mihailo obliged and sent Bodin with 300 troops to Prizren, where they met with Georgi Voiteh, the exarch of Skopje, and other magnates. They proclaimed him emperor of the Bulgarians and renamed him Petar. It is theorized that Bodin was the great-grandson of Samuel of Bulgaria. Bodin was thus put at the command of the Bulgarian Slavs against the Byzantines (Greeks). The revolt, fought by the "Slavic people" (according to Bryennios) broke out in the theme of Bulgaria. It is possible that it was aided by the Hungarians. The aid to Georgi Voiteh moved Mihailo away from the Byzantines.

In the meantime, the Byzantine doux of Skopje, Nikephoros Karantenos, marched towards Prizren with an army but was replaced prior to the battle with Damian Dalassenos, who destroyed the morale of the army that would fight the Serbian contingent. The Serb army in Kosovo was split into two groups that would organize the uprising: the first was led by Bodin and operated in Pomoravlje, heading for Niš, while his second-in-command Vojvoda Petrilo operated in Povardarje, heading for Kastoria via Ohrid. Petrilo headed south and took Ohrid without a battle, and then Devol, but suffered a defeat at Kastoria, where Byzantine Slavic Boris David commanded a Bulgarian contingent and defeated Petrilo, sending him fleeing "through inaccessible mountains". The troops of Bodin took Niš and started plundering the region, abusing his 'subjects', which was seen by Voiteh as Bodin being greedier than Michael VII, and when the Byzantines under Saronites marched onto Skopje, Bodin showed no concern, making Voiteh surrender without resistance. A Byzantine garrison was installed at Skopje, and Saronites headed for Niš. In order to prevent the retreat to Zeta being cut off, Bodin also retreated from Niš but clashed with the Byzantines in Kosovo, where he was defeated and captured. Despite some initial success Bodin was captured at Pauni in southern Kosovo and then sent to Constantinople, then Antioch, where he spent several years. Voiteh died en route. When Mihailo heard of the capture of his son, he sent his son-in-law and former captive, the Byzantine general Longibardopoulos, to rescue Bodin, but instead, Longibardopoulos upon arriving defected to the Byzantines. When unrest began in Antioch, Mihailo paid some Venetian merchants who freed Bodin and took him home. Upon his return, it seems, Bodin became a co-ruler of his father.

== Co-rule ==
Soon after his return, the Byzantines attacked, forcing Mihailo and Bodin to temporarily acknowledge Byzantine overlordship. When, in 1081, the Normans crossed from Italy and attacked the Byzantines and besieged Dyrrhachion, Emperor Alexios I Komnenos went against them and called Bodin for aid. Bodin arrived with a Serb detachment; however, during the Battle of Dyrrhachion (18 October), he stayed aside with his army, intending to await the outcome of the battle. When the Byzantines were defeated and started to flee, Bodin retreated with his army.

== Reign ==
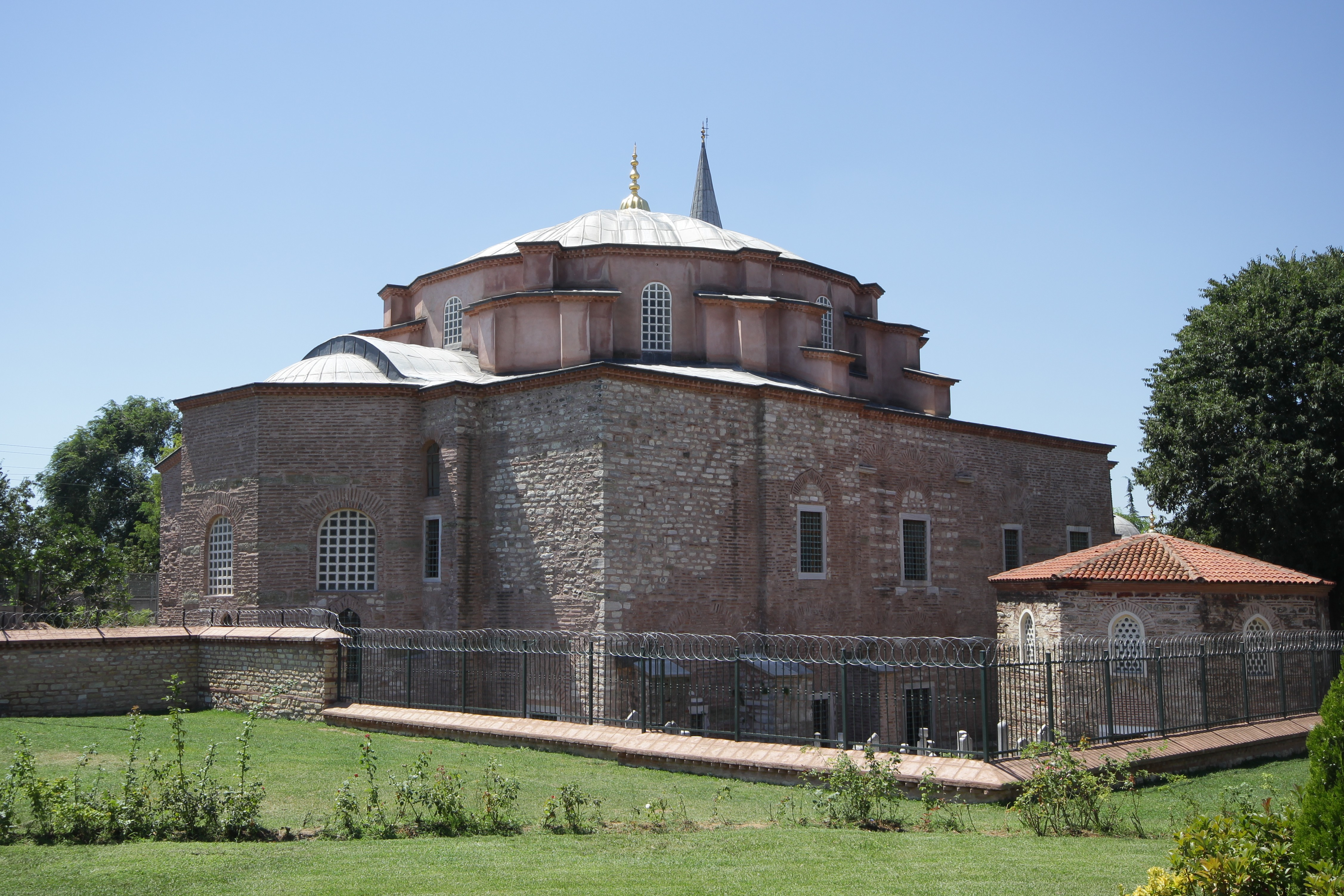
Bodin was imprisoned by the Byzantines at the Church of Sergius and Bacchus in Constantinople

After the death of King Mihailo, Bodin inherited the Dukljan throne. By this time Bodin was a mature man with a turbulent background and great experiences, also having been a co-ruler of his father for several years.

By 1085, he and his brothers had suppressed a revolt by their cousins, the sons of Mihailo's brother Radoslav in the župa of Zeta, and Bodin then ruled unchallenged. In spite of his earlier opposition to the Byzantine Empire, Bodin at first supported the Byzantines against the attack of Robert Guiscard and his Normans on Durazzo in 1081, but then stood idle, allowing the Normans to take the city. At about this time, Bodin married Jaquinta, the daughter of Argyritzos, a nobleman from Bari forced into exile in Duklja. Constantine Bodin's relations with the west included his support for Pope Urban II in 1089, which secured him a major concession, the upgrading of his bishop of Bar to the rank of an archbishop. Despite Bodin's submission to Rome, the Catholic Church only gained ground in coastal areas of his realm, while the inland parts remained under Constantinople.

According to the Chronicle of the Priest of Duklja (14th century), Constantine Bodin attempted to maintain the enlarged realm left him by his father. To do so, he campaigned in Bosnia and Serbia, installing his relative Stephen as knez in Bosnia and his nephews Vukan and Marko as župans in Serbia. Bodin's actions on different fronts outraged the Byzantines. They, after dealing with the Normans, attacked Bodin, defeated him and once again had him imprisoned. He quickly had himself freed, but after this, his reputation began to fall and influence to wane.

Exactly what happened in Duklja is unknown, and there may have been a civil war during Bodin's possible captivity. Queen Jaquinta ruthlessly persecuted possible claimants to the throne, including Bodin's cousin Branislav and his family. After a number of these persons were killed or exiled by Bodin and his wife, the church managed to keep the impending blood feud from sparking off a full-blown civil war. The focus of the Serbian national and state life were then transmitted in the 1090s to the mountains of Kopaonik, where his subject, župan (count) Vukan, played the most important role in the fight of the Serbs against the Byzantine Empire. Bodin was pushed to the background, contributed by the dynastic conflicts and his struggle against Dubrovnik, which brought him only little fame and success. Thus, Bodin, who had started his career with much enthusiasm and energy, ended his life and reign without power and reputation.

In the winter of 1097 the Crusaders under Raymond of Toulouse met Bodin at Scutari, and the Crusaders "affirmed brotherhood and bestowed many gifts upon the king of the Slavs", but they "sorely regretted our trust in the sham peace when the Slavs took advantage of the occasion, went berserk as was their custom, slew our people, and snatched what they could from the unarmed".

On Constantine Bodin's death in 1101 or possibly 1108, Duklja was engulfed in the conflict caused by the dynastic strife that had begun to develop during his reign.

== Titles ==
- His seal, during his vassalage under Alexios I Komnenos (r. 1081–1118), dating to the early years of his rule, has the face of St. Theodore, and the Greek writing saying: [Κ(ύρι)ε βοήθ]ει Κωνσ[ταντ]ίνῳ [(πρωτο)]σεβαστῷ καὶ ἐξουσιαστ(ῇ) Διοκλίας (καὶ) Σερβ[ίας] — "Lord, help Constantine, protosebastos and exousiastes of Dioclea and Serbia".
- Anna Komnene (1083–1153) calls him "Exarch of Dalmatia".
- The seal of Constantine's son, Đorđe, reads in Latin: "Geor(gius) regis Bodini filius", with the reverse depicting the image and Greek name of St. George, ὀ ἅγιος Γεώργι(ο)ς).

== Family ==
Constantine Bodin married Jaquinta, the daughter of the Norman governor of Bari. They had several children, among whom were sons:

- Mihailo II, titular king of Duklja ca. 1101–1102
- Đorđe, titular king of Duklja ca. 1118 and 1125–1127
- Argaric

== Annotations ==
1. His given name was Bodin (Βοδίνῳ, Skylitzes; Βοδίνου, Anna Komnene). According to Svetislav Mandić, John Skylitzes (fl. 1101) believed that he had a double name, Constantine Bodin, implying that he used Constantine prior to becoming Emperor Peter; if he was given only one name at baptism, according to tradition, he would only have the personal name Bodin prior to the revolt. After becoming Emperor, he was given the titular name Peter, which he had only during the revolt, as after its suppression there was no reason to continue calling him as such. After succeeding his father on the throne, he was given the honorific name Constantine.
2. Vasil Zlatarski claims per the Chronicle of the Priest of Duklja, published by Ferdo Šišić (1928): Genuit autem Dragamirus de prima uxore filium Voislavum qui] accepit uxorem puellam virginem speciosam, nepotem Samuelis imperatoris. — Mihailo Vojislavljević's mother (Neda) was a granddaughter of Samuel of Bulgaria as daughter of Jovan Vladimir and Theodora Kosara — a daughter of Samuel.

== Sources ==
Primary sources

- Шишић, Фердо, ed. (1928). Летопис Попа Дукљанина (Chronicle of the Priest of Duklja). Београд-Загреб: Српска краљевска академија.
- Кунчер, Драгана (2009). Gesta Regum Sclavorum. Vol. 1. Београд-Никшић: Историјски институт, Манастир Острог.
- Живковић, Тибор (2009). Gesta Regum Sclavorum. Vol. 2. Београд-Никшић: Историјски институт, Манастир Острог.

Secondary sources

- Ćorović, Vladimir (2001). Istorija srpskog naroda (in Serbian) (Internet ed.). Belgrade: Ars Libri.
- Ćirković, Sima (2004). The Serbs. Malden: Blackwell Publishing. ISBN 9781405142915.
- Fine, John V. A. Jr. (1991) [1983]. The Early Medieval Balkans: A Critical Survey from the Sixth to the Late Twelfth Century. Ann Arbor: University of Michigan Press. ISBN 0-472-08149-7.
- Ivanišević, Vujadin; Krsmanović, Bojana (2013). "Byzantine Seals from the Ras Fortress" (PDF). Зборник радова Византолошког института. 50 (1): 449–460.
- Komatina, Ivana (2015). "Srpski vladari u Aleksijadi - hronološki okviri delovanja" [Serbian rulers in the Alexiad - some chronological notes] (PDF). ZRVI. LII.
- Madgearu, Alexandru (2013). Byzantine Military Organization on the Danube, 10th–12th Centuries. Brill. ISBN 978-90-04-21243-5.
- Samardžić, Radovan; Duškov, Milan, eds. (1993). Serbs in European Civilization. Belgrade: Nova, Serbian Academy of Sciences and Arts, Institute for Balkan Studies. ISBN 9788675830153.
- Stanojević, Stanoje (1989) [1927]. Сви српски владари: биографије српских (са црногорским и босанским) и преглед хрватских владара. Opovo: Simbol. ISBN 86-81299-04-2.
- Stephenson, Paul (2000). Byzantium's Balkan Frontier: A Political Study of the Northern Balkans, 900-1204. Cambridge University Press. ISBN 978-0-521-77017-0.
- Veselinović, Andrija; Ljušić, Radoš (2008). Srpske dinastije. Službeni glasnik. ISBN 978-86-7549-921-3.
- Živković, Tibor (2006). Portreti srpskih vladara (IX—XII vek). Belgrade. pp. 11–20. ISBN 86-17-13754-1.
- Živković, Tibor (2008). Forging unity: The South Slavs between East and West 550-1150. Belgrade: The Institute of History, Čigoja štampa. ISBN 9788675585732.
- Živković, Tibor (2005). "Dva pitanja iz vremena vladavine kralja Bodina". Recueil des travaux de l'Institut d'études byzantines. 42. Vizantološki institut.
- Živković, Vojislav (2025). "About the First Contacts of Serbs and Normans: Archiriz of Bari, Father-in-law of King Constantine Bodin". Vizantijsko-slovenska čtenija. 8: 151–164.

Constantine Bodin Vojislavljević dynasty Died: 1108
Regnal titles
Preceded by Michael I	King of Dioclea; 1081–1101	Succeeded by Michael II
Vacant Byzantine rule Title last held by Peter II	— TITULAR — Tsar of Bulgaria; 1072	Vacant Byzantine rule Title next held by Peter IV
