= Nikephoros Karantenos =

Doux of Skopje

Nikephoros Karantenos, Latinized as Nicephorus Carantenus (Greek: Νικηφόρος ὁ Καραντηνός), (fl. 1067–1072) was a Byzantine general known for fighting against the Bulgarians in the Balkans and the Normans in Italy. The main sources for his life is the continuator (Skylitzes Continuatus) of John Skylitzes, Lupus Protospatharius, and the Anonymi Barensis Chronicon.

Karantenos was rewarded for his service against the Bulgars with the post of military governor (doux) of Skopje. Then, in 1067, when Constantine X desired to retake the lost cities of Apulia, he sent Karantenos with Mabrikias to Bari. Taranto, Castellaneta, and Brindisi were reconquered from the Normans and a garrison of Varangians was established at the latter under Karantenos. He was given the title of strategos of Brindisi.

When the Normans put Brindisi under siege in 1070, Karantenos feigned surrender and then attacked the Normans as they were scaling the walls on ladders. He beheaded a hundred corpses and crossed the sea to Dyrrachium with the heads, thence shipping them off to Constantinople to impress the emperor.

In 1072, he was back in Bulgaria to pacify the revolt of Constantine Bodin.

== Sources ==
- Gay, Jules. L'Italie méridionale et l'empire Byzantin: Livre II. Burt Franklin: New York, 1904.
