= Goffredo Malaterra =

11th-century monk and historian

Gaufredo (or Geoffrey, or Goffredo) Malaterra (Latin: Gaufridus Malaterra) was an eleventh-century Benedictine monk and historian, possibly of Norman origin. He travelled to the southern Italian peninsula, passing some time in Apulia before entering the monastery of Sant'Agata at Catania, on the isle of Sicily. Malaterra indicates that, prior to his arrival in Catania, he had spent an undefined period away from monastic life, in the worldly service of "Martha".

== Background ==
Little is known of Geoffrey before he became a monk in Sicily. He writes in the dedication of his history that he previously served the clergy in some secular capacity, and that he came from "a region on the other side of the mountains," which is generally seen as a reference to the Alps. While many historians have cited this as evidence for Geoffrey's Norman heritage and historians Ernesto Pontieri and Marjorie Chibnall have gone so far as to place him in the monastery of St. Evroul before his arrival in Italy. Kenneth Baxter Wolf argues that this is misguided and that Geoffrey could have come from many places in Europe. It is likely that he came to Sicily as part of Duke Roger's ecclesiastical rebuilding, and was placed at the monastery of St. Agatha, where he served under Abbot Angerius.

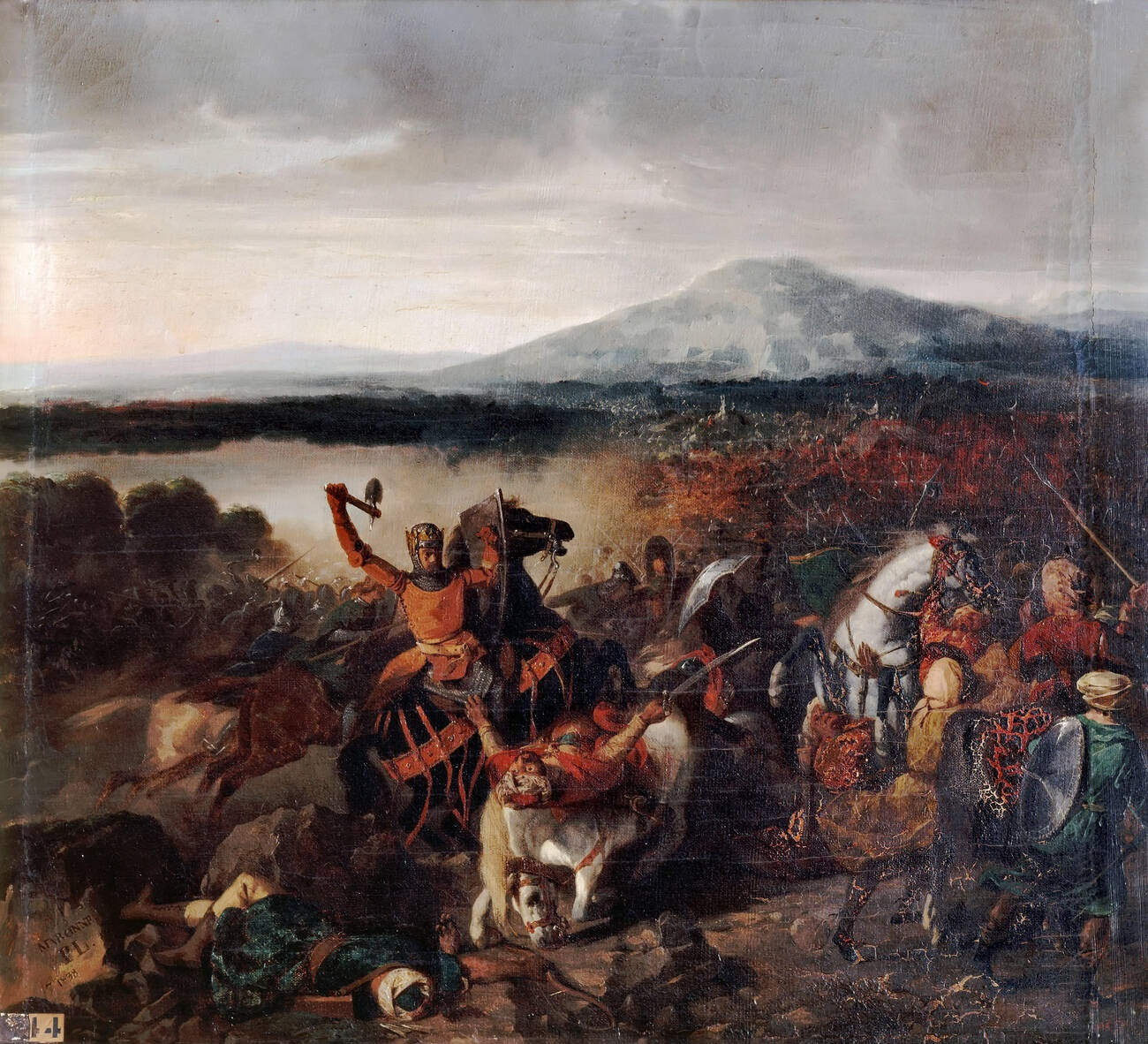
Duke Roger at the Battle of Cerami (1063). Geoffrey came to Sicily following its conquest by Roger and his older brother, Robert Guiscard.

== De rebus gestis Rogerii et Roberti ==
Malaterra wrote Latin history, the De Rebus Gestis Rogerii Calabriae et Siciliae Comitis et Roberti Guiscardi Ducis fratris eius, which chronicles the history of the Normans in Italy, particularly the brothers Robert Guiscard and Roger I of Sicily, and their conquest of Sicily. Geoffrey reports Pope Urban II's bull of 5 July 1098, which made Roger and his heirs legates of the Latin church, but not much after that. Additionally, he notes Bohemond's joining the First Crusade, but not the Fall of Jerusalem or Bohemond's conquest of Antioch. These details indicate that he probably finished his history around this time in 1098. Malaterra's work is one of the three surviving contemporaneous histories of the Norman conquest of Italy, the others being those of William of Apulia and Amatus of Montecassino. Malaterra's is significant because it is the only history significantly to cover the conquest of Sicily. It seems likely that Geoffrey was writing at the behest of Roger, who was an old man by this time and may have been looking to legitimize the claims of his heirs. Unlike other medieval historians, such as Dudo of Saint-Quentin, Malaterra does not directly identify his sources, and alludes briefly to a number of informants, or relatoribus. These may have included Roger I of Sicily, himself.

The work ends in 1099 and provides many valuable details, especially of the conquest of Sicily, which are unattested elsewhere. It is unclear precisely when Malaterra started and finished work on the text. All of the events therein are recorded in the past tense and the author does not indicate any knowledge of the death of Roger I of Sicily in 1101. At present, the consensus is that it was started after the majority of the events related in the text had come to pass, and finished before Roger I of Sicily's death. A passing reference to the work in Orderic Vitalis's Historia Ecclesiastica confirms that the work had been completed and was in circulation, albeit across a small geographical area, by the 1130s.

== Sources ==
- Geoffrey Malaterra. The Deeds of Count Roger of Calabria and Sicily and of Duke Robert Guiscard, his brother, trans. Graham Loud (unpub). Books 1–4.
- Gaufredo Malaterra, De Rebus Gestis Rogerii Calabriae et Siciliae Comitis et Roberti Guiscardi Ducis fratris eius, ed. Ernesto Pontieri, Rerum Italicarum Scriptores V pt.1 (Bologna, 1927–8).
- Geoffroi Malaterra), Histoire du Grand Comte Roger et de son frère Robert Guiscard, édité par Marie-Agnès Lucas-Avenel, Caen, Presses universitaires de Caen, 2016 (coll. Fontes et paginae). ISBN 9782841337439. Texte latin et traduction française consultable en ligne: https://www.unicaen.fr/puc/sources/malaterra/
- Storia de’ Normanni di Amato di Montecassino, ed. V de Bartholomeis, Fonti per la storia d’Italia 76 (Rome, 1935).
- Guillermus Apuliensis, Gesta Roberti Wiscardi, ed. M Mathieu (Palermo, 1961).
- Orderic Vitalis, The Ecclesiastical History, ed. and trans. by Marjorie Chibnall, vol. 2 (Oxford, 1969).
- E. Johnson, 'Normandy and Norman Identity in Southern Italian Chronicles', Anglo Norman Studies, 27 (2005), pp. 85–100.
- Kenneth Baxter Wolf, Making History: the Normans and their historians in eleventh-century Italy (Philadelphia, 1995).
- Graham Loud, 'The Gens Normannorum: Myth or Reality?', Proceedings of the Fourth Battle Conference on Anglo-Norman Studies 1981, ed. R Allen Brown (Woodbridge, 1982), pp. 104–119, 205–209, (repr. in Graham Loud, Conquerors and Churchmen in Norman Italy (Great Yarmouth, 1999) pp. 104–116, 205–209).
