= King of the Wends =

Title previously used by Swedish and Danish monarchs

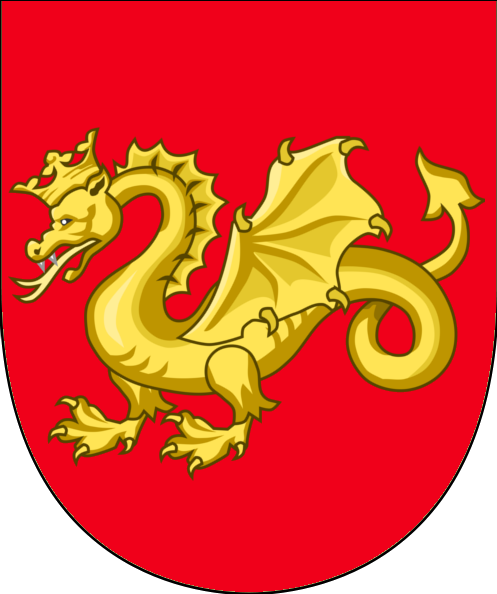
Coat of arms of the King of the Wends. It has also later been interpreted as a symbol for Funen.

King of the Wends, from Scandia, was a pan-Scandinavian title denoting sovereignty, lordship or claims over the Wends. (Note: A people who historically populated Western Slavic lands of southern coasts of the Baltic Sea, those otherwise called Mecklenburg, Holstein and Pomerania.) It was used from the 12th century to 1972 by the kings of Denmark and from c. 1540 to 1973 by the kings of Sweden.

== Etymology ==
The generally accepted interpretation is that King of the Wends (Latin: Rex Vandalorum/Rex Sclavorum; Danish: Vendernes Konge; Swedish: Vendes Konung) refers to the Wends, West Slavic peoples that lived on the south shores of the Baltic Sea. The situation is further complicated by the existence of the Vends, located between the Finns and the Wends and with somewhat unknown origin. One poetic explanation of the title was kingship over the Vandals (vandalorum rex), but that idea came only in the 16th century. A recent interpretation, not much supported in academic research, has been made that the part "Vend" in the later established titles of the kings of Sweden (three kingdoms: King of the Svear, Götar and Vends; Swedish: Svears, Göters och Venders konung) means Finland, the form presumably being akin to winds, "vind". As such, the Österland—the medieval name for the Finnish part of the Swedish kingdom—was the third part of the realm. However, only forty years after the adoption of the title "king of the Wends", the Swedish kings began to style themselves as grand dukes of Finland as well.

In Germanic languages, the name was Wends, and in medieval documentation the Latin name was sclavorum rex, referring to the Slavic peoples in and around the region now known as Mecklenburg. In the 16th century, Latin sclavorum was changed to vandalorum also by Danish kings, showing the new poetic idea.

In Denmark, Konge til Danmark, de Venders og Goters ('King of Denmark, of the Wends and of the Goths') was part of the monarch's official style until the accession in 1972 of Queen Margrethe II.

In Sweden, Sveriges, Götes och Vendes konung ('King of Sweden, the Goths and the Wends') was used in official documentation up to the accession in 1973, of Carl XVI Gustaf.

== History ==
Monarchs of Denmark bore the title for eight centuries, after it was first adopted by King Canute VI (reigned 1182 to 1202), who conquered the lands of the Wends in Pomerania and Mecklenburg. The Danish kings continued to use the title over the next seven hundred years until 1972, when Queen Margrethe II succeeded. She abandoned the use of all the royal titles except for that of Danmarks konge/dronning ('King/Queen of Denmark'), which is the royal style today.

The first Swedish king to use the title was Karl Knutsson. He had attempted to be elected King of the Kalmar Union, which united Sweden, Norway, and Denmark. Although unsuccessful, he continued to use the Danish royal titles until his death. When Sweden had made its final breakaway from the Kalmar Union, tensions between the rulers of Denmark and Sweden were high, and it showed also in their flags, coats of arms, and titles. Gustav I of Sweden adopted c. 1540 the third "kingdom" to his titles, which had only included Sweden and the Goths (Vandalorumque rex, Venders konung). Sveriges, Götes och Vendes konung ('King of Sweden, the Goths and the Wends') was used in official documentation up to the accession in 1973, of Carl XVI Gustaf, who was the first monarch to be proclaimed Sveriges konung ('King of Sweden') and nothing else.

== See also ==
- King of the Goths
- King of the Slavs
