= Uprising of Georgi Voyteh =

Failed Bulgarian rebellion against the Byzantines

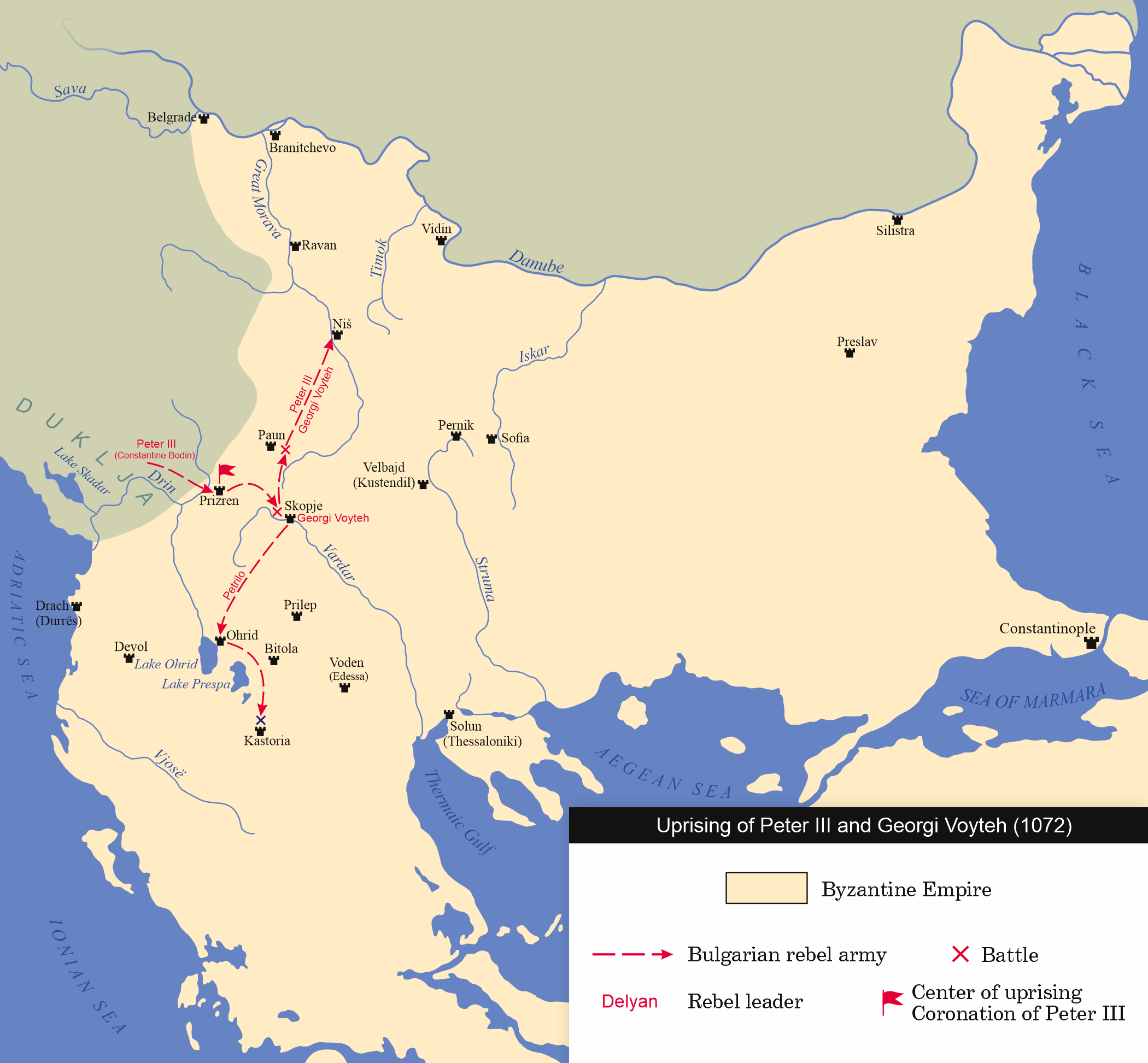
Uprising of Peter III and Georgi Voyteh (1072)

The Uprising of Georgi Voyteh (Bulgarian: Въстание на Георги Войтех, romanized: Vastanie na Georgi Voyteh), or the Slavic uprising against the Byzantine rule (Serbian: Словенски устанак против византијске власти, romanized: Slovenski ustanak protiv vizantijske vlasti) was a wide South Slavic uprising against the Byzantine rule, that broke out in central Balkan regions soon after the devastating Byzantine defeat in Asia Minor, at the Battle of Manzikert (1071). The movement was initiated by Bulgarian leaders in the theme of Bulgaria, with assistance from the Serbian prince Michael I of Duklja, whose son Bodin was accepted by the rebels and proclaimed as emperor of Bulgaria, under the name Peter (1072). After some initial expansion, and several clashes with the Byzantines, the rebels were defeated by 1073. That was the second major attempt to restore the Bulgarian Empire, after the failed Uprising of Peter Delyan in 1040–1041.

== History ==
The main prerequisites for the uprising were the weakness of Byzantium after the invasions of the Pechenegs in the lower Danube, the Byzantine–Hungarian War in the same area, the great defeat at the hands of the Seljuk Turks in the Battle of Manzikert (1071) and the invasion of the Normans from southern Italy as well as the rising taxes during the reign of Michael VII. The uprising was prepared by the Bulgarian nobility in Skopje led by Georgi Voyteh. They chose the son of Serbian Prince of Duklja Michael, Constantine Bodin as their leader, as he was a descendant of the Bulgarian Emperor Samuil. In the autumn of 1072 Constantine Bodin arrived at Prizren where he was proclaimed Emperor of the Bulgarians under the name Peter III. The Serbian Prince sent 300 soldiers led by Vojvoda Petrilo.

An army under Damianos Dalassenos was immediately sent from Constantinople to help the strategos of the Theme of Bulgaria, Nikephoros Karantenos. In the battle that followed the Byzantine army was completely defeated. Dalassenos and other Byzantine commanders were captured and Skopie was taken by the Bulgarians troops.

After that success the rebels tried to expand the area under their control. Constantine Bodin headed north and reached Naissus (modern Niš). Because some Bulgarian towns with Byzantine garrisons did not surrender, they were burned down. Petrilo marched southwards and captured Ochrid (modern Ohrid) and Devol. However, near the town of Kastoria his large army was defeated by the Byzantines and some Bulgarian commanders who did not want to acknowledge Peter III as their ruler.

Another army was sent from Constantinople under Michael Saronites. Saronites seized Skoupoi and in December 1072 he defeated the army of Constantine Bodin at a place known as Taonios (in the southern parts of Kosovo Polje). Constantine Bodin and Georgi Voyteh were captured. The army which Prince Michael sent to relieve his son did not achieve anything because its commander, a Norman mercenary defected to the Byzantines. The rebellion was finally crushed in 1073 by doux Nikephoros Bryennios.

== Sources ==
- Ćirković, Sima (2004). The Serbs. Malden: Blackwell Publishing.
- Curta, Florin (2006). Southeastern Europe in the Middle Ages, 500–1250. Cambridge: Cambridge University Press.
- Fine, John Van Antwerp Jr. (1991) [1983]. The Early Medieval Balkans: A Critical Survey from the Sixth to the Late Twelfth Century. Ann Arbor: University of Michigan Press.
- Hupchick, Dennis P. The Bulgarian-Byzantine Wars for Early Medieval Balkan Hegemony: Silver-Lined Skulls and Blinded Armies, Springer, 2017, ISBN 3319562061.
- Литаврин, Г. Болгария и Византия в XI-XII вв., Издательство Академии наук СССР, Москва 1960
- Павлов, Пл. Бунтари и авантюристи в Средновековна България, Издателство „Абагар“, Велико Търново 2000, ISBN 954-427-423-5 (глава Георги Войтех от "рода на кавканите" в електронното издание LiterNet, 2005)
- Stephenson, Paul (2000). Byzantium's Balkan Frontier: A Political Study of the Northern Balkans, 900-1204. Cambridge University Press. ISBN 978-0-521-77017-0.
- Živković, Tibor (2008). Forging unity: The South Slavs between East and West 550-1150. Belgrade: The Institute of History; Čigoja štampa.
- Златарски, В. История на българската държава през средните векове, том II: България под византийско владичество, Издателство „Наука и изкуство“, София 1972 (цитирано по електронното издание в Книги за Македония, 10.8.2008)
