= Amatus of Montecassino =

Benedictine monk and chronicler

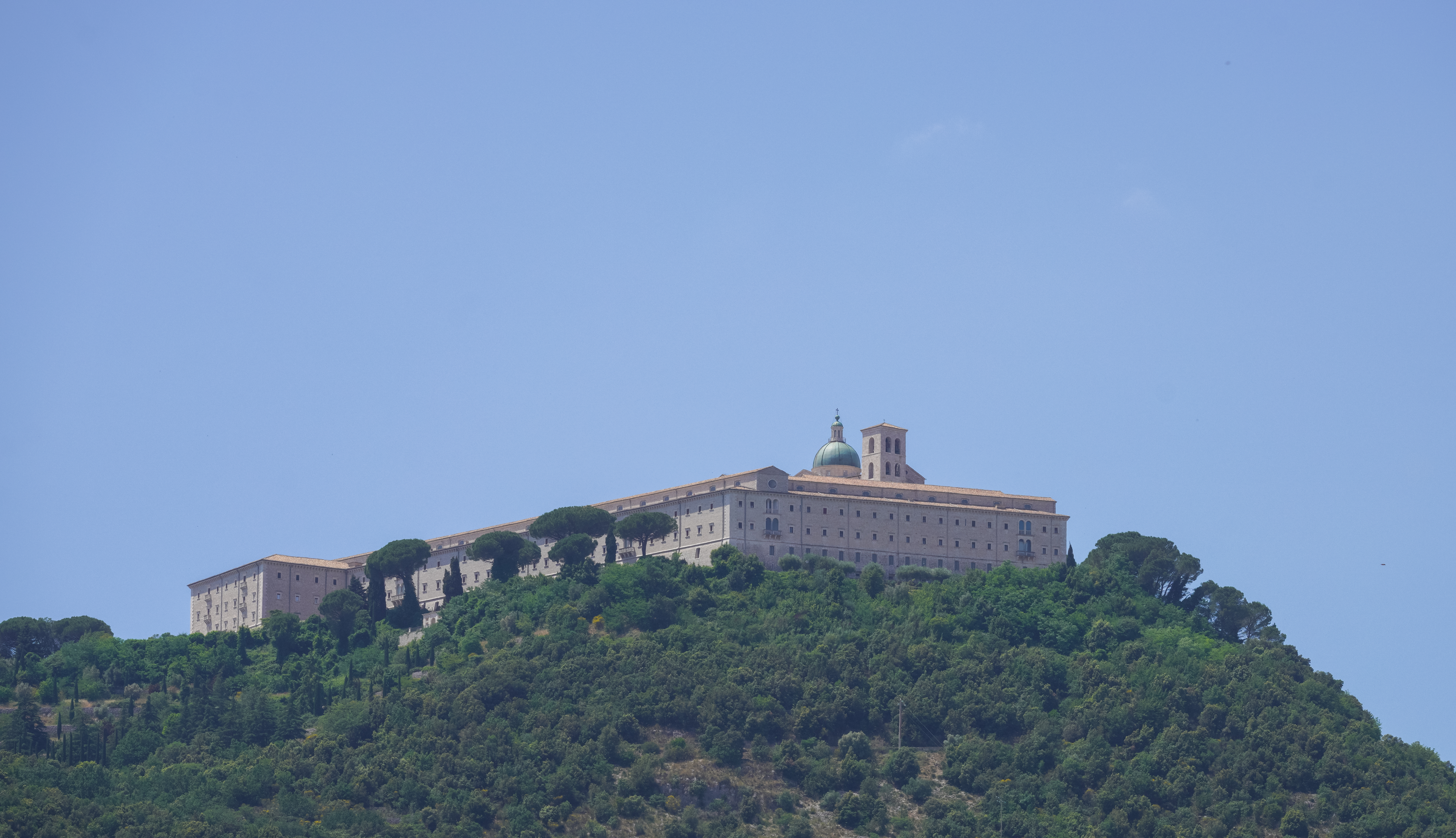
The Abbey of Montecassino, where Amatus composed his history.

Amatus of Montecassino (Latin: Amatus Casinensis), (11th century) was a Benedictine monk of the Abbey of Montecassino who is best known for his historical chronicles of his era. His History of the Normans (which has survived only in its medieval French translation, L'Ystoire de li Normant), is one of three principle primary sources for the Norman Conquest of southern Italy--the other two being the histories of William of Apulia and Geoffrey Malaterra. Amatus describes the Normans from the perspective of his abbey, one of the most important religious and cultural centers in Italy at the time. His history is the earliest extant account of the Norman sieges of Bari and Salerno, their conquest of Sicily, and the careers of both Robert Guiscard and Richard Drengot, as well as the Gregorian Reforms seen from the papal point of view.

== Background ==
Nothing is known for certain about Amatus before he became a monk. Possibly having been born in Salerno, Graham Loud suggests that he might have served as the Bishop of Paestum in the 1050s, prior to his admission into the monastery. He wrote primarily while Desiderius (later Pope Victor III) ruled as abbot. Previous to the ascension of Desiderius, the relationship between Montecassino and the Normans in the area had been an antagonistic one. Desiderius' election as abbot, however, coincided with Richard Drengot's annexation of Capua, after which Dregnot became the protector and patron of the abbey, which heavily affected Amatus' writings. His extremely negative treatment of Gisulf II of Salerno throughout his history may indicate some previous hostilities between the two, and Gisulf is known to have been limiting church privilege around Salerno in the 1050s.

== The History of the Normans ==
Amatus' L'Ystoire de li Normant chronicles the history of the Normans in Southern Italy, from their arrival to the death of Richard Drengot of Capua. Kenneth Baxter Wolf hypothesizes that, because the stated purpose of the history is to commemorate the deeds of Richard of Capua and Robert Guiscard, that Amatus (or Abbot Desiderius) was prompted to write because of Richard's death in 1078. Amatus' chronicle was written soon after 1080, making it the first of the Norman histories of Southern Italy to be written Originally written in Latin, the text now only survives in a fourteenth-century French translation commissioned by a "conte da Militrée," who was possibly connected to the Angevin dynasty of the Kingdom of Naples. However, the work was not only translated, but also summarized and abridged at points. Despite this, Wolf argues that comparisons with the second version of the Chronica monasterii Casinensis, written by Leo Marsicanus and incorporating parts of Amatus's original text, suggest that the corrupted French translation is not completely inaccurate.

== In popular culture ==
The historical novel by Gabriella Brooke, The Words of Bernfrieda: A Chronicle of Hauteville (Cheney: Eastern Washington University Press, 1999) tells of the Lady Fredesenda of Hauteville, mother of Robert Guiscard, as seen by her handmaid, who has met Amatus and intends to record "all that Amatus' chronicle will leave out".
