= San Giovanni dei Lebbrosi, Palermo =

Ancient church in Palermo, Sicily, Italy

Church of Saint John of the Lepers
- Chiesa di San Giovanni dei Lebbrosi (in Italian)
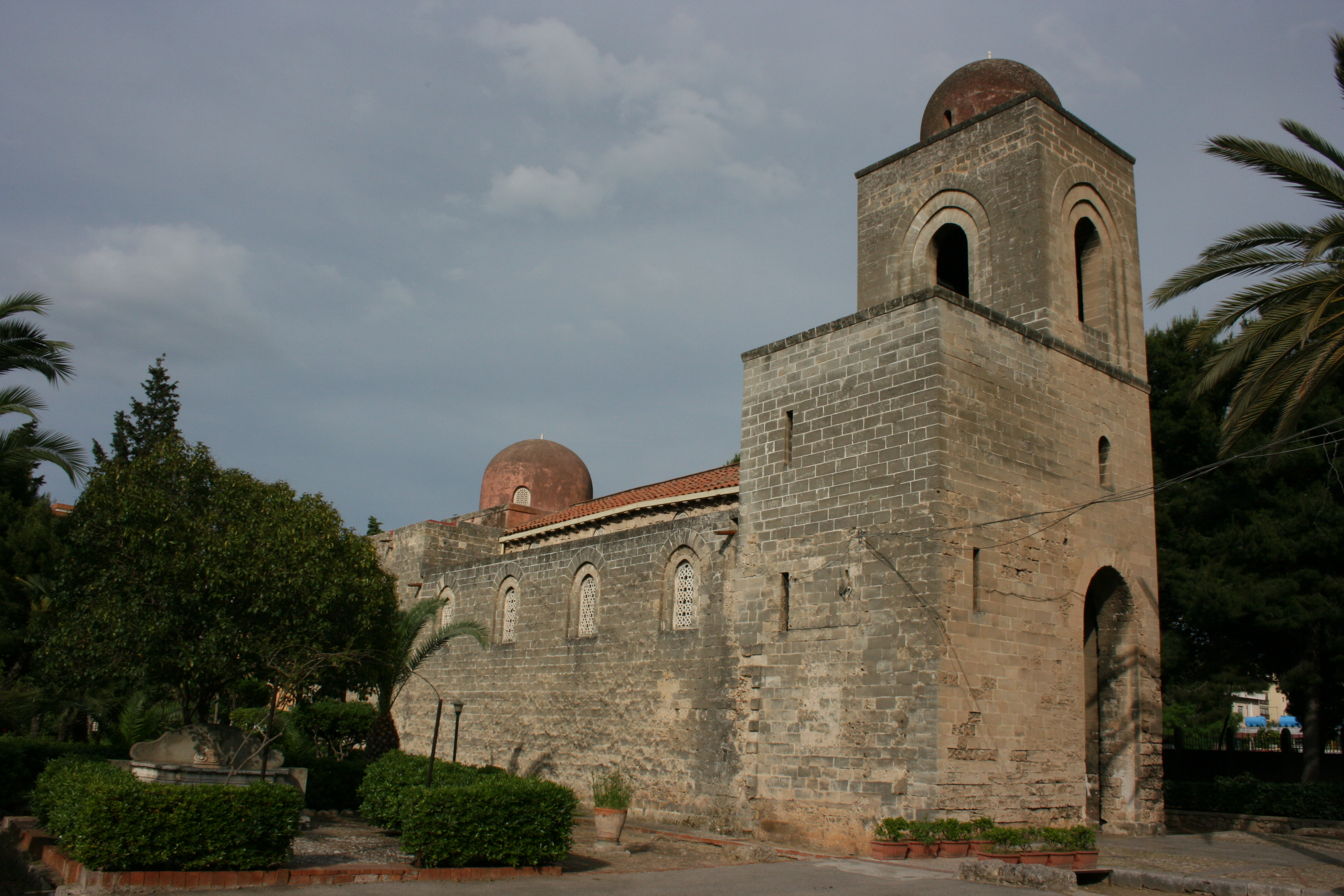
- Exterior of the Church

Religion
- Affiliation: Roman Catholic
- Province: Archdiocese of Palermo
- Rite: Roman Rite

Location
- Location: Palermo, Italy
- Interactive map of Church of Saint John of the Lepers
- Coordinates: 38°06′13″N 13°22′49″E

Architecture
- Style: Arab-Norman
- Completed: 1071

San Giovanni dei Lebbrosi is an ancient church in Palermo, Sicily. While built by the Norman rulers, the architecture has strong Arabic influences. The church in 1119 was attached to a leprosarium, hence the title. The church was dedicated to St John the Baptist. The adjacent hospital no longer exists.

The church was initially commissioned in 1071 by Robert Guiscard and Roger I of Sicily. Tradition holds the besieging Norman Army had camped near this site, near an Arabic castle, and here erected a temporary shrine, which later became the site of the church. The leprosarium was putatively built because Roger II's brother died of Leprosy. Over the years, the hospital and church was under the control of various religious orders, including the Teutonic knights.

The church, which had become a house, underwent dramatic restoration from 1920 to 1934. Centuries of accretions were removed. Some of the internal columns have capitals decorated with Kufic script.

== See also ==
- High medieval domes
