= Georgi Voyteh =

Bulgarian aristocrat and rebel leader

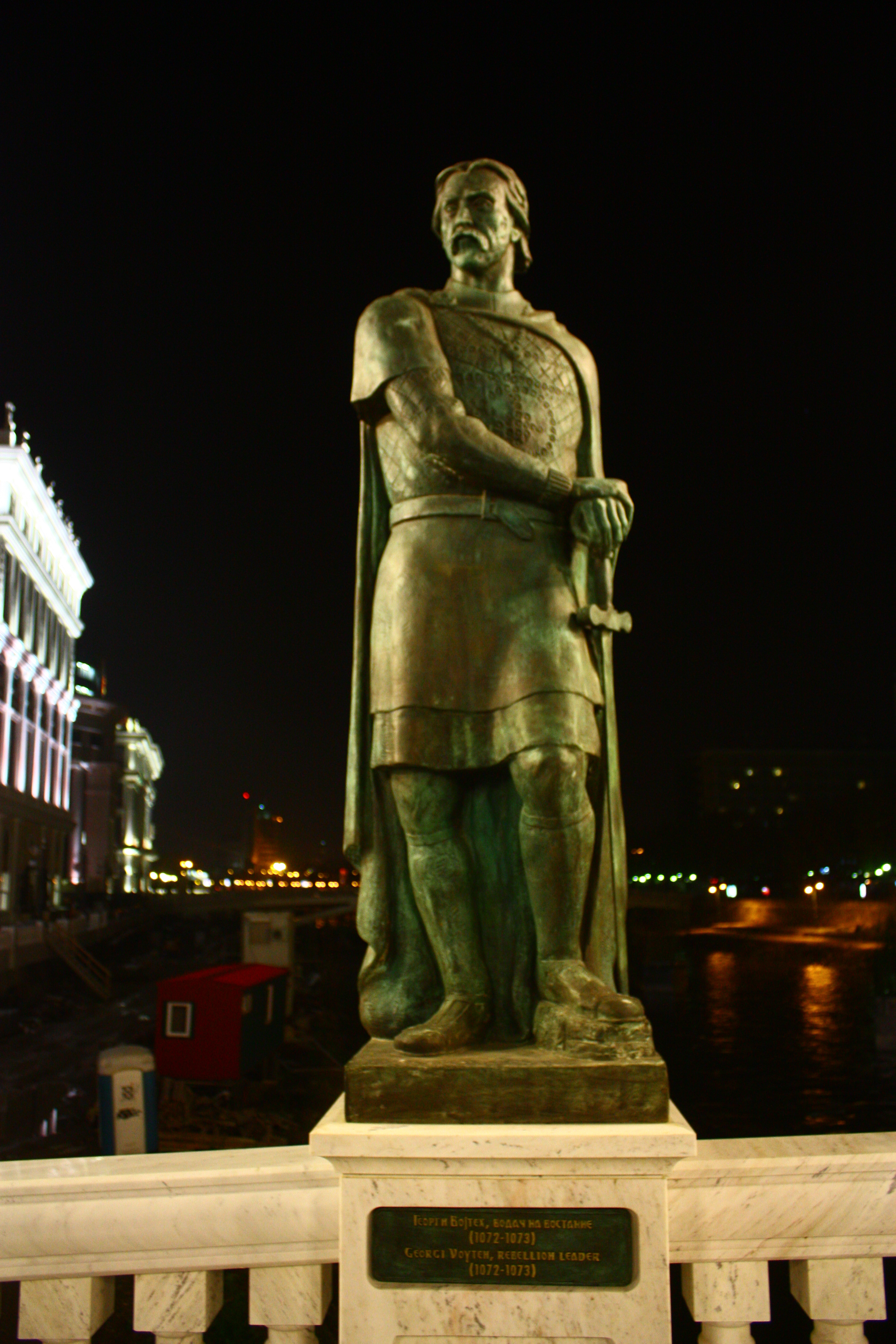
- Bronze statue of Georgi Voyteh in Skopje
- Died: 1072
- Known for: Uprising of Georgi Voyteh

Georgi Voyteh (Bulgarian: Георги Войтех, Greek: Γεώργιος Βοιτέχ) was an 11th-century Bulgarian aristocrat from Skopje who started a major uprising in Byzantine Bulgaria against the Byzantine rule.

== History ==
In 1071, Georgi Voyteh led the Bulgarian people, discontent with the Byzantine rule, in an uprising. According to the Bulgarian tradition, only a descendant of the royal family could be crowned for Tsar. As Voyteh, albeit coming from a Kavkhan family, was not from the royal family, the conspirators turned to the Prince of Zeta Michael and asked him to send his son Constantine Bodin to receive the crown. Bodin was descended from the Cometopuli on his mother's side.

In 1072, in Prizren Bodin was crowned "Tsar of Bulgaria" under the name Peter III. The rebels took Skoupoi (modern Skopje), the capital of the Theme of Bulgaria, where Georgi Voyteh remained as a commander while Bodin marched to Naissus. The Emperor managed to seize the town, but, in the meantime, Skopje was besieged by a large Byzantine army. Voyteh, who thought that he was unprepared to face a long siege or that he wouldn't receive help from Bodin, opened negotiations with the Byzantine general Michael Saronites and finally surrendered. He repented later of this act of cowardice and sent a secret message to Constantine Bodin suggesting that he should strike at Skoupoi while the Byzantines were unprepared for it. The Bulgarian Emperor headed to Skoupoi (Skopje), but was ambushed and defeated marking the end of the uprising.

Georgi Voyteh died during his transportation to Constantinople in the same year.

== Legacy ==
Voyteh Point on Livingston Island in the South Shetland Islands, Antarctica is named after Georgi Voyteh.

== Sources ==
- „История на българската държава през средните векове. Том II. България под византийско владичество (1018—1187)“ - Vasil Zlatarski (I изд. София 1934; II фототипно изд., Наука и изкуство, София 1972, под ред. на Димитър Ангелов)
