= Siege of Bari =

1068–71 battle of the Byzantine-Norman Wars

- Part of the Byzantine–Norman wars and the Norman conquest of southern Italy
Date	5 August 1068 – 15 April 1071
Location	Bari, Apulia
Result	Norman victory
Territorial changes	End of Byzantine Italy

Belligerents
Byzantine Empire	Normans

Commanders and leaders
Michael Maurex; Avartuteles; Stephen Pateran	Robert Guiscard

Strength
Bari garrison, other Byzantine reinforcements and 20 ships	Norman army and fleet, unknown size

Casualties and losses
Heavy, including civilians	Heavy

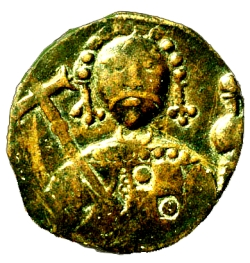
Robert Guiscard, duke of Sicily

The siege of Bari took place 1068–1071, during the Middle Ages, when Norman forces, under the command of Robert Guiscard, laid siege to the city of Bari, a major stronghold of the Byzantines in Italy and the capital of the Catepanate of Italy, starting from 5 August 1068. Bari was captured on 16 April 1071 when Robert Guiscard entered the city, ending not only more than five centuries of Byzantine presence in Southern Italy but also ancient Roman control since the Roman expansion in Italy in the 3rd century BCE.

== History ==
=== Background ===
By 1060, only a few coastal cities in Apulia were still in Byzantine hands: during the previous few decades, the Normans had increased their possessions in southern Italy and now aimed to the complete expulsion of the Byzantines from the peninsula before concentrating on the conquest of Sicily, then mostly under Islamic domination. Large military units were thus called from Sicily and under Count Geoffrey of Conversano laid siege to Otranto.

=== The siege ===
The next move was the arrival of Robert Guiscard, with a large corps, who laid siege to the Byzantine city of Bari on 5 August 1068. Within the city there were two parties: one wanting to preserve allegiance to the Byzantine empire, and another that was pro-Norman. When the Norman troops neared, the former had prevailed and the local barons shut the city's gates and sent an embassy led by Bisantius Guirdeliku to emperor Romanos IV Diogenes in order to seek military help. The negotiations offered by Robert were refused.

Otranto fell in October, but at Bari the Norman attacks against the walls were repeatedly pushed back by the Byzantines. Robert decided to blockade the city's port with a fortified bridge in order to thwart any relief effort; however, the Byzantines destroyed the bridge, and managed to maintain a link with their homeland.

Romanos IV named a new catepan, Avartuteles, and provided him with a fleet with men and supplies for Bari. The Byzantine fleet arrived at the city in early 1069, but in the meantime a Byzantine field army was defeated by the Normans, who occupied Gravina and Obbiano. Robert did not return immediately to Bari, and in the January 1070 he moved to Brindisi to help the Norman forces then besieging that coastal fortress. Brindisi capitulated in the autumn of 1070.

The situation in Bari was then critical, and the population suffered from famine. Avartuteles plotted to have Robert assassinated, but the Byzantine patricius Byzantios Guideliku failed. A delegation of citizens asked the catepan to improve the city's defence, or otherwise surrender it to the Normans. Avartuteles played for time, sending another embassy to Constantinople. He obtained the arrival of a fleet with grain in Bari. When the grain ran out, a group of citizens again asked the catepan to beg the emperor to send an army as soon as possible.

Romanos IV, whose generals had been repeatedly defeated by the Normans, and with few free troops to dispatch, sent twenty ships under the command of a Gocelin, a Norman rebel who had taken shelter in Constantinople. Stephen Pateran, appointed as new catepan of Italy, came with him; however, the Normans intercepted the Byzantine ships off Bari and scattered them. The Norman sailors identified Gocelin's ship and, despite the loss of 150 men, finally captured it; Stephen Pateran was instead able to reach Bari. He soon recognized that the defence had become impossible; a local noble, Argyritzos, was sent to negotiate with the Normans. The latter offered acceptable conditions, and Bari surrendered on April 1071.

=== Aftermath ===
Stephen Pateran was initially imprisoned, but was later allowed to return to Constantinople with other Byzantine survivors. With the fall of Bari, the Byzantine presence in southern Italy ended after 536 years. Emperor Manuel I Komnenos tried to reconquer southern Italy in 1156-1158, but the attempt turned into a failure. According to William of Apulia, Robert Guiscard "entrusted the city" to Argyritzos; however, the earliest document of Norman rule shows a certain Lizius, probably a Norman, as viscount and a patrikios named Maurelianus, probably a native Bariot, as catepan.

== Sources ==
- William of Apulia (1096–99). "The Deeds of Robert Guiscard" (DOC). University of Leeds.
- Alexander Vasiliev. "The time of troubles (1056–1081)". A History of the Byzantine Empire. Ellopus.
