= Neda (princess) =

Princess/Queen regnant of Duklja
- Reign: 1043–1046
- Predecessor: Stefan Vojislav
- Successor: Mihailo
- Junior co-rulers: Gojislav; Mihailo; Saganek; Radoslav; Predimir

Princess/Queen consort of Duklja
- Tenure: ?–1043
- Died: 1046; Duklja
- Spouse: Stefan Vojislav
- Issue: Gojislav; Mihailo; Saganek; Radoslav; Predimir
- House: Vojislavljević (by marriage); Cometopuli (by birth)
- Religion: Eastern Orthodox Christian

Neda (Serbian Cyrillic: Неда) was the Kneginja ("princess" or "queen") of Duklja, wife of the Great Župan Stefan Vojislav.

She was the niece of the Bulgarian Tsar Samuel. She was the second wife of Stefan Vojislav, with whom she had five sons: Gojislav, Mihailo, Saganek, Radoslav, and Predimir. After his death in 1043, she ruled the kingdom for some time, together with her sons.

According to Chapter XXXIX of the Chronicle of the Priest of Duklja, after the death of King Vojislav, his wife and sons co-ruled the kingdom. The same source calls her with the title of queen and reports that none of her sons was called king while their mother was alive and they were only called princes.

The period of joint rule by her sons lasted from 1043 to 1046. Neda died in 1046.

According to Chapter XL of the Chronicle of the Priest of Duklja, the source says about Neda that the queen died and Mihailo accepted the kingdom.
