= Bulgaria (theme) =

Province of the Byzantine Empire (1018–1185)

The themata of the Byzantine Empire, at the death of Basil II in 1025.

The Theme of Bulgaria (Greek: Θέμα Βουλγαρίας, romanized: Thema Boulgarias) was a theme (province) of the Byzantine Empire established by Emperor Basil II after the conquest of Bulgaria in 1018. Its capital was Skopje and it was governed by a strategos. The theme of Bulgaria did not encompass the old Bulgarian lands between the Haimos Mountains and the river Danube, that included the former capitals Pliska and Preslav. This territory was administered independently and was considered as autonomous military unit, designated as Paristrion or Paradunavon, meaning the "lands beside the Danube".

The local inhabitants were called Bulgarians, but some authors maintain this name did not have an ethnic meaning. Bulgaroi was a political name, in the same way as Romaioi. The emotive force which the name has today is quite distinct from that which inspired the emperors John I and Basil II to celebrate their victories with elaborate ceremony. It can be seen from the fact that the rebels in the Uprising of 1072 invited a Serbian king from Diokleia Constantine Bodin, which belonged to the former empires of Simeon I of Bulgaria and Samuel of Bulgaria, to be the Tsar of the Bulgarians. However, some authors suggest that Bodin was invited, because he was the great-great-grandson of Samuel of Bulgaria.

Other researcher maintain that the development of Old Church Slavonic literacy during the 10th century prevented the assimilation of the Eastern South Slavs into the Byzantine culture, which promoted then the formation of a distinct Bulgarian identity which was strong enough to preserve the concept of Bulgaria and the Bulgarians as a distinct entities. An example is the last ruler of the First Bulgarian Empire Ivan Vladislav, who in the Bitola inscription dated 1015–16 called himself "autocrat of the Bulgarian tsardom" and "native-born Bulgarian", which is an evidence of the Bulgarian identity by then political and cultural elite. Thus, the Bulgarians kept their identity, which reached particular strength after the Second Bulgarian Empire was formed in the 12th century. The period ended with the Uprising of Asen and Peter.

The conquest of the First Bulgarian Empire by Byzantium lasted half a century. For this reason, Basil II the Bulgar Slayer after the conquest did not decide on any changes in order to bloodlessly establish the new status quo. The Bulgarian lands that offered the fiercest resistance were separated into the theme of Bulgaria. Initially the Byzantine emperor Basil II issued an order that the tax system of the subdued Bulgarian kingdom continue to be applied in the annexed Bulgarian lands. The Bulgarian patriarchate was downgraded to an archbishopric called Archbishopric of Ohrid, that retained an autocephalous status. The Bulgarian aristocracy also retained its position. Troops were recruited mainly from the Bulgarian population. However, only ten years later after the death of Basil II, the Byzantine tax system was introduced. Slavic literacy, liturgy and traditions of the Archbishopric were in some places subjected to persecution. Some of the Bulgarian aristocracy had slowly but consistently been removed from its position. Many were sent on assignments in other realms of the Empire remote from the Balkans. This situation gave rise to discontent among the local population.

Rebellions aimed at restoration of the Bulgarian state broke out. The first rebellion rose in Belgrade in 1040. It was headed by Peter Delyan, grandson of Tsar Samuel. This was followed by several more uprisings: Uprising in Thessaly (1066) led by Nikoulitzas Delphinas; Uprising of George Voytech; Uprising in Paristrion, and the revolts of Dobromir in Mesembria and Leka in Serdika in 1079. After the coming to power of the Komnenian Dynasty, the Bulgarian uprisings subsided, due to the integration of the old Bulgarian aristocracy in the rule of the empire, as seen in the writings of Anna Komnene about her grandmother Maria of Bulgaria in "Alexiad".

At the end of the 11th century the Byzantine domains in the Balkans became an arena of fierce hostilities. The Normans invaded from the south and the knights of the First (1096–97) and then the Second Crusade (1146–47) advanced from west. Most frightful were the renewed raids of the Turkic barbarians from the steppes, the Uzes, Pechenegs and the Cumans. At the end of the 12th century, formally Byzantium was the sovereign, but in many Balkan areas the Byzantine power was nominal. In 1185, the Normans landed in Dyrrachium again, moved east and looted Thessalonica. The chaos in the imperial domains encouraged the Bulgarians to restore their state with the rebellion of the brothers Peter and Asen, and Bulgaria sought again to dominate the Balkans. The disintegration of Byzantium was complete when in 1204 the Fourth Crusade captured Constantinople. The Latins established their own Latin Empire in the place of the Byzantine Empire and set up their own feudal states in the southern Balkans.

== Notes ==
=== Sources ===
- B. Panov, Mitko (2019). The Blinded State: Historiographic Debates about Samuel Cometopoulos and His State (10th-11th Century); Volume 55 of East Central and Eastern Europe in the Middle Ages, 450-1450. Leiden/Boston: BRILL. ISBN 978-9004394292.
- Stephenson, Paul (2000). Byzantium's Balkan Frontier: A Political Study of the Northern Balkans, 900-1204. Cambridge: Cambridge University Press. ISBN 9780511496615.
- Madgearu, Alexandru (2006). "Centrifugal movements in the Balkans in the 11th century". Études byzantines et post-byzantines. 5: 213–221.
