= Mihailo I of Duklja =

Serbian king

Mihailo Vojislavljević Prince of Triballians and Serbs
- King of the Slavs; King of the Serbs
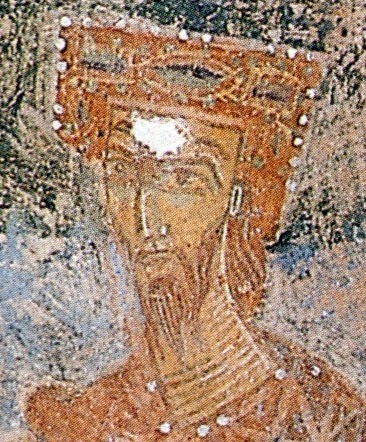
- Mihailo I on a fresco in the Church of St. Michael in Ston.

King of Dioclea Prince of Triballians and Serbs Τριβαλλών και Σέρβων αρχηγός
- Reign: 1046–1081
- Predecessor: Neda
- Successor: Constantine Bodin
- Died: 1081
- Spouse: Monomachina
- Issue: Vladimir; Constantine Bodin; Dobroslav II; Petrislav
- House: Vojislavljević
- Father: Vojislav
- Mother: Neda
- Religion: Catholic

Mihailo Vojislavljević (Serbian Cyrillic: Михаило Војислављевић) was a medieval Serbian king and the ruler of Dioclea (Duklja), from 1046 to 1081, initially as a Byzantine vassal holding the title of protospatharios, then after 1077 as nominally serving Pope Gregory VII, styled as "King of the Slavs". He had alienated himself from the Byzantines when he supported the Bulgarian Uprising of Georgi Voyteh, after which he then sought to gain support in the West. In 1077 he received royal insignia by Gregory VII in the aftermath of the Church schism of 1054.

== Life ==
=== Early rule ===
With the death of Stefan Vojislav, his dominion was divided among his five sons (according to the Chronicle of the Priest of Duklja). Gojislav received Travunia (Trebinje) ruled briefly until he was killed by local nobles, who set up Domanek in his place. Mihailo expelled him and Saganek chosen to rule, but Domanek returned and drove him out. Mihailo offered the office to Radoslav, who declined, afraid of losing Luška župa (future Zeta). Radoslav perhaps distrusted his brother, thinking he would seize Zeta, but Mihailo seems to have offered him a deal.

The Byzantine Empire, keen to take advantage of the death of Stefan Vojislav, prepared an offensive against unstable Duklja. At this time, the four remaining brothers made peace and signed an alliance, deemed the oldest treaty in Serbian history. After the agreement, Radoslav attacked Travunia, killing Domanek. After this event, their mother (who had acted as an stability in the relations between the brothers) died. Mihailo succeeded as Knez of "Duklja" in 1046, or as his realm was called by contemporary Cedrenus: "Triballorum ac Serborum principatum".

While in no imminent danger from that side, Mihailo found it favorable to further strengthen ties with Byzantium and, in 1050, he received the title of protospatharios and married a niece of Constantine IX Monomachos, something that might have implied a titular recognition of Constantinople's authority, but without no real concessions on his part. It corresponded to the then-current balance of forces and bought some 20 years of peace and prosperity to his land.

=== Aid to anti-Byzantine uprising in theme of Bulgaria ===
Matters started to change after 1071, the year of Byzantium's key Asian debacle at the Battle of Manzikert, as well as of the Norman conquest of southern Italy.

In 1072, the Bulgarian noblemen in Skopje planned a revolt against Byzantine rule under the leadership of Georgi Voiteh, the exarchos of the city. The rebel chieftains (proechontes) asked Mihailo I for help and, in exchange, offered to one of his sons, a descendant of the House of the Cometopuli, the Bulgarian throne. In the fall of 1072, Michael I gladly sent Constantine Bodin with 300 troops, which arrived at Prizren and met with Voiteh and other magnates. There they crowned Bodin "Emperor of the Bulgarians" and gave him the name 'Peter III', recalling the names of the Emperor-Saint Peter I (d. 970) and of Peter II Delyan (who had led the first major revolt against Byzantine rule in 1040–1041). Despite some initial successes, Bodin was subsequently captured. When Michael I heard about his son's capture, he sent a captive Byzantine general, Langobardopoulos, whom he had married with one of his daughters, to rescue him, but he defected to the Byzantines.

The aid to Georgi Voiteh moved Mihailo away from the Byzantines.

=== Papal vassalage; crown receival, and Byzantine enemy ===
After the uprising, Mihailo began looking for support westward - to the Pope. This came as a result not only of his alienation from the Byzantines, but also from a desire to create an independent archbishopric within his realm and to finally to obtain a royal title. In the aftermath of the Church schism of 1054, Pope Gregory VII was interested in bestowing royal crown on rulers in the rift area and Mihailo was granted his in 1077. Thereafter, Duklja was referred to as a kingdom, a situation that lasted until its reduction in the following century.

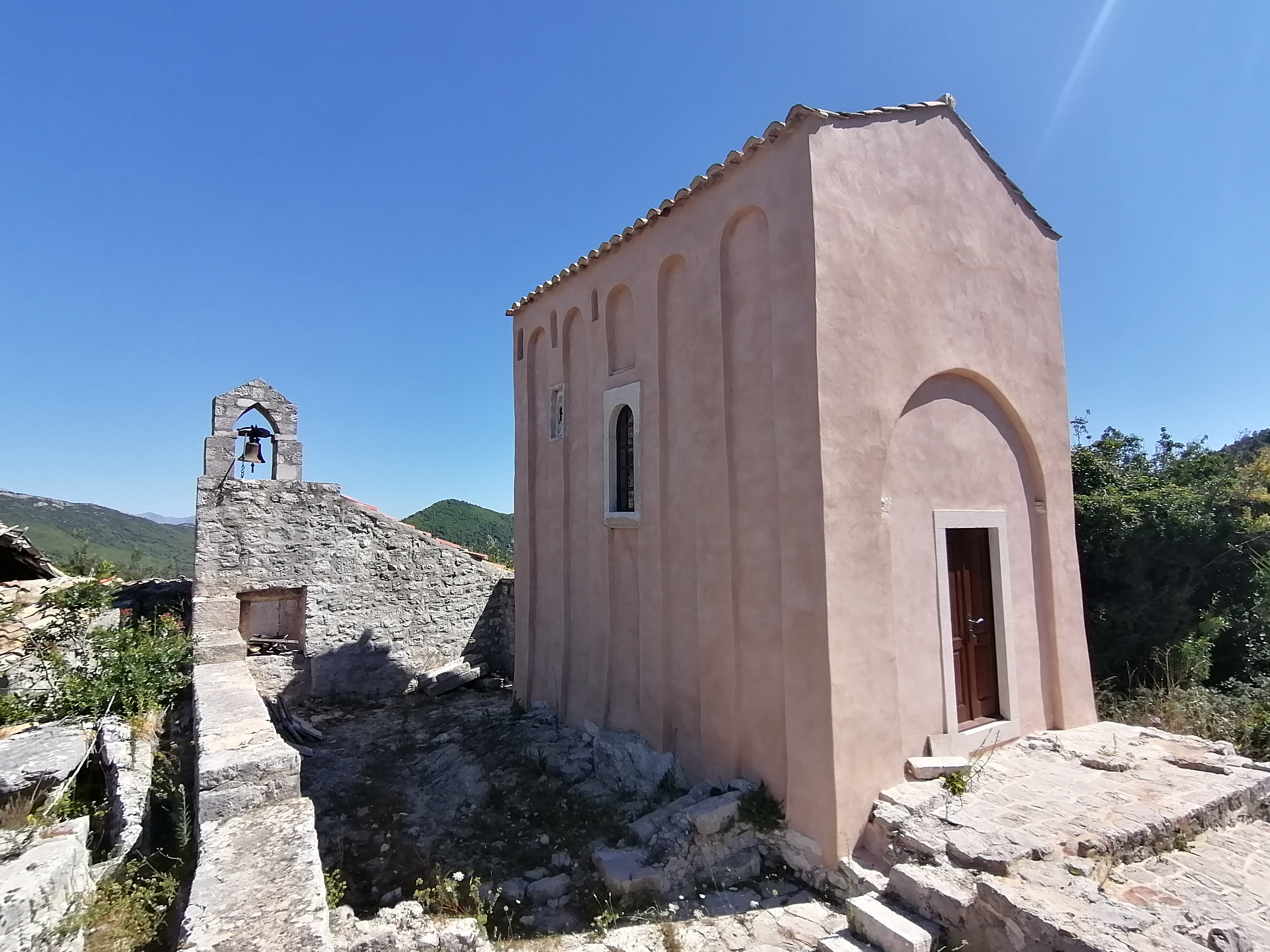
Church of St. Michael near Ston

It is not known whether his brothers accepted him as supreme ruler or if he forced it upon them. Onwards, Mihailo was the ruler of All Duklja, and his brothers may at most have had only appanages.

=== Last years ===
Having sealed ties with the Normans through marriage of his heir, Constantine Bodin, with Jaquinta of Bari, Mihailo died in 1081, after a rule of 30 or so years. He left St. Michael's Church in Ston, north of Dubrovnik, a small church following mostly an early Byzantine style, which contains one of the oldest known fresco portraits of a South Slavic ruler.

== Titles ==
- According to George Kedrenos (fl. 1050s) and John Skylitzes (fl. 1057), he was the Prince of Triballians and Serbs (Τριβαλλών και Σέρβων...αρχηγός/ Τριβαλλῶν καὶ Σέρβων...ἀρχηγός), and was called an "ally and friend of the Byzantines", having received the title of protospatharios.
- In 1077, he received a crown from Pope Gregory VII, who thereafter addressed Mihailo as "King of the Slavs". A letter dated January 9, 1078, begins "Gregory ... to Michael, king of the Slavs" (Latin: Sclavorum regi).
- Anna Komnene (1083–1153) calls him "Exarch of Dalmatia [i.e. Serbia]".

== Family ==
Mihailo married a niece of Constantine IX Monomachos, with whom he had seven sons, out of which four are known:

- Vladimir
- Constantin Bodin
- Dobroslav II
- Petrislav, ruled Rascia (anachronism for the Principality of Serbia)
- A daughter

== Sources ==
Primary sources

- Кунчер, Драгана (2009). Gesta Regum Sclavorum. Vol. 1. Београд-Никшић: Историјски институт, Манастир Острог.
- Живковић, Тибор (2009). Gesta Regum Sclavorum. Vol. 2. Београд-Никшић: Историјски институт, Манастир Острог.
- Шишић, Фердо, ed. (1928). Летопис Попа Дукљанина (Chronicle of the Priest of Duklja). Београд-Загреб: Српска краљевска академија.
- Thurn, Hans, ed. (1973). Ioannis Scylitzae Synopsis historiarum. Berlin-New York: De Gruyter. ISBN 9783110022858.

Secondary sources

- Ćirković, Sima (2004). The Serbs. Malden: Blackwell Publishing. ISBN 9781405142915.
- Curta, Florin (2006). Southeastern Europe in the Middle Ages, 500–1250. Cambridge: Cambridge University Press. ISBN 9780521815390.
- Fine, John Van Antwerp Jr. (1991) [1983]. The Early Medieval Balkans: A Critical Survey from the Sixth to the Late Twelfth Century. Ann Arbor, Michigan: University of Michigan Press. ISBN 0472081497.
- Kalić, Jovanka (2017). "The First Coronation Churches of Medieval Serbia". Balcanica (48): 7–18. doi:10.2298/BALC1748007K. hdl:21.15107/rcub_dais_4886.
- Stephenson, Paul (2000). Byzantium's Balkan Frontier: A Political Study of the Northern Balkans, 900–1204. Cambridge: Cambridge University Press. ISBN 9780521770170.
- Stephenson, Paul (November 2006). "Partial Translation of Chronicle of the Priest of Duklja". .Mac. Archived from the original on 2011-05-14.
- Veselinović, Andrija; Ljušić, Radoš (2008). Srpske dinastije (in Serbian). Službeni glasnik. ISBN 978-86-7549-921-3.
- Živković, Vojislav (2025). "About the First Contacts of Serbs and Normans: Archiriz of Bari, Father-in-law of King Constantine Bodin". Vizantijsko-slovenska čtenija. 8: 151–164.
- Živković, Tibor (2008). Forging unity: The South Slavs between East and West 550-1150. Belgrade: The Institute of History, Čigoja štampa. ISBN 9788675585732.

Royal titles
Preceded by Neda	Prince of Triballians and Serbs / Exarch of Serbia (at Duklja); 1050 – 1081	Succeeded by Constantine Bodin
