= Kenneth Baxter Wolf =

American historian of medieval studies

Kenneth Baxter Wolf (born June 1, 1957) is an American historian and scholar of medieval studies.

== Biography ==
Wolf is the John Sutton Miner Professor of History and Professor of Classics at Pomona College in Claremont, California, where he has taught since 1985.

== Works ==
=== Authored ===
- Christian Martyrs in Muslim Spain (Cambridge University Press, 1988)
- The Normans and Their Historians in Eleventh-Century Italy (University of Pennsylvania Press, 1995)
- The Poverty of Riches. St. Francis of Assisi Reconsidered (Oxford University Press, 2003)

=== Translated ===
- Conquerors and Chroniclers of Early Medieval Spain (Liverpool University Press, 1990)
- The Deeds of Count Roger and of His Brother Duke Robert Guiscard (University of Michigan Press, 2005)
- The Life and Afterlife of St. Elizabeth of Hungary and Testimony from her Canonization Hearings (Oxford University Press, 2011)
