= Anonymi Barensis Chronicon =

Medieval Italian chronicle

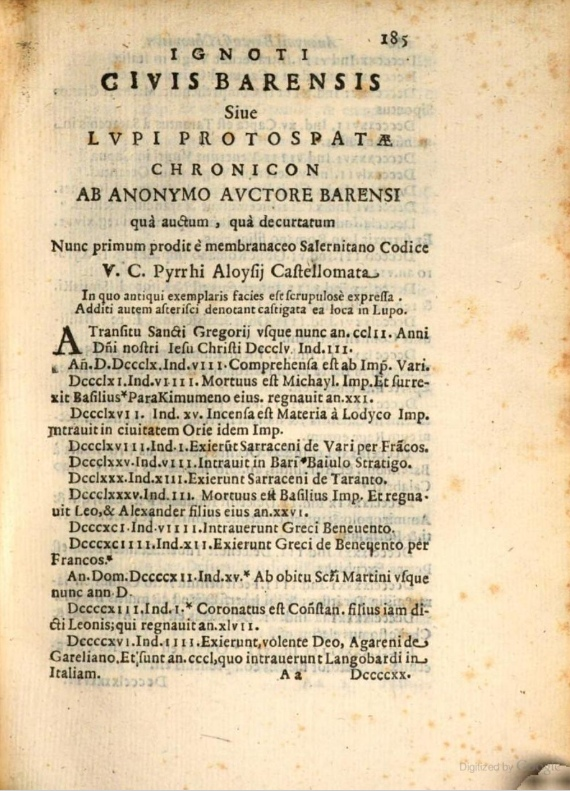
1643 editio princeps of the chronicle

Anonymi Barensis Chronicon is a medieval Italian annalistic chronicle.

Composed in Latin by an anonymous author from Bari in the first quarter of the 12th century, it covers the years 855–1118, concentrating first and foremost on the events in Bari and Apulia. The First Crusade is followed in some detail, however, as are the Byzantine affairs.

Anonymi Barensis Chronicon has much content in common with two other Bariot chronicles, Annales Barenses and, especially, Annales Lupi Protospatharii (with which it also shares the beginning). Therefore, all three are assumed to be based on some older chronicle that no longer survives. The Chronicon becomes more detailed from the 1040s on, also diverging in coverage from the other chronicles.

No medieval copy of Anonymi Barensis Chronicon is known. The survival of the chronicle is due to the 17th-century Italian historian Camillo Pellegrino^{(it)} who transcribed the text from a manuscript in Salerno and published it in Naples in 1643. In 1724, it was reprinted in volume 5 of Rerum Italicarum scriptores^{(it)}, influential corpus of historical sources first compiled by the Italian historian Ludovico Antonio Muratori. In 1753, Francesco Maria Pratilli published a number of fake chronicles, including a forgery based on the Chronicon.
