= Annales Barenses =

The Annales Barenses is an anonymous set of annals written in the city of Bari in the late eleventh century. At the time of its composition, Bari was the chief city of the Byzantine Empire in southern Italy.

The Annales Barenses are closely related to the chronicle of Lupus Protospatharius and the Anonymi Barensis Chronicon. The Annales Barenses cover the period from the death of Pope Gregory the Great in 605 until the election of Peter III, Archbishop of Acerenza, in 1102. They are at their most useful for the short period 1041–43.
