= Lupus Protospatharius =

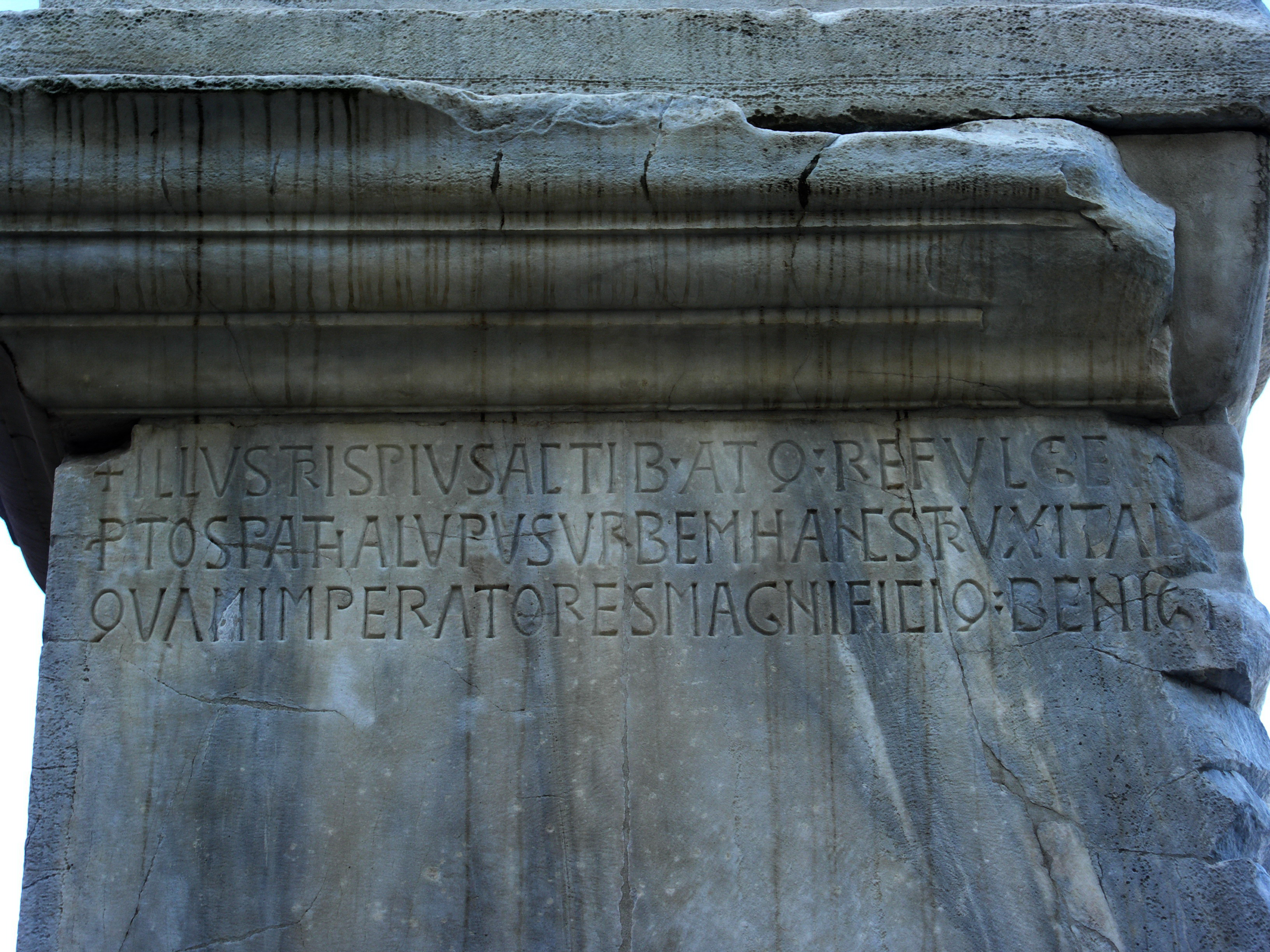
A Roman column in Brindisi bearing the incomplete inscription: ILLUSTRIS PIVS ACTIB(US) ATQ(UE) REFVLGENS P(RO)TOSPATHA(RIVS) LVPVS VRBEM HANC STRVXIT AB IMO QVAM IMPERATORES MAGNIFICIQ(UE) BENIGNI ... (Lupus Protospatharius, illustrious and pious in his actions of beneficence, reconstructed from the foundation this city, that the magnificent and benign emperors...) It is in reference to the rebuilding of Brindisi after Saracen attacks in the ninth century, and so any connection with the supposed author of the Annales barenses must be tenuous at best.

Lupus Protospatharius Barensis was the reputed author of the Chronicon rerum in regno Neapolitano gestarum (also called Annales Lupi Protospatharii), a concise history of the Mezzogiorno from 805 to 1102. He has only been named as the author since the seventeenth century. Lupus, along with two other Bariot chronicles, the Annales barenses and the Anonymi Barensis Chronicon, used some lost ancient annals of Bari up to 1051. William of Apulia appears to have used these same annals. Lupus also used the lost annals of Matera. Perhaps most unusual to Lupus is his dating method. He began his years in September and so places events of the latter half of a given year in the next year.
