= William of Apulia =

11th-century Italian historian

William of Apulia (Latin: Guillelmus Apuliensis) was a poet and chronicler of the Normans, writing in the 1090s. His Latin epic, Gesta Roberti Wiscardi ("The Deeds of Robert Guiscard"), written in hexameters, is one of the principal contemporary sources for the Norman conquest of southern Italy, especially the career of Robert Guiscard, Duke of Apulia (1059–1085).

== Background ==
Little is known about William's life before he wrote his history of the Normans. Unlike the other two principal chroniclers of the Normans in Italy, Amatus of Montecassino and Geoffrey Malaterra, William was probably a layman, based on the relative lack of religious references in his work. Wolf argues that William was a Lombard, rather than a Norman, as his treatment of Lombard characters in his history is very sympathetic when compared to his contemporary Norman counterparts. Brown suggests that William was born to "Greek-speaking, Lombard parents", or any other union combination in the melting pot of Apulia, because of his sympathetic writing of the Byzantines as well as the Lombards, also adding that it was not uncommon for Lombard parents to pass Norman names to their children after Norman arrival. The Greek connection is notable as he was very knowledgeable about and familiar with the Byzantine Court system, language, and history.

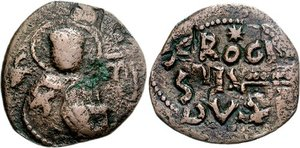
The coinage of Roger Borsa, to whom William dedicated his work and of whose court William was probably a member.

== The Gesta Roberti Wiscardi ==
William's poem Gesta Roberti Wiscardi was probably composed sometime between 1097 and 1099, (Note: Brown suggests it was completed in c.1090.) as he notes the fighting of the crusaders in Anatolia during 1097, but not the fall of Jerusalem in 1099. The poem was dedicated to Duke Roger Borsa son of duke Robert Guiscard, implying that he was a member of the former's court. More than the works of his two fellow chroniclers of the Normans, Amatus of Montecassino and Geoffrey Malaterra, William's work is a tribute to Robert Guiscard, which may indicate that Roger commissioned it to strengthen his claim to his father's titles. Brown argues that the poem is very generous towards the Byzantines and verges into being a piece of Byzantine history as much as it is a work commissioned by Normans.

== Editions ==
- William of Apulia (2008). The Deeds of Robert Guiscard. Translated by Loud, Graham A. OCLC 1184547282 – via White Rose Research Online. Translated from Guilelmus Apuliensis (1961). Mathieu, Marguerite (ed.). La geste de Robert Guiscard (in French). Palermo: Istituto siciliano di studi bizantini e neoellenic. OCLC 583382918 – via Internet Archive.
