= Bosnia (early medieval) =

Early Middle Ages state in Southeast Europe (600s–1154)

Bosnia Bosna Босна
- 8/9th century–1154
- Capital: possibly Katera or Desnik
- Demonym: Bosnians
  - Type: Principality
- History
  - Established: 8/9th century
  - Ban Borić appointed as Bosnian ban: 1154
Preceded by	Succeeded by
Byzantine Empire	Banate of Bosnia
- Today part of: Bosnia and Herzegovina

Bosnia (Greek: Βοσωνα, romanized: Bosona, Serbo-Croatian: Босна, Bosna) in the Early Middle Ages to early High Middle Ages was a territorially and politically defined South Slavic entity. It was situated, broadly, around the upper and middle course of the Bosna river, between the valleys of the Drina river on the east and the Vrbas river on the west, which comprise a wider area of central and eastern modern-day Bosnia and Herzegovina.

== Geography ==
Territorial development of Bosnia during the Middle Ages; earliest medieval period colored darkest, as the original Bosnia

The very nucleus where the first Bosnian state emerged and had developed is Visoko valley, surrounding a wider area of modern-day town of Visoko. This area will be known as župa Bosna, as nucleus of the zemlja Bosna. The early Bosnia, according to Vego and Mrgić, as well as Hadžijahić and Anđelić, was situated, broadly, around the Bosna river, between its upper and the middle course: in the south to north direction between the line formed by its source and the Prača river in the south, and the line formed by the Drinjača river and the Krivaja river (from Olovo, downstream to town of Maglaj), and Vlašić mountain in the north, and in the west to east direction between the Rama-Vrbas line stretching from the Neretva to Pliva in the west, and the Drina in the east, which is a wider area of central and eastern modern-day Bosnia and Herzegovina.

Confirmation of its emergence and territorial distribution comes from historiographical interpretation of late 13-14th century Chronicle of the Priest of Duklja in modern and post-modern scholarship, which situate the state around the Upper Bosna river and the Upper Vrbas river, including Uskoplje, Pliva and Luka. This also suggest that this distribution from the Bosna river valley into the Vrbas river valley is the earliest recorded. These three small parishes will later become a quintessence for emergence of Donji Kraji county, before they were reclaimed as Kotromanić's demesne, after 1416 and death of Hrvoje Vukčić Hrvatinić.

== History ==
=== 7-9th century: Early formation of the land ===
The western Balkans had been reconquered from "barbarians" by Roman Emperor Justinian (r. 527–565). Sclaveni (Slavs) raided the western Balkans, including Bosnia, in the 6th century. The first mention of a Bosnian entity comes from the De Administrando Imperio (DAI in further text), which mention Bosnia (Βοσωνα/Bosona) as a "small/little land" or a "small country" (χοριον Βοσωνα/horion Bosona,) region part of Serbian Principality positioned in the upper course of the Bosna river.

Historical and archaeological information on early medieval Bosnia remains inadequate. According to DAI, Bosnia included two inhabited towns, Katera and Desnik. Katera has been thought to be identified as Kotorac near Sarajevo, however, according to Bulić 2013, archaeology refutes this. Katera may have been situated in the vicinity of modern-day Kotor Varoš, the potential site could be Bobac or Bobos, however, site only includes late medieval findings to date. Desnik remains wholly unidentified, but was thought to be near Dešanj.

==== Ecclesiastical organization ====
If DAI's kastra oikoumena does not designate inhabited towns, but ecclesiastical centers instead (in 6th century is mentioned Bestoen bishopric with several episcopal centers that belonged to Salonitan Archdiocese), as theorized by late Tibor Živković, the two towns in question might be Bistua (Zenica or Vitez) and Martar (probably Konjic). The existence of such centers is argued by Živković as evidence that it was an independent state before 822.

By the late 9th and early 10th century, Bosnia was mostly Christianized by Latin priests from the Dalmatian coastal towns, though remote pockets remained unreached. After the East–West Schism (1054) the newly formed Roman Catholic Diocese of Bosnia was under jurisdiction of the Archbishop of Split, but until the end of the 12th century changed jurisdiction between Split (1060, 1182), Bar (1089-1100, 1199) and Dubrovnik (1102, 1124, 1153). According to Provinciale vetus (late 12th century), its civitas was Bosna (considered as Visoko), and in the mid-11th century was one of 19 bishopric civitas of the Kingdom of Croatia and Dalmatia. In the 11-12th centuries the "Latin rite Christianity was prevalent in the west, the north and in central Bosnia", while the "Orthodox faith was predominant in the eastern districts near Serbia and the River Drina".

=== 9-11th century: Early political context ===
Based on lack of information from not always reliable historical sources, which again are mainly about nearby polities and peoples, there's no consensus on the political status of Bosnia before and during the 10th century. Some historians like Predrag Komatina consider that was part of Serbia also before its mention in DAI, other took into question the accuracy of DAI's account about being part of Serbia, while Trpimir Vedriš notes that the data in DAI "do not allow for reliable conclusions about Bosnia's position in relation to Serbia, nor about its organization in the earlier period". Francis Dvornik stated that "most probable-and this is accepted by most historians of the period [1960s]", initially formed as part of Croatia and later in the mid-10th century was ruled by Serbia. However, Komatina and Neven Budak conclude that the claim, about Bosnia being part of Croatia, which sometimes can be found in Croatian and Bosnian historiography, is not based on any historical source or evidence. Danijel Dzino considered that the "political and chronological context of this short passage could be connected with the rule of Časlav".

It is often argued in historiography that Northern and Northeastern Bosnia was captured by Carolingian Franks in the early 9th century and remained under their jurisdiction until 870s. In what is now eastern Herzegovina and Montenegro, semi-independent localities emerged under Serbian rule. In the late 9th or early 10th century Petar of Serbia pushed into Pagania, coming into conflict with Michael of Zahumlje. Croatian king Tomislav reintegrated parts of Western and Northern Bosnia, battling the Bulgarians in the Bosnian highlands (926). In 949, a civil war broke out in Croatia leading to the conquest of Bosnia by Časlav, but after his death in c. 940s/960s, it was possibly retaken by Michael Krešimir II of Croatia, or became politically independent. Bulgaria briefly subjugated Bosnia at the turn of the 10th century, after which followed period of Byzantine rule. In the early 11th century, Bosnia was briefly part of the state of Duklja. In 1019 Byzantine Emperor Basil II forced the Serb and Croat rulers (including Bosnians) to acknowledge Byzantine sovereignty, though this had little impact over the governance of Bosnia until the end of 11th century, for periods of time being governed by Croats or Serbs to the East. Noel Malcolm considered that a later political link to Croatia will be observed "by the Croatian title ban from the earliest times", but its use before the mid-12th century in sources (CPD) is probably an anachronism.

Various historiographical deductions aren't based on relevant and reliable information, being "imagined and claimed as parts of both the Serbian and the Croatian Lebensraum in the nineteenth century, and accordingly integrated into national biographies" and "historiographic traditions", as Danijel Dzino concludes:

"While the 'land' of Bosnia was a political fact at the time, and the attested existence of Bosnian bishopric is sufficient evidence for this, there is nothing in the written sources that gives more about its rulers or social developments in the tenth and eleventh centuries ... The parallels with Hum and other neighbouring 'lands' suggest that this period was characterized by a fluidity in political arrangements, suggesting that Bosnia must have had different overlords or political allies (Serbs, Croats, Bulgars, Byzantines, Dukljani) in this period, who left the management of local affairs to the local elite. Such an assumption certainly challenges the popular misconception of Bosnia being an integral part of these other states, but also challenges the notion of 'Bosnian statehood' in this period".

==== Mythical rulers ====
Based on semi-mythical Chronicle of the Priest of Duklja (CPD, 13-14th century, and mostly its Slavic redaction), the earliest mythical rulers of Transmontana (zagorska sklavinija) would be Silimir, Bladin, Ratimir (d. 838), followed by four unnamed rulers, then Satimir (c. 860 – c. 877), Budimir (877–917) and finally ban Svetolik-Stjepan (917 – d. 932/934). Svetolik-Stjepan fled to Hungary because Bosnia was conquered by Croatian king Crescimirus (Krešimir I or Michael Krešimir II), and that Crescimirus's son Stjepan (Stephen Držislav) and his descendants ruled over "White Croatia" and Bosnia. Samuel of Bulgaria (997–1014) during his conquest of Croatia moved freely through Bosnia and Serbia (which probably captured as well), but is without further evidence.

Later, according to the same CPD, Ljutovid of Zahumlje, an unnamed Ban of Bosnia, and unnamed župan of Raška (i.e. Serbia) accepted Byzantine's gifts in silver and gold to assist Michael Anastasii against Stefan Vojislav at the Battle of Bar (1042). Constantine Bodin reportedly conquered Bosnia and appointed first cousin Stephen (fl. 1084–1095) as the duke of Bosnia, and Stephen reportedly participated in the siege of Dubrovnik but there's "a number of inconsistencies and chronological problems".

According to later Annales Ragusini (14-17th century), the death of childless Stiepan in 871 was followed by 17 years war which was ended by Croatian ruler Bereslav's conquest of Bosnia, while in 972 Bosnian ruler was killed and land conquered by certain Sigr. Ducha d'Albania, but another ruler of the lineage of Moravia de Harvati (and related to previous Bosnian ruler) expelled Sigr. Ducha and united Bosnia.

=== 12th century: Official semi-independent polity ===
First reliable information about Bosnia dates from the early 12th century. Béla II of Hungary in 1135 adopted the title of King of Rama (possibly referring to Bosnia), and appointed his second son Ladislaus II of Hungary as Duke of Bosnia (Boznensem ducatum). With presumed Hungarian conquest and political influence, in the mid-12th century emerged Banate of Bosnia under its first ruler Ban Borić (fl. 1154–1163). After the Battle of Sirmium (1165–1167), the Byzantine–Hungarian treaty regards Bosnia "as part of Hungarian dominion taken by the Byzantines", and Byzantine emperor Manuel I Komnenos used in honorific title of the "dalmatikos, ougrikos, bosthnikos, krobatikos", and panegyric of Michael Anchialos mentioned to "let the Croat and the Bosnian be enrolled in the tables of the Romans". After 13 years of Byzantine rule and the return of the Hungarian rule over their South Slavic possessions, during the time of Ban Kulin (1180–1204) by practical means was an independent state, but that was constantly challenged by Hungarian kings who tried to reestablish their pre-Byzantine period authority or acted as "political seniors".

== Ethnopolitical identity ==
In the Early Middle Ages, Fine Jr. and Malcolm believe that westernmost parts of modern-day Bosnia and Herzegovina were part of Duchy of Croatia, while the easternmost parts were part of Principality of Serbia, although, the harsh and usually inaccessible elevated terrains of the country most likely never came under direct control of either of the two neighboring Slavic states, and instead always had its own distinct political governance. Budak concludes that the existence but also the steady growth of Bosnia as a separate province and eventually a separate state will enable the maintenance and development of Bosnian identity, which was not the case, for example, with Narentines, who remained a regional name. This is reinforced by the Byzantine historian John Kinnamos (mid-12th century), who wrote:

...When he [Manuel I Komnenos] approached the Sava, he crossed from it to another river, by name Drina, which takes its origin somewhat higher up and divides Bosnia from the rest of Serbia. Bosnia itself is not subject to the Serbs' grand Župan, but is a tribe which lives and is ruled separately.

According to Martin Dimnik, writing for The New Cambridge Medieval History, in the 11th century land of Bosnia lived both Croats and Serbs. Regarding the ethnic identity of the inhabitants of Bosnia until 1180, Malcolm concludes "it cannot be answered, for two reasons":

...first, because we lack evidence, and secondly, because the question lacks meaning. We can say that the majority of the Bosnian territory was probably occupied by Croats - or at least, by Slavs under Croat rule - in the seventh century; but that is a tribal label which has little or no meaning five centuries later. The Bosnians were generally closer to the Croats in their religious and political history; but to apply the modem notion of Croat identity (something constructed in recent centuries out of religion, history and language) to anyone in this period would be an anachronism. All that one can sensibly say about the ethnic identity of the Bosnians is this: they were the Slavs who lived in Bosnia.

== See also ==
- Usora (region)
- Soli (region)
- Visoko during the Middle Ages

== Sources ==
- Ferjančić, Božidar (1959). "Константин VII Порфирогенит". Византиски извори за историју народа Југославије. Vol. 2. Belgrade: Византолошки институт. pp. 1–98.
- Bataković, Dušan T. (1996). The Serbs of Bosnia & Herzegovina: History and Politics. Paris: Dialogue. ISBN 9782911527104.
- Budak, Neven (2018). Hrvatska povijest od 550. do 1100 [Croatian history from 550 until 1100]. Leykam international. ISBN 978-953-340-061-7.
- Bulić, Dejan (2013). "The Fortifications of the Late Antiquity and the Early Byzantine Period on the Later Territory of the South-Slavic Principalities, and their re-occupation". The World of the Slavs: Studies of the East, West and South Slavs: Civitas, Oppidas, Villas and Archeological Evidence (7th to 11th Centuries AD). Belgrade: The Institute for History. pp. 137–234. ISBN 9788677431044.
- Ćirković, Sima (2004). The Serbs. Malden: Blackwell Publishing. ISBN 9781405142915.
- Francis Dvornik; Romilly Jenkins; Bernard Lewis; Gyula Moravcsik; Dimitri Obolensky; Steven Runciman (1962). Jenkins, Romilly (ed.). De Administrando Imperio: Volume II Commentary. London: The Athlone Press, University of London. ISBN 9780884020219.
- Dzino, Danijel (2023). Early Medieval Hum and Bosnia, ca. 450-1200: Beyond Myths. Taylor & Francis. ISBN 9781000893434.
- Filipović, Milenko S. (2002). Visočka nahija (in Serbian). Mak.
- Curta, Florin (2006). Southeastern Europe in the Middle Ages, 500–1250. Cambridge: Cambridge University Press. ISBN 978-0-521-81539-0.
- Fine, John V. A. Jr. (1991) [1983]. The Early Medieval Balkans: A Critical Survey from the Sixth to the Late Twelfth Century. Ann Arbor: University of Michigan Press. ISBN 0-472-08149-7.
- Hadžijahić, Muhamed (2004). Povijest Bosne u IX i X stoljeću (from the original University of Michigan ed.). Sarajevo: Preporod. ISBN 9789958820274.
- Imamović, Mustafa (1996). Historija Bošnjaka (in Bosnian). Preporod. ISBN 978-9958-815-00-3.
- Kaimakamova, Miliana; Salamon, Maciej (2007). Byzantium, new peoples, new powers: the Byzantino-Slav contact zone, from the ninth to the fifteenth century. Towarzystwo Wydawnicze "Historia Iagellonica". ISBN 978-83-88737-83-1.
- Komatina, Predrag (2021). Константин Порфирогенит и рана историја Јужних Словена [Constantine Porphyrogenitus and the Early History of South Slavs]. Византолошки институт, Београд. ISBN 978-86-83883-28-8.
- Malcolm, Noel (1994). Bosnia: A Short History. Washington Square, New York: New York University Press. ISBN 0-8147-5520-8.
- Moravcsik, Gyula, ed. (1967) [1949]. Constantine Porphyrogenitus: De Administrando Imperio (2nd revised ed.). Washington D.C.: Dumbarton Oaks Center for Byzantine Studies. ISBN 9780884020219.
- Mrgić-Radojčić, Jelena (2004). "Rethinking the Territorial Development of the Medieval Bosnian State". Историјски часопис. 51: 43–64.
- Škegro, Ante (2005b). Stari pokrajinski katalog ili Katalog provincija Opće Crkve = Provinciale vetus sive Ecclesiae Universae provinciarum notitia [Old Provincial Cathalogue or Cathalogue of the Provinces of Universal Church = Provinciale vetus sive Ecclesiae Universae provinciarum notitia] (in Croatian). Zagreb: Croatian Institute of History. ISBN 953-6324-50-4.
- Vedriš, Trpimir (2015). "Balkanske sklavinije i Bugarska – Hrvatska u međunarodnom kontekstu" [Balkan 'sklavinias' and Bulgaria – Croatia in the international context]. In Zrinka Nikolić Jakus (ed.). Nova zraka u europskom svjetlu: Hrvatske zemlje u ranome srednjem vijeku (oko 550 − oko 1150) [Croatian lands in the Early Middle Ages (o. 550. – o. 1150.)] (in Croatian). Zagreb: Matica hrvatska. pp. 581–608. ISBN 978-953-150-942-8.
- Vego, Marko (1982). Postanak srednjovjekovne bosanske države. Sarajevo: Svjetlost.
- Živković, Tibor (2008). Forging unity: The South Slavs between East and West 550-1150. Belgrade: The Institute of History. ISBN 9788675585732.
- Živković, Tibor (2010a). "On the Beginnings of Bosnia in the Middle Ages". Spomenica akademika Marka Šunjića (1927-1998). Sarajevo: Filozofski fakultet. pp. 161–180.
- Živković, Tibor (2010b). "O počecima Bosne u ranom srednjem vijeku". Godišnjak Centra za balkanološka ispitivanja (39): 149–161.
