= Battle of Bar =

Battle in the Balkans in 1042/1043

- Part of the Byzantine–Serbian wars
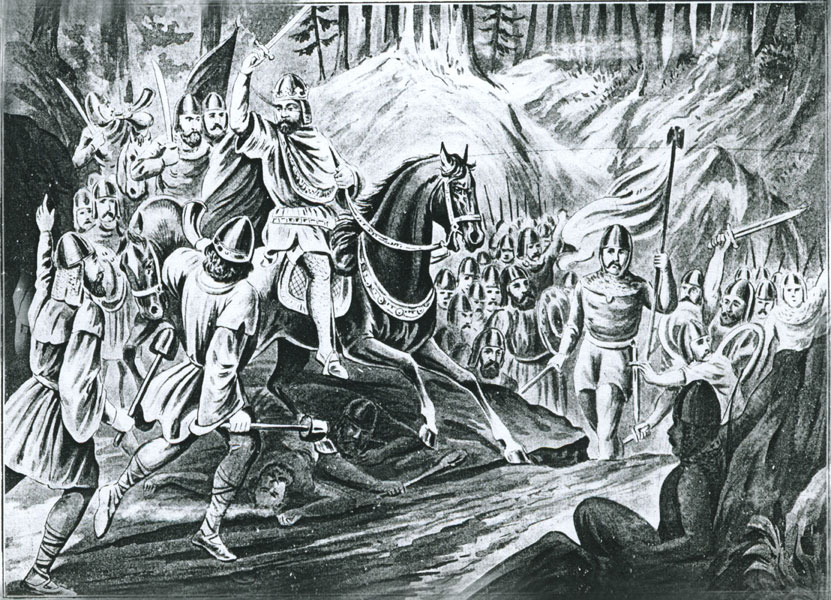
Date	1042/1043
Location	Bar, Duklja (now Montenegro)
Result	Doclean Serb victory

Belligerents
Duklja	Byzantine Empire; Zachlumia

Commanders and leaders
Stefan Vojislav	Michaelus Anastasii; Curcilius; Ljutovid of Zahumlje

Strength
Unknown	60,000

Casualties and losses
Low	14,000 killed 7 strategoi killed

The Battle of Bar (Serbian Cyrillic: Битка код Бара, romanized: Bitka kod Bara) took place in 1042 or 1043, between the army of Stefan Vojislav, the Serbian ruler of Duklja, and Byzantine forces led by Michaelus Anastasii governor of Dyrrhachium and local Slavic vassals.

The battle was actually an ambush on the Byzantine forces in the mountain gorge, which ended in the utter defeat of the Byzantine forces. Following the defeat and retreat of the Byzantines, Vojislav ensured a future for Duklja without imperial authority, and Duklja would soon emerge as the most significant Serb state.

== Background ==
Prior to the war, Duklja and other Slavic principalities were subordinated to the suzerainty of the Byzantine Empire. However, around the start of the 11th century, Stefan Vojislav waged a series of successful activities aimed at independence. There exist two different but closely related narratives of the events, one described by near contemporary John Skylitzes and the other by 14th century Chronicle of the Priest of Duklja (CPD).

According to Skylitzes, after Vojislav escaped from Constantinople in 1039, he began expanding in Byzantines districts (including Serbia by defeating Theophilos Erotikos), and looted a Byzantine ship full of gold which did not want to return to the emperor Michael IV the Paphlagonian provoking arrival of an imperial army led by Georgios Probatas in 1040 but was defeated by Vojislav. The new emperor Constantine IX Monomachos ordered Michael, then governor of Dyrrhachium, "to assemble an army together with the armies of the 'neighbouring themes' and ipostrategoi subordinated to him, and to proceed against Stephen Vojislav".

According to CPD, Vojislav (called as Dobroslav), then a subordinate of the Byzantines, started a silent revolt with local Slavs because the Greeks committed adultery with their wives and rape of their daughters. Withdrawing the Byzantine authority, went to plunder lands of other Byzantine allies. Byzantine emperor sent general Armenopolos who in attempt to subdue Vojislav was defeated. Then the emperor sent piles of imperial gold and silver to the Župan of Rascia (i.e. Serbia), Ban of Bosnia and Ljutovid of Zahumlje to military assist the army of Cursilius, the toparch of Dyrrachium, against Vojislav.

Here the narratives seemingly correlate and is considered that probably all were allied in the huge army led by Michael.

== Pre-battle ==
According to Skylitzes, the Byzantine 60,000 strong army, led by the dux Michael, moved towards Duklja in order to suppress the revolts, and they set up camp in the area near Bar. Vojislav and his forces, which are considered to be greatly inferior to the Byzantines, fled into Triballos mountains.

Skylitzes described the Byzantine invasion of Duklja (in Latin translation by Immanuel Bekker):

Servis, ut fertur, dedita opera cedentibus ac intrare eum sinentibus, neque de reditu solicitum neque iusto praesidio angustias occupantem. ita ingressus campestria direptionibus incendiisque vastabat. at Servi fauces itinerum ac praerupta insidere et reditum eius praestolari.

It is said that the Serbs had deliberately let them enter [Duklja], while he [Michael] took no care about their return, nor did he leave sufficiently strong guard in the gorges. After the incursion, he plundered and burned plains, while the Serbs took and kept the gorges and steep places along the road and waited for the return [of the Byzantine army].

== Battle ==
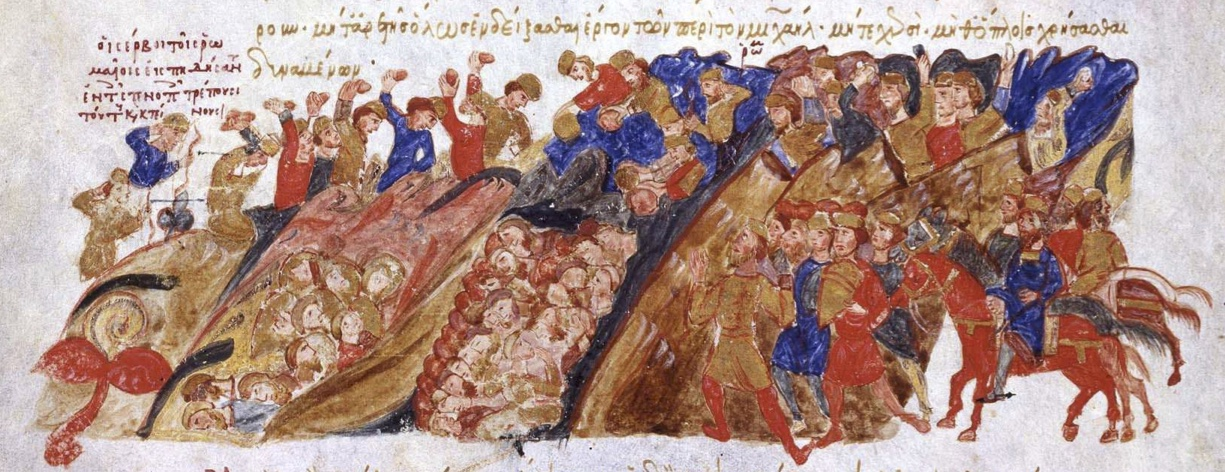
Serbs massacre the Byzantines in the mountain passes, Madrid Skylitzes

The battle took place in the mountainous area between Bar and Crmnica after midnight. According to the CPD, Vojislav along with five of his sons (two of them being Gojislav and Radoslav), led the forces into battle. Their army slowly moved down the hills along with shouting and blowing horns and trumpets to exaggerate their size. Prior to the battle a double agent man entered the Byzantine camp to spread false information about a huge army, causing additional panic among the Byzantines. The Byzantines, trapped in the mountainous area, were caught unprepared and after heavy fighting were routed. Both leaders Cursilius and Ljutovid died of wounds, with the latter after personal conflict with Gojislav. After the conflict, Vojislav reportedly invaded Zachlumia and captured "all the lands of Dyrrachium as far as the river Vjossa" (but in vain as soon died, causing rift between his sons).

The Strategikon described the outcome of the battle:

ὁποῖον ἐποίησεν ὁ Τριβούνιος ὁ Σέρβος τῷ κατεπάνω Δυρραχίου Μιχαὴλ τῷ τοῦ λογοθέτου υἱῷ εἰς Διοκλείαν καὶ ἀπώλεσε τὸν λαὸν αὐτοῦ ἐπέκεινα τῶν τεσσαράκοντα χιλιαδῶν ὄντα.

Thus the Travunian Serb [Vojislav] did in Duklja to the katepano of Dyrrhachium, Michael, son of logothete, and he destroyed his army that numbered more than 40,000.
