= Stefan Vojislav =

- Prince of the Serbs (ὁ τῶν Σέρβων ἄρχων); Prince of Serbia Toparch of the Dalmatian kastra of Zeta and Ston

Prince of Duklja
- Reign: 1018–1043
- Predecessor: Dragimir
- Successor: Neda
- Died: 1043
- Burial: Church of St. Andrew, Prapratna
- Spouse: Neda
- Issue: Gojislav, Predimir, Mihailo I, Saganek, Radoslav
- Dynasty: Vojislavljević (founded)
- Father: Dragimir
- Religion: Chalcedonian Christianity

Stefan Vojislav (Serbian Cyrillic: Стефан Војислав, Greek: Στέφανος Βοϊσθλάβος; fl. 1034–d. 1043) was the Prince of Duklja from 1018 to 1043. Beginning in the year 1018, he served as a Byzantine governor, until 1034 when he led an unsuccessful revolt that landed him in a prison at Constantinople. He managed to escape and returned home, this time successfully gaining the independence of his statelet and expanding his rule over southern Dalmatia and its hinterland. He is the eponymous founder of the Vojislavljević dynasty.

== Origin and early life ==
The contemporary Byzantine writers call him either a Serb or a Dukljan (Βοϊσθλάβος ὁ Διοκλητιανός), but do not mention his genealogy, while the Chronicle of the Priest of Duklja, a posterior, more dubious source, calls him a cousin to previous ruler Jovan Vladimir (r. 990–1016). Having reached its pinnacle during the long reign of emperor Basil II, the Byzantine Empire entered a steady decline following his death in 1025. This was particularly evident in the Balkans, where the elimination of the perennial Bulgarian threat combined with an insensitive taxation policy helped spur liberation movements. Vojislav the Dukljan held the title of archon, and toparch of the Dalmatian kastra of Zeta and Ston

(ἦν δὲ εἰς τὰ κάστρα Δαλματίας εἰς τὴν Ζένταν καὶ εἰς τὴν Στάμνον τοπάρχης Βοϊσθλάβος ὁ Διοκλητιανός).

The affairs of the Dalmatians, Serbs, Croats and others were overseen by strategoi in Niš, Skopje, Ragusa (Dubrovnik) and Dyrrhachium. Vojislav had regular meetings with Katakalon Klazomenites (Catacalon), the strategos of Ragusa, and at one occasion, kidnapped him and his party because Vojislav wanted him to be the godfather to his son Katakalon at his baptism. This shows a close relationship between native leaders and Byzantine officers in the peripheral zone of the Empire after Basil's "reconquest".

== Revolts ==
...Stefan Vojislav, arhon of Serbs, who not long ago escaped from Constantinople and took the land of the Serbs, banishing Theophilos Erotikos.

— -John Skylitzes

Around 1034 (according to John Skylitzes), the Dukljans renounced Byzantine rule. Stefan Vojislav, cousin of the murdered Jovan Vladimir, organized a rebellion taking advantage of the death of the emperor Romanos III Argyros. He was defeated and imprisoned in Constantinople in 1035/1036 while his realm was put under the control of the strategos Theophilos Erotikos. In late 1037 or early 1038, he managed to break out of the prison and returned to Duklja, where he organized a new rebellion, also targeting the Serb allies of the Emperor in the neighbouring regions.

By means of guerilla tactics and the distracting effects of other uprisings, he staved off several punitive expeditions and asserted partial control over the principalities of Travunija and Zahumlje. Thus, by 1040 his state stretched in the coastal region from Ston in the north, down to his capital, Skadar, set up along the southern banks of the Skadar Lake, with other courts set up in Trebinje, Kotor and Bar.

== Wars with Byzantines ==
=== 1039 ===
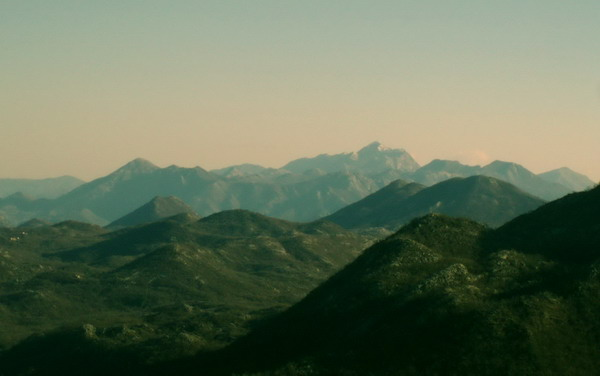
Rumija, where Vojislav defeated the Byzantine armies

In 1039, the Byzantine Emperor Michael IV the Paphlagonian was waiting in Thessalonica for a shipment of 10 kentenars of gold (7,200 gold nomismata) coming from his provinces in Southern Italy, but the cargo ship (galley) was wrecked off the Doclean coast due to stormy weather in the winter and the goods were taken by Vojislav, who refused to return it upon Michael's requests. The emperor, who had already retaken Dyrrhachium, became furious and sent general George Probatas to tackle Vojislav, but the Byzantine army, unfamiliar with the terrain, was ambushed in the gorges and totally defeated. Vojislav's son, Radoslav, is noted as having killed a Byzantine military commander on the battlefield. Kekaumenos, a strategos sent for Vojislav, ended up imprisoned by Vojislav and taken to Ston. The 1040-41 Uprising of Peter Delyan, who crowned himself "Czar Peter of the Bulgarians", made another Byzantine incursion against Duklja unlikely as the Byzantines were now occupied by the Bulgarian advance.

=== 1042 ===
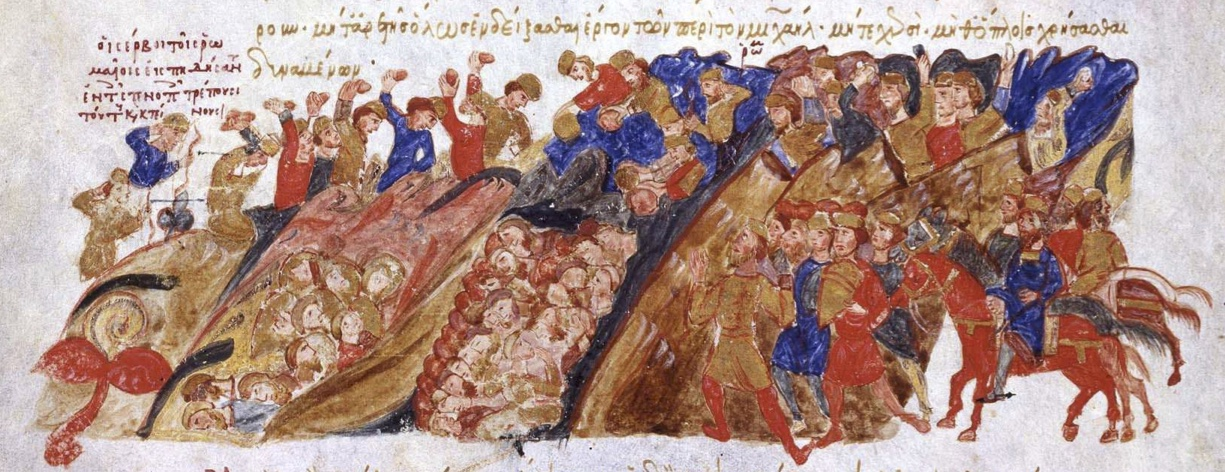
Serbs massacre the Byzantines in the mountain passes, Madrid Skylitzes

In 1042, the new emperor Constantine IX decided to attack Duklja with an army based in Dyrrhachium and the neighbouring themes. the župan of Raška (a renewed subordinate title, showing Byzantine overlordship), Ban of Bosnia and Prince of Hum Ljutovid, received a large sum of imperial gold and silver for their support to overthrow Vojislav.

The battle took place in the mountainous area between Bar and Crmnica after midnight in 1042. Prior to the battle a man entered the Byzantine camp and spread false information about a huge enemy army, causing panic among the Byzantines. Stefan Vojislav, along with three of his sons, led the Dukljans into battle. They slowly moved down the hills along with shouting and blowing horns and trumpets so it would exaggerate their appearance. The Byzantines were trapped in the mountainous area, as the Dukljans blocked the passage. They caught the Byzantines unprepared and managed to cause chaos among their ranks and after heavy fighting routed the remaining Byzantine forces. The Byzantine army under Michaelus Anastasii was defeated and Vojislav ensured a future for Duklja without imperial authority.

== Last years ==
Vojislav spent the rest of his rule in peace and died in 1043. He was succeeded by his widow and their five sons - Gojislav, Predimir, Mihailo, Saganek and Radoslav. He was buried in the Church of St. Andrew in Prapratna, a town between Bar and Ulcinj. Duklja remained the center of the Serbian state, replacing (in terms of leadership) the inner regions (Grand Principality of Serbia i.e. Raška); it held this position for a few decades, under the rule of his son Mihailo I in Duklja while the other regions were later united under Vukan I of Serbia.

== Titles ==
- "archon, and toparch of the Dalmatian kastra of Zeta and Ston", his Byzantine title, according to the Strategikon of Kekaumenos (1075–78).
- "Prince of the Serbs" (ὁ τῶν Σέρβων ἄρχων), according to John Skylitzes (fl. 1057–59).
- "Prince of Serbia", according to George Kedrenos (fl. 1050s).

== See also ==
- List of Serbian rulers
- House of Vojislavljević

== Annotations ==
1. Name: His name is Vojislav (Greek: Βοϊσθλάβος), he added the self-styled title Stefan, originating from the Greek word Στέφανος (Stephanos) meaning "crowned". Kekaumenos also calls him "Vojislav the Diokletian" and "Tribounios the Serb" (Τριβούνιος ό Σέρβος). His name is transliterated in Latin as Stephanus Boisthlabus, and in English as Stephen Voislav. In the Chronicle of the Priest of Duklja, he is called Dobroslav, although this is the only source that calls him with that name.
2. Origin and Genealogy:
  - Skylitzes, Zonaras, Cedrenus, Glykas, Kekaumenos call him a Serb (Σέρβος), or Dukljan (Βοϊσθλάβος ὁ Διοκλητιανός).
  - According to the Chronicles of the Priest of Doclea (of somewhat dubious historical value), Vojislav was born in the month of April, in Brusno, to the uncle of Jovan Vladimir, Prince Dragomir (r. 1016-1018), and the daughter of Raškan župan Ljutomir (possible fabrication of Ljutovid) and was raised in Bosnia by his mother. His father had succeeded Jovan Vladimir in 1016, and ruled until his murder by Kotor locals in 1018.Lazarević

== Sources ==
=== Primary sources ===
- Шишић, Фердо, ed. (1928). Летопис Попа Дукљанина (Chronicle of the Priest of Duklja). Београд-Загреб: Српска краљевска академија.
- Кунчер, Драгана (2009). Gesta Regum Sclavorum. Vol. 1. Београд-Никшић: Историјски институт, Манастир Острог.
- Живковић, Тибор (2009). Gesta Regum Sclavorum. Vol. 2. Београд-Никшић: Историјски институт, Манастир Острог.
- Thurn, Hans, ed. (1973). Ioannis Scylitzae Synopsis historiarum. Berlin-New York: De Gruyter. ISBN 9783110022858.

=== Secondary sources ===
- Ćirković, Sima (2004). The Serbs. Malden: Blackwell Publishing. ISBN 9781405142915.
- Curta, Florin (2006). Southeastern Europe in the Middle Ages, 500–1250. Cambridge: Cambridge University Press.
- Fine, John Van Antwerp Jr. (1991) [1983]. The Early Medieval Balkans: A Critical Survey from the Sixth to the Late Twelfth Century. Ann Arbor, Michigan: University of Michigan Press. ISBN 0472081497.
- Jeffreys, Michael; et al., eds. (2011). "Voislav Stefan, ruler of the Serbians". Prosopographical Reading of Byzantine Sources, 1025-1150. Prosopography of the Byzantine World.
- Krsmanović, Bojana (2008). The Byzantine Province in Change: On the Threshold Between the 10th and the 11th Century. Belgrade: Institute for Byzantine Studies. ISBN 9789603710608.
- Lazarević, Dragana (2014). "The Invention of the Balkan Identities: Finding the Founding Fathers and the Myths of Origin - the Montenegrin Case". Историја и географија: Сусрети и прожимања. Београд: Институт за новију историју Србије. pp. 423–443. ISBN 9788670051256.
- Komatina, Predrag (2012). "Srbija i Duklja u delu Jovana Skilice" (PDF). Zbornik radova. XLIX. Vizantološki institut.
- Stephenson, Paul (2003a). The Legend of Basil the Bulgar-Slayer. Cambridge: Cambridge University Press. ISBN 9780521815307.
- Stephenson, Paul (2003b). "The Balkan Frontier in the Year 1000". Byzantium in the Year 1000. Leiden-Boston: Brill. pp. 109–134. ISBN 9004120971.
- Vlasto, Alexis P. (1970). The Entry of the Slavs into Christendom: An Introduction to the Medieval History of the Slavs. Cambridge: Cambridge University Press. ISBN 9780521074599.
- Živković, Tibor (2008). Forging unity: The South Slavs between East and West 550-1150. Belgrade: The Institute of History, Čigoja štampa. ISBN 9788675585732.

Stefan Vojislav Vojislavljević Born: 1000 Died: 1043
Regnal titles
Vacant Byzantine rule Title last held by Jovan Vladimir	Prince of Dioclea; 1040–1043	Succeeded by Neda
Political offices
First	Byzantine toparch of Zeta and Ston; 1018–1034 (?)	Succeeded by Theophilos Erotikos
