= Nikoulitzas Delphinas =

Nikoulitzas Delphinas (Greek: Νικουλιτζάς Δελφινάς (Note: His first name is a Hellenization of the Slavic Nikulitsa or Nikolitsa. Other variations of his surname are Delphinus and the shortened version Delphin.)) was an 11th-century Byzantine magnate and local lord of Larissa, in Thessaly. He took part in a revolt initiated by the Vlachs of Thessaly in 1066.

== Biography ==
It is uncertain whether Nikoulitzas may have been an ethnic Greek or an ethnic Vlach, as Vlachs could have been considered by Byzantine chroniclers at the time as Greeks. He was the grandson of Nikulitsa, the governor of Servia and archon of the Vlachs of Hellas. The younger Nikoulitzas bore the rank of protospatharios, but is not known to have had any official position.

Nikoulitzas had his own fortress with a garrison of men, and was one of the most powerful lords of Thessaly. The Vlachs and Slavs of the region started planning a revolt in 1065, prompted by the taxation increases and corruption in the same area. When Nikoulitzas heard this from his spies he went to Constantinople to warn the Emperor Constantine X Doukas, but the Emperor dismissed him and no measures were taken.

Upon returning to Larissa, Nikoulitzas saw the growing movement and tried to talk the rebels out of it. They insisted on Nikoulitzas becoming their leader, as he had a fort and a private army. Nikoulitzas declined, as his two sons were in Constantinople, fearing they would come in harm's way. The rebels, however, forced Nikoulitzas to take a leadership position and the revolt began.

The revolt ended by negotiation, but the Emperor captured Nikoulitzas and imprisoned him in Amaseia, on the Black Sea coast of Asia Minor. His son-in-law was the writer Kekaumenos, whose Strategikon is the only source on him and the revolt.
