= Ljutomir =

Serbian noble

- Title: Duke of Rascia (?)

Ljutomir of Serbia (also Lubomir) is a potentially mythological governor of Rascia during its annexation by the Byzantine Empire (sometime between 976 and 1043). His only mention is in the Chronicle of the Priest of Duklja, a dubious document dating to 1298–1300 (additions date to as late as 16th century), where it says he was "a Rascian Duke" who married a noblewoman of Bosnia; they had a daughter who married Dragomir of Doclea.

According to some, Ljutomir may be the same person as Ljutovid, the Byzantine strategos of Serbia and Hum.

== Sources ==
- Sisic, F. (ed.), Stephenson, P. (trans. 1998) Chronicle of the Priest of Duklja, Johannes Lucius (1666) De Regno Dalmatiæ et Croatiæ (Amsterdam), available at <http://homepage.mac.com/paulstephenson/trans/lpd.1.htm%5B‍%5D> (10 Jan 2007) (extract only), XL.
- Živković, Tibor (2008). Forging unity: The South Slavs between East and West 550-1150. Belgrade: The Institute of History, Čigoja štampa.
