= Papyrus Oxyrhynchus 287 =

Greek papyrus fragment

Papyrus Oxyrhynchus 287 (P. Oxy. 287 or P. Oxy. II 287) is a fragment of a Payment of Corn, in Greek. It was discovered in Oxyrhynchus. The manuscript was written on papyrus in the form of a sheet. It is dated to the 23 November 23. Currently it is housed in the library of the Columbia University (Head of Special Collections) in New York City.

== Description ==
The measurements of the fragment are 125 by 110 mm. The document is mutilated.

The document is a petition was written by an unknown author, and was addressed to the sitologi of a division of the lower toparchy.

This papyrus was discovered by Grenfell and Hunt in 1897 in Oxyrhynchus. The text was published by Grenfell and Hunt in 1899.

== See also ==
- Oxyrhynchus Papyri
