= Byzantine–Serbian wars =

6th-14th century wars

Byzantine-Serbian Wars
Date	6th century–14th century AD
Location	Balkans
Result	Inconclusive: Serbia conquers the majority of the Byzantine Empire by the 14th century; Both states were gradually conquered by the Ottoman Empire
Territorial changes	Both states had numerous territorial changes.

Belligerents
Byzantine Empire	Medieval Serbian states: Principality of Serbia; Duklja; Grand Principality of Serbia; (Kingdom of Serbia (medieval)) Kingdom of Serbia; Serbian Empire

Commanders and leaders
Byzantine emperors: Heraclius; Alexios I Komnenos; Constantine IX Monomachos; Manuel I Komnenos; Isaac II Angelos; Michael VIII Palaiologos; Andronikos II Palaiologos; Andronikos III Palaiologos; John VI Kantakouzenos; Matthew Kantakouzenos (POW)	Serbian dukes, kings and emperors: Stefan Vojislav; Mihailo I Constantine Bodin (POW); Vukan I Uroš II; Beloš; Desa; Stefan Nemanja; Stefan Nemanjic; Stefan Uroš I Stefan Dragutin; Stefan Uroš II Milutin; Stefan Uroš III Dečanski; Stefan Uroš IV Dušan; Stefan Uroš V

The Byzantine–Serbian wars were a series of wars between the Byzantine Empire and the medieval Serbian states. Starting with the Sclaveni and Antae migrations into the Balkans, the succession of medieval Serbian states went through several periods of warfare with the Eastern Roman Empire.

== Early contact between Constantinople and the Slavs ==
Some of the earliest belligerent contacts between Byzantium and the Slavs was during the Avar-Byzantine wars during the late 6th century, during which much of the Avar army was made up of Pannonian Slavs. During this period of invasion, often thought to be spanning from 574-588, the regions of Thracia and Moesia were devastated by up to a hundred thousand Sclaveni.

=== Slavic invasions of the Balkans ===
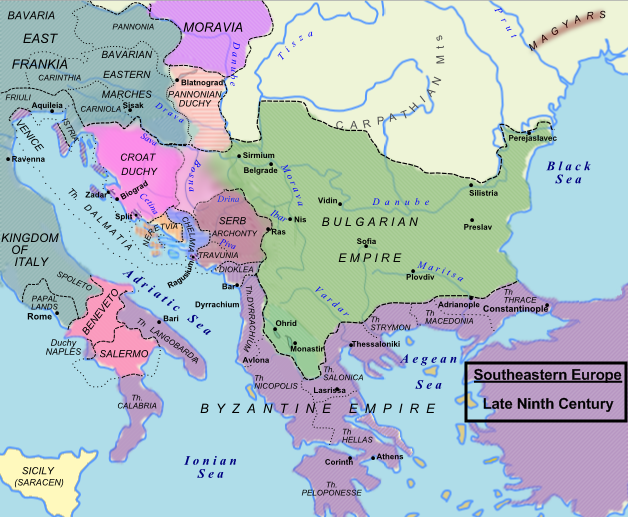
Serbian Principality in 850

The settlement of the Southern Slavs in the Eastern Roman Empire began in the mid-5th century with Slavic tribes along the Danube in Bavaria and Pannonia crossing over and settling in modern-day Bosnia and Croatia, slowly settling in Moesia, Scythia Minor, and Epirus, with some tribes moving as far south as the Peloponnese. During the 620s, an unnamed Serbian prince led the White Serbs across the Danube to settle the western Balkans during the reign of Heraclius. These and many other Slavic tribes that settled in Sirmium, Moesia Superior, and nearby regions soon emerged as a unified Serbian cultural and political identity, emerging as the Principality of Serbia under the descendants of the unnamed Serbian prince.

=== Principality of Serbia ===
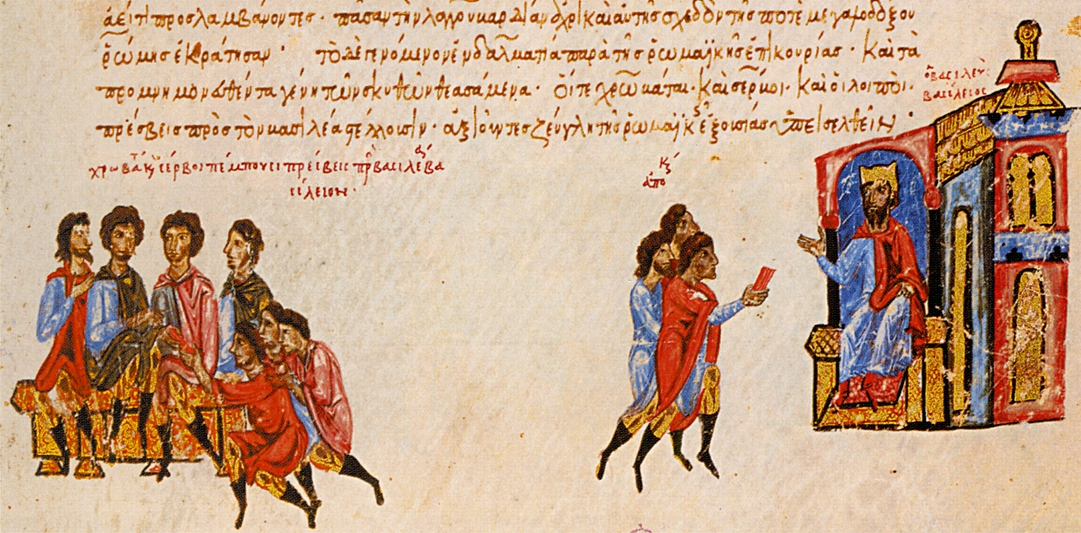
Byzantine Emperor Basil I receiving delegations of Serbs

During most of the existence of this early medieval Serbian state, organized much like a confederation of tribes, headed by a Vlastimirović prince, the Serbs spent very little time in opposition to the Byzantine state. Much of the focus in the 8th and early 9th centuries was against Arab fleets, which often came into the Adriatic. The small amount of aggression between Serbs and Byzantines came from the limited Narentine piracy of Venetian trade vessels, which was responded to with several Venetian crackdowns in Pagania. Following the death of Časlav Vlastimirović, the principality split into Duklja under the Vojislavljević dynasty and several smaller principalities, while the rest was annexed by the Byzantine Empire, which began to recover lost territory and by 1025 reached its highest territorial peak since the Arab conquests of Egypt and the Levant.

== Grand Principality of Serbia ==
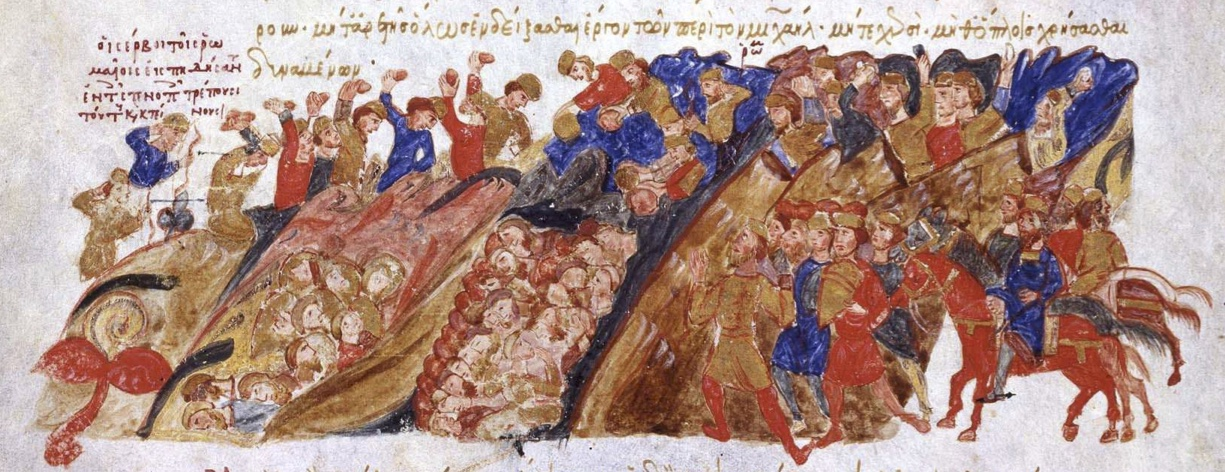
Serbs massacre the Byzantines in the mountain passes, Madrid Skylitzes

The Grand Principality of Serbia regained its independence under Vukan Vojislavljević in the early 1090s, taking advantage of Alexios Komnenos' preoccupation in the struggle against the invading Seljuks. This power was quickly consolidated after the Serbs defeated a Byzantine army sent to pacify them in 1092 and obtained recognition from Alexios in two separate treaties between 1093 and 1095. Violations of this treaty were common, and the Serbian-Byzantine borders would often shift, especially around the cities of Niš and Skopje. Vukan went on to found the Vukanović cadet branch of the Vojislavljević dynasty, which would rule over Raška, Zeta, Niš, and other regions until Stefan Nemanja defeated his brother Tihomir, who had been supported by a Byzantine army, and took the throne for himself, founding the Nemanjić branch.

=== Stefan Nemanja ===
While the Vojislavljevići were better about keeping their pacts with the Byzantines, both them and their successors, the Nemanjići, were rather keen on taking territory from the declining state, whose last powerful Basileus, Manuel Komnenos, died in 1180. Following his demise, almost all remaining Byzantine holdings on the Adriatic Sea save Ragusa were conquered by Nemanja. A few years later, as the Catholic armies of the Third Crusade were keeping the Ayyubids occupied, Isaac Angelos turned his attention towards reconquering lost territories in the Balkans, primarily Bulgaria, but after that campaign failed he attacked Serbia instead, drawing an early victory on the Morava River and driving Nemanja into the mountains. However, domestic issues began to rise up in Constantinople, and that on top of Isaac's admiration for Nemanja, led the Basileus to abandon his campaign to reconquer Serbia.

== Serbian Empire ==
=== Stefan Dušan ===
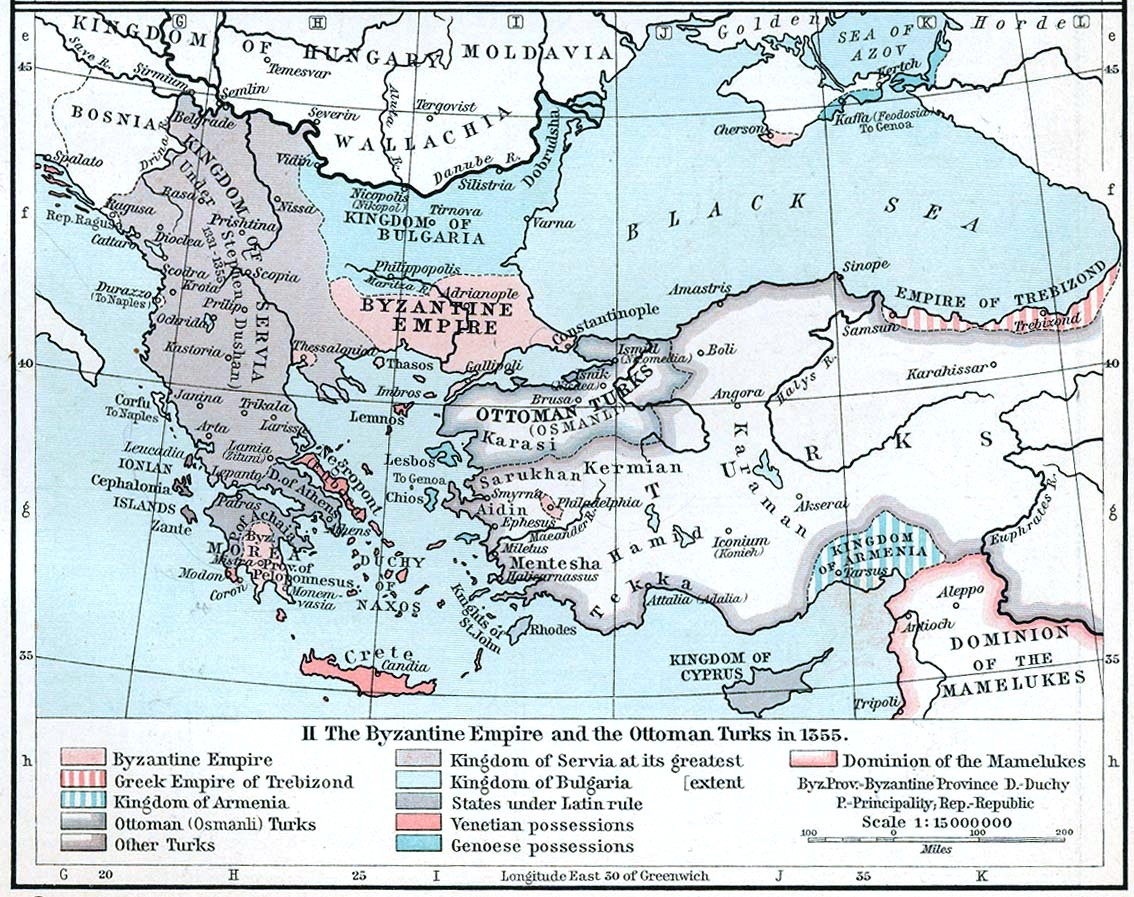
Byzantine & Serbian Empires in 1355

In 1331 young Stefan Uroš IV Dušan rose to the Serbian throne and over the course of twenty years conquered Epirus, Albania, the lands around Thessalonica, and much of Thessaly from the dwindling Byzantine Empire, founding the Serbian Empire. Dušan had taken advantage of Constantinople's situation, which was very preoccupied battling constant Turkish raids, civil unrest, and dynastic revolts. This conquest of Greece did not last long as his successor, Stefan Uroš V, was a considerably weaker leader, and Dušan's empire had entirely collapsed into small provinces by the 1370s, and were conquered by the early 15th century. The fall of the Serbian Empire marked the end of the Byzantine-Serbian wars, as Byzantium itself had become so small that it no longer shared a border with any Serbian polities. Byzantium shared the same fate as the Serbian provinces, being both conquered by the Ottoman Empire in 1450s.
