= Mijušković =

Mijušković (Serbian Cyrillic: Мијушковић, pronounced [mǐjuʃkoʋitɕ, - mijǔː-]) is a Serbo-Croatian surname. Notable people with the surname include:

- Jovanka Kalić-Mijušković (born 1933), Serbian historian
- Jovan Mijušković (born 1944), Serbian doctor and politician
- Mile Mijušković (born 1985), Montenegrin handball player
- Nemanja Mijušković (born 1992), Montenegrin footballer
- Slavko Mijušković (1912–1989), Yugoslav historian
