= Prapratna =

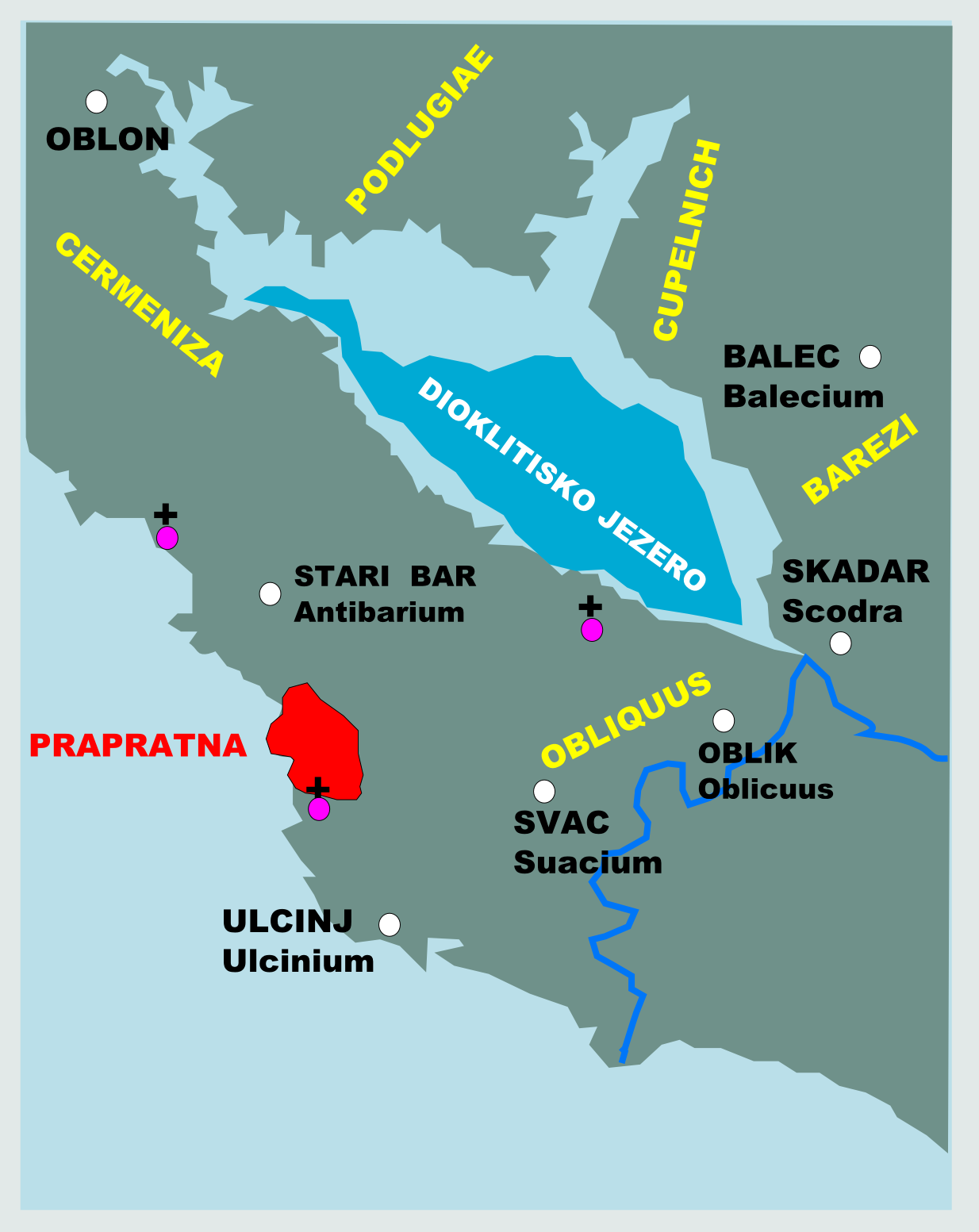
Location of Prapratna.

Prapratna (Serbian Cyrillic: Прапратна, Greek: Πραπράτοις) was a župa (county) in Duklja, and one of the courts of Mihailo I of Duklja (r. 1050–1081), alongside Dekatera (Kotor), according to Byzantine chronicler John Skylitzes (fl. 1057–59).

According to the later, somewhat dubious source, Chronicle of the Priest of Duklja, a ruler named Hvalimir who was alleged to be an ancestor of Jovan Vladimir (ca. 990–1016), held Zeta and its towns, and the following counties: Lusca (Luška), Podlugiae (Podlužje), Gorsca (Gorska), Cupelnich (Kupelnik), Obliquus (Oblik), Prapratna, Cermeniza (Crmnica) and Budua (Budva) with Cuceva (Kučevo) and Gripuli (Grbalj). Furthermore, it states that Stefan Vojislav (r. 1018–1043) was buried in the court church of St. Andrew in Prapratna.

Czech historian Konstantin Josef Jireček (1854–1918), in 1879, identified Prapratna with Papratnica in the Crmnica valley of the Principality of Montenegro. The etymology is derived from praprat, "fern", which grow in the region. It is thought to have been situated south of Bar, having been inhabited by the Mrkovići tribe (Mrkojevići).

== Sources ==
- Шишић, Фердо, ed. (1928). Летопис Попа Дукљанина (Chronicle of the Priest of Duklja). Београд-Загреб: Српска краљевска академија.
