= Mrkojevići =

Historical tribe and region of Montenegro

Coordinates: 42°00′N 19°13′E

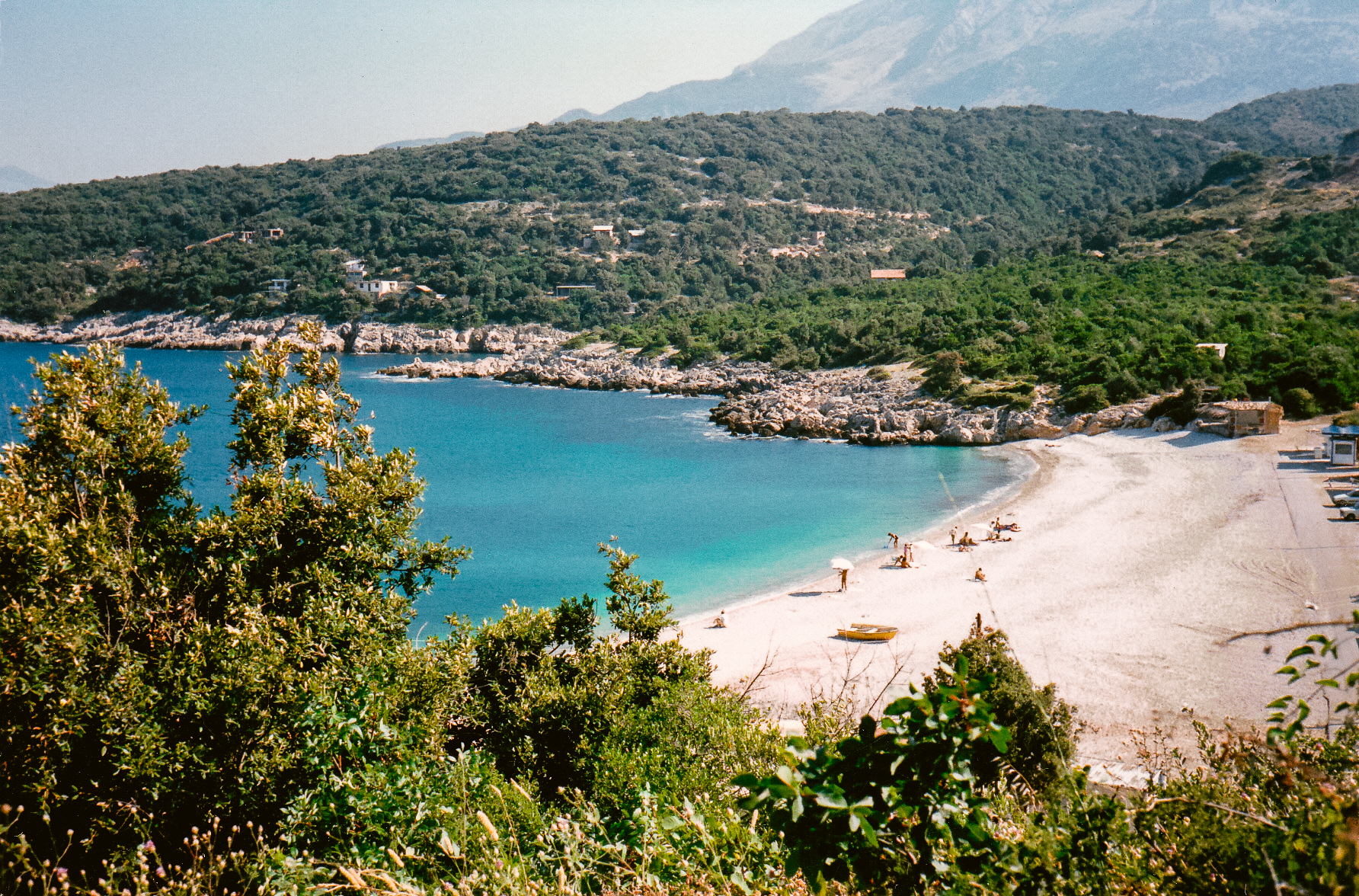
Mrkojevići riviera 1970

Mrkojevići (alternatively Mrkovići, Montenegrin Cyrillic: Мркојевићи/Мрковићи, Albanian: Mërkot) is a historical tribe and region in southwestern Montenegro, located between the towns of Bar and Ulcinj. The region borders Krajina to the east. The Mrkojevići form a distinct ethno-geographical group with their own dialect of the Serbo-Croatian language, while also exhibiting a degree of bilingualism in Albanian. Their customs are distinct from their neighbouring Slavic and Albanian communities, but they also show influence and contacts with them. In the 400-year Ottoman period, the Mrkojevići converted to Islam, which forms an important aspect of their cultural identity.

== Geography ==
The region is in the southern parts of Bar Municipality and forms one of its communal municipalities. There are nine settlements: Velje Selo, Dabezići, Dobra Voda, Gorana (Mala and Velja), Grdovići, Kunje, Ljeskovac, Pelinkovići and Pečurice. The historical settlements of the tribal region also include Međreč and Mali/Velji Mikulići but as of 2011 they have no inhabitants. Mrkojevići is divided into pravi Mrkojevići (true Mrkojevići or Mrkojevići proper) that is closer the city of Bar and the Gorana sub-region to the south. Dobra Voda, Pečurice, Grdovići, Velje Selo, Dabezići, Ljeskovac, Međreč and Mali/Velji Mikulići belong to pravi Mrkojevići, while Mala/Velja Gorana, Kunje, Pelinkovići to the Gorana sub-region.

== History ==
Located south of Bar, the current tribal region of the Mrkojevići would have been the location of the župa of Prapratna in the 11th century. The Mrkojevići themselves are first mentioned in Venetian sources in 1409 (Li Marchoe) and 1449 (de Marchois), as being located near Bar. In 1442, they supported the Venetians in seizing Bar and, as a reward, gained acknowledgment of their estates and partial tax relief, privileges further reinforced in 1448, when they once again allied with the Venetians in a conflict near Bar. This time, they earn complete tax exemption, a yearly stipend, and an increase in their territorial possessions.

The Mrkojevići are not a tribe of the same patrilineal ancestry, but a community of different clans that have settled over time in the area. The Mrkojevići tribe was therefore not formed on the basis of kinship, but on a territorial basis. Mrkojevići's first clan, mentioned in the 15th century, formed the first nucleus, whose name eventually extended to the whole tribal region at the end of the 19th century.

Following the Ottoman conquest of Upper Zeta in 1474 and the subsequent fall of Scutari in 1479, the Mrkojevići are mentioned as a distinct nahiya in the 1485 defter of the newly created Sanjak of Scutari. Called the nahiya of Merkodlar, it consisted of a single settlement with 140 households. In comparison to the demographic data of southern Montenegro and northern Albania whose settlements rarely had more than 100 households at the time, this settlement, which was probable spread around smaller clusters, was one of the biggest settlements in the borderlands of the Ottoman Empire and the Venetian coastal cities. The register of the household heads of pravi Mrkojevići shows that a majority of their names and patronyms were of Orthodox Slavic origin and a minority were Catholic Albanians. In the centuries that followed archival records indicate that they assimilated in the Orthodox majority. Among the Albanians, names whose origin is traced to medieval tribes in the region like the Bukumiri can be found. Slavic anthroponymy in Mrkojevići was frequently followed by the Albanian suffix -za. This phenomenon doesn't appear in such widespread form in any other area of Montenegro except for Crmnica to the north of Mrkojevići. It has been interpreted as the result of gradual, centuries-long adoption of Slavic culture by an Albanian-speaking population, with the Mrkojevići representing a case of an Albanian-speaking population shifting to a Slavic-speaking one.

At the time of the defters compiling (1485), only one household had converted to Islam. Until 1571, the control of the region shifted frequently between Venice and the Ottomans. In the early 17th century the Mrkojevići were still Orthodox. Mariano Bolizza in his 1614 report notes that Marchoeuich has 260 households, 1,000 men-in-arms and is led by Maro Nikov. Settlements that became later part of pravi Mrkojevići are still recorded as separate like Dobra Voda with 100 men-in-arms under Rado Djurov. Gorana is still listed separately with 20 households and 45 men-in-arms under Dumo Luki.

Today, only some families descend from pravi Mrkojevići, while all other brotherhoods and families are descendants of other families or progenitors that settled in the region after fleeing from other areas. The majority of them originate from historic Albanian communities, which after arrival gradually shifted to being Slavic speaking, while a minority descend from Slavic speaking regions, mostly arriving from Old Montenegro.

Of these families: Ivanovići and Lakovići of Dobra Voda came from the Orthodox Slavic-speaking Kuči, Dapčevići came from Cetinje and Rackovići from Lješanska nahija after 1878 when it was annexed by Montenegro. Mujići, Maručići and Morstanovići in Mali Mikulići; Dabovići in Dobra Voda and Markići in Komina came from the Albanian-speaking region of Shestan and the Dibre brotherhood came from the region of Dibra (divided between Albania and Macedonia) around 1840. In Velja Gorana, the Osmanovići where formed in the 1930s when an Albanian from Katërkollë/Vladimir came to Velja Gorana when he married a woman from Vučići brotherhood, who themselves descend from Catholic Albanians who settled there in the late 19th/ early 20th century. The biggest brotherhood in the village, the Kovačevići trace their origin from two distinct families who settled in Velja Gorana in the second half of the 19th century. The first is that of Danila Kovačević, who escaped from a blood feud in the Montenegrin tribal region of Grahovo and settled in Mrkojevići where he became Muslim. The second family is that of Tahirovići who trace their origin to the village of Millë/Mide, in the Albanian geographical region of Ana e Malit in Ulcinj Municipality. In modern times, in Mrkojevići intermarriage takes place with the Slavic Muslim areas of Poda and Tudemili to the north and the Albanian Muslim areas to the south. As a result of different ethnic origins and also intermarriage, part of Mrkojevići is bilingual in Albanian and a local Serbo-Croatian dialect, which shows some influence by the neighbouring Gheg Albanian. This dialect, which retains characteristics of the dialect of Old Montenegro is also influenced by Ottoman Turkish and possibly Venetian. It is mainly spoken by the older generations, while the younger ones mostly speak standard Montenegrin (crnogorski).

After 1878, when Mrkojevići was annexed by Montenegro the Mrkovska kapetanija (the captaincy of Mrkovići) was created as an administrative unit. After 1880, Montenegro incorporated the area of Gorana, which then became administratively part of Mrkojevići.

== Anthropology ==
=== Folk traditions ===
Johann Georg von Hahn recorded one of the first oral traditions about the Mrkojevići from a Catholic priest named Gabriel in Shkodër in 1850. According to it the first direct male ancestor of the Mrkojevići was Merkota Keqi, son of a Catholic Albanian named Keq who, fleeing from the Ottoman conquest, settled in a Slavic-speaking area that would become the historical Piperi region. His sons, the brothers Lazër Keqi (ancestor of Hoti), Ban Keqi (ancestor of Triepshi), Merkota Keqi, Kaster Keqi (ancestor of Krasniqi) and Vas Keqi (ancestor of Vasojevići) had to abandon the village after committing murder against the locals, but Keq and his younger son Piper Keqi remained there and Piper Keqi became the direct ancestor of the Piperi tribe.

=== Dialect ===
In the local Slavic dialect of Mrkojevići, the influence of Albanian is noticeably prevalent. While it is certain that some of the Mrkojevići were historically Albanian, with some still choosing to identify as such, it is likely that both population shifts, in conjunction with bilingualism with surrounding Albanian speakers are responsible for the penetration of Albanian features into the Slavic dialect spoken by the Mrkojevići.

== Population ==
As of 2011, the region has 3,140 inhabitants. Most but not all residents of the communal municipality are part of the Mrkojevići historical tribe. In terms of census records, about half of the communal municipality identifies as ethnic Muslims, about 1/3 as Montenegrins and the rest as Bosniaks, Serbs, Albanians and Muslims-Montenegrins or Montenegrins-Muslims.

Settlement	Montenegrins	Serbs	Bosniaks	Muslims (ethnic group)	Albanians	Muslims-Montenegrins or Montenegrins-Muslims	No response	Others	Total
Dabezići	68	0	0	86	0	0	6	0	160
Dobra Voda	369	62	148	376	28	13	19	19	1046
Grdovići	62	0	0	107	0	0	0	0	175
Kunje	148	50	0	170	0	16	9	12	415
Mala Gorana	39	0	9	75	0	0	6	0	131
Pelinkovići	83	0	0	41	12	0	0	0	141
Pečurice	96	92	72	213	13	1	14	25	573
Velja Gorana	33	0	1	285	17	0	10	0	353
Velje Selo	86	0	6	134	0	0	2	4	233
Total	984	204	236	1487	70	30	68	60	3,140

== Traditions ==
The festival "Dani Mrkojevića" (Days of the Mrkojevići) is held annually in the last week of July, in Pečurice as a celebration of culture and traditions of the area.
