= Nikulitsa =

Greek noble

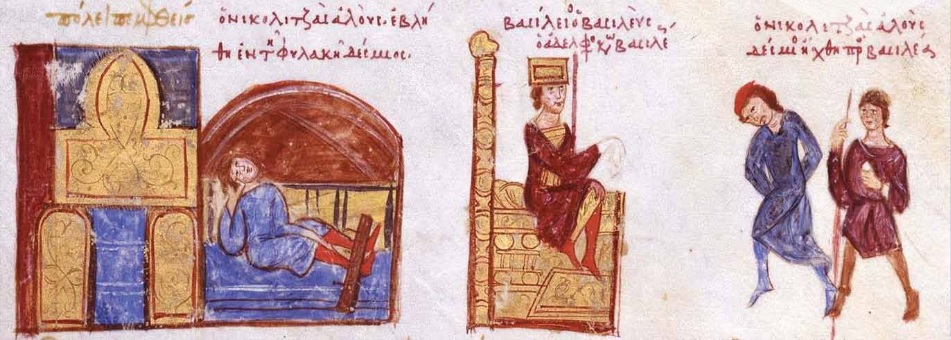
Capture and imprisonment of Nikulitsa by the Byzantines.

Nikulitsa (Bulgarian: Никулица; Greek: Νικουλίτσας) was a noble from Larissa and governor of Servia during the reign of Samuil (r. 997–1014). Nikulitzas belonged to a prominent family in the city. In 980, Emperor Basil II had appointed his grandfather as leader (archon) of the Vlachs; a local ethnic group that was also at the center of the rebellion of 1066–1067. The leaders of that rebellion were all prominent men of Larissa, two of whom are specifically mentioned by Kekaumenos as being Vlachs; Slavota Karmalakis and a certain Beriboes (Berivoi).

== Biography ==
Nikulitsa received his name ("little Nicholas") because of his short height. In 1001, the Byzantines led by Basil II (r. 976–1025) besieged the city of Servia and after a long siege they managed to break through despite the garrison's desperate defence. To secure the fortress, the entire Bulgarian population was deported in the area called Boleron between the rivers Nestos and (Hebros).

Nikulitsa was taken to Constantinople and given the title patrikios. Soon, however, he fled Constantinople and rejoined Samuel's forces, who were trying to take back Servia. Basil II reacted quickly, heading to the town with an army and repulsing the Bulgarians. Samuel and Nikulitsa retreated but soon after the latter was ambushed and captured again. He was taken back to the Byzantine capital where he was imprisoned.

He managed to escape once more and continued to fight. Nikulitsa was among the few nobles who continued the resistance in the mountainous areas of the country after the death of Emperor Ivan Vladislav in 1018. After his troops were surrounded by a Byzantine army, he understood that further resistance was pointless and surrendered to Basil II with the rest of his troops. Basil II sent him in Thessalonica under arrest.

Nikulitsa's grandson, Nikoulitzas Delphinas, led an unsuccessful Vlach (Aromanian) rebellion in Thessaly in 1066. In an effort to defend the political legacy of Nikoulitzas Delphinas – his relative through marriage (συμπέθερος) – Kekaumenos placed the blame entirely on the Vlachs.

== Sources ==
- Curta, Florin (2006). Southeastern Europe in the Middle Ages, 500–1250. Cambridge: Cambridge University Press. ISBN 978-0-521-81539-0.
