= Gorana, Bar =

Gorana Горана
- Village
- Location within Montenegro
- Coordinates: 41.999872°N 19.207709°E
- Country: Montenegro
- Municipality: Bar

Population (2011)
  - Total: 484
- Time zone: UTC+1 (CET)
  - Summer (DST): UTC+2 (CEST)

Gorana (Montenegrin: Горана) is a village in Bar Municipality in Montenegro. The village is located southeast from the town of Bar in the region of Mrkojevići. Gorana has a population of 523 inhabitants according to the 2003 census.

Gorana is a rural farmland that has an elementary school since around year 1905. For further education children of Gorana will have to attend school in Pečurice.

== Demographics ==
Gorana is a sub-region of the Mrkojevići ethno-geographical region and communal municipality of Bar. As of 2011, the demographic composition of the communal municipality is as follows:

| Settlement | Montenegrins | Serbs | Bosniaks | ethnic Muslims | Albanians | Muslims-Montenegrins or Montenegrins-Muslims | No response | Others | Total |
|---|---|---|---|---|---|---|---|---|---|
| Dabezići | 68 | 0 | 0 | 86 | 0 | 0 | 6 | 0 | 160 |
| Dobra Voda | 369 | 62 | 148 | 376 | 28 | 13 | 19 | 19 | 1046 |
| Grdovići | 62 | 0 | 0 | 107 | 0 | 0 | 0 | 0 | 175 |
| Kunje | 148 | 50 | 0 | 170 | 0 | 16 | 9 | 12 | 415 |
| Mala Gorana | 39 | 0 | 9 | 75 | 0 | 0 | 6 | 0 | 131 |
| Pelinkovići | 83 | 0 | 0 | 41 | 12 | 0 | 0 | 0 | 141 |
| Pečurice | 96 | 92 | 72 | 213 | 13 | 1 | 14 | 25 | 573 |
| Velja Gorana | 33 | 0 | 1 | 285 | 17 | 0 | 10 | 0 | 353 |
| Velje Selo | 86 | 0 | 6 | 134 | 0 | 0 | 2 | 4 | 233 |
| Total | 984 | 204 | 236 | 1487 | 70 | 30 | 68 | 60 | 3,140 |
