= Anonymous Zećanin =

Anonymous Zećanin (Serbian: Непознати Зећанин, romanized: Nepoznati Zećanin; fl. 11th century) was a Serbian writer.

== Literary work ==
He was the author of the first original Serbian biography, Žitija svetog Jovana Vladimira [Life of St. Jovan Vladimir], which is preserved only in a Latin excerpt in the Chronicle of the Priest of Duklja (or the so-called Bar genealogy). The author of this biography probably suffered from the influence of the Slavic biographies of Cyril and Methodius, but basically the biography "belongs to the martyrological biography genre with certain specifics of Western European, Latin hagiography".
