= Battle of Morava River =

Battle of Morava
- Part of the Byzantine–Serbian wars
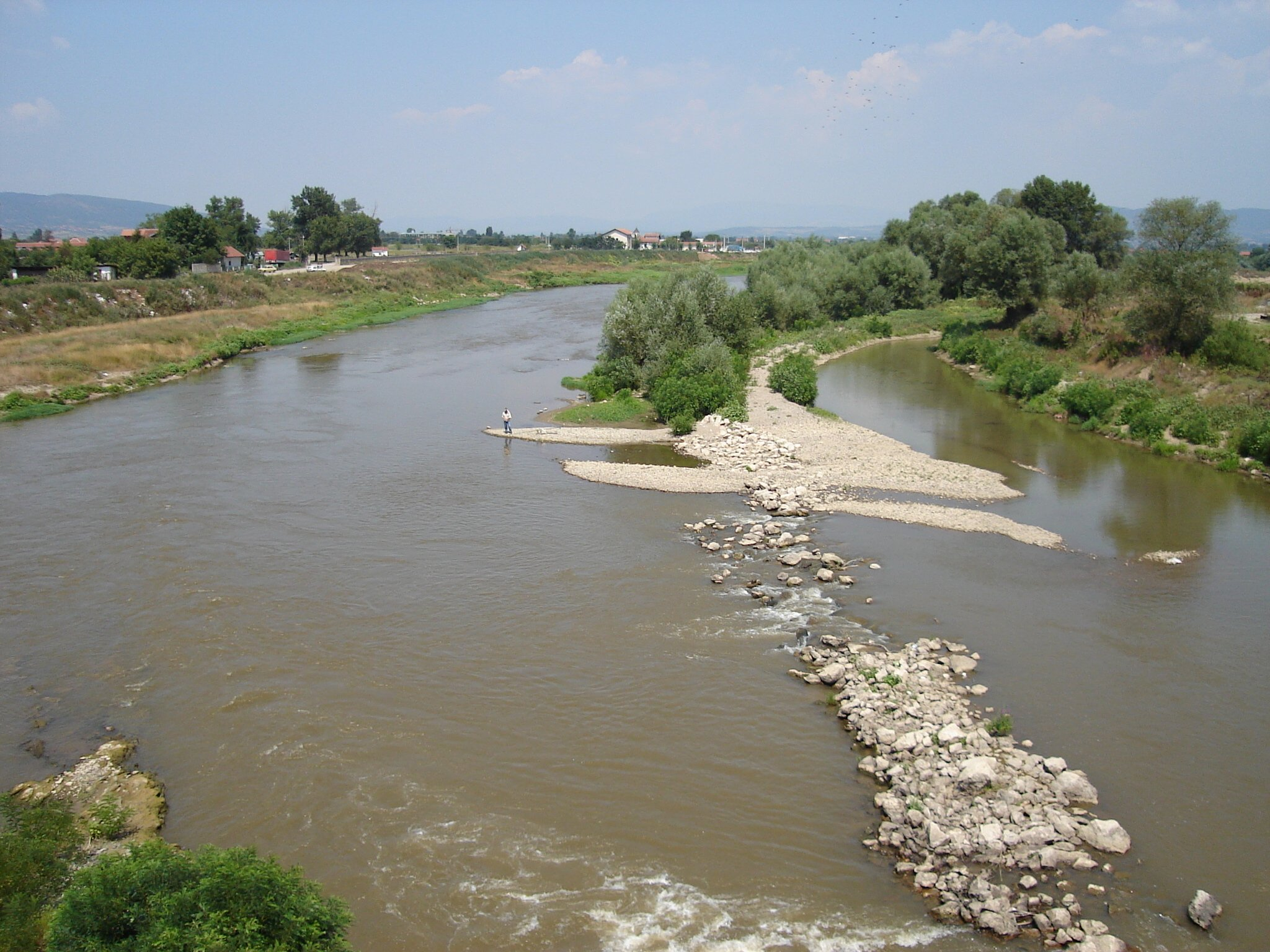
- South Morava near Niš
Date	Autumn 1191
Location	South Morava River
Result	Byzantine victory

Belligerents
Byzantine Empire	Grand Principality of Serbia

Commanders and leaders
Isaac II Angelos	Stefan Nemanja

Strength
Unknown	Unknown

The Battle of Morava River was a military engagement fought between the Byzantine Empire and the Grand Principality of Serbia on a renewed conflict of the Byzantine-Serbian Wars where the battle concluded in a Byzantine victory.

== Background ==
Following the death of Byzantine Emperor Manuel I Komnenos in 1180, the Byzantine Empire fell into a succession crisis, recognizing the empire's internal paralysis, the Grand Župan Stefan Nemanja renounced his allegiance to the Empire and allied with the Hungarians under Béla III of Hungary which sparked the resumption of hostilities lasting between 1183 and 1191. Freed from Byzantine subordination with the help of his Hungarian allies, Nemanja expanded his own territories in Raška, the allied Hungarian and Serbian forces successfully raided as far as Sofia and completely destroyed the city of Niš where he later temporarily made it his capital, the joint campaign critically weakened Byzantine control in the Balkans as of In 1185, Isaac II Angelos ascended the throne following the overthrow and execution of Andronikos I Komnenos by an enraged mob in Constantinople. Too preoccupied with the Norman threat and Bulgarian Uprising in 1185, Isaac was unable to focus on the Serbian aggression, after dealing a defeat to the Normans under Alexios Branas and with the fragile recognition of the Second Bulgarian Empire in 1187–1188, Isaac had to turn his attention to the arrival of the German crusader army in the Balkans under the Holy Roman Emperor Frederick I Barbarossa where Nemanja attempted to ally with Barbarossa in 1189, however the German Emperor politely refused seeking only safe passage for his army through Byzantine lands to reach the Holy land during the ongoing Third Crusade. After an agreement was reached between the two emperors following a hostile conflict, allowed the Crusaders to cross the Dardanelles, however in June 1190, Frederick Barbarossa drowned in a river, allowing Isaac to finally conduct a counter-attack against the Serbs.

== Battle ==
In 1191, Isaac gathered a well prepared-massive army in Constantinople and conducted a Punitive expedition against Nemanja, Isaac met the Nemanja in battle on the South of Morava river where he dealt the Serbs a severe defeat where Nemanja retreated to the mountains, the Byzantines raided the surrounding areas around the bank of the river and even burning down Stefan's Court in Kuršumlija in the process, Nemanja refused to surrender and started an irregular warfare, so the emperor negotiated a final peace treaty.

== Aftermath ==
Following their defeat, Nemanja had to cede a large portion of his gains and recognize the Byzantine Emperor's supreme rule, while the Emperor recognized him as the rightful Grand Župan. Nemanja's son Stefan married the Byzantine Princess Eudokia Angelina and received the title of Sebastokrator. The Principality of Serbia remained as a vassal of the Byzantine empire until 1217–1219. (Note: Even though Serbia was politically independent after 1204, its church infrastructure was still technically under the jurisdiction of the Byzantine Archbishopric of Ohrid)

== Bibliography ==
- Choniates, Niketas (1984) [1207]. O city of Byzantium: Annals of Niketas Choniatēs. Translated by Magoulias, Harry J. Wayne State University Press. ISBN 0814317642. OCLC 10605650.
- Komatina, Ivana (2018). "On the attack of the Hungarian king Bela III on Serbia in light of the letter of emperor Isaac II to pope Celestine III". Facta Universitatis: Philosophy, Sociology, Psychology and History. 17 (2): 105–110. Archived from the original on 1 September 2020.
