= Slavko Mijušković =

Yugoslav historian

Slavko Mijušković (Serbian Cyrillic: Славко Мијушковић, June 28, 1912 – December 15, 1989) was a Yugoslav historian, who studied the history of Montenegro and especially the Bay of Kotor.

== Life ==
Mijušković was born in Kotor. He died in Kotor.

== Work ==
- Kotorska mornarica
- Ustanak u Boki Kotorskoj 1869 : Zbornik radova sa naučnog skupa
- Kulturna baština Balkana i seizmički problemi : radovi sa simpozijuma, Budva 15. i 16. IV 1982.
- Pojava kute u orahovcu 1690 godine i kotorski zdravstveni magistrat.
- Jedan nepoznati dokumenat u vezi proglašenja Petra I za sveca.
- Stav tuđinskih vlasti prema narodnim običajima u Boki Kotorskoj.
- Optužba državnog tužioca u Kotoru od 21 novembra 1921 godine protiv nekoliko istaknutih komunista.
- Turske mjere protiv ulcinjskih gusara
- Borba za srpski jezik u Kotoru za vrijeme austrijske vladavine.
- Osnivanje i djelovanje pomorsko-zdravstvenih ustanova u Boki Kotorskoj.
- Slavko Mijušković (1967). Љетопис попа Дукљанина.

Mijušković stated that the Chronicle of the Priest of Duklja is a purely fictional literary product, belonging to the late 14th or early 15th century.
