= Ljutovid of Zahumlje =

Ljutovid
- Knez of Zahumlje
- Reign: floruit c. 1039–1043
- Religion: Christian

Ljutovid (Serbian Cyrillic: Љутовид) was an independent ruler of Zahumlje. The region of Zahumlje included parts of present-day western Herzegovina in Bosnia and Herzegovina and southern Croatia along the coast. Ljutovid flourished in the middle of the 11th century as a vassal of the Byzantine Empire.

As the local Slavic ruler of Zahumlje, and recipient of Byzantine ranks and titles, he was styled as "protospatharios epi tou Chrysotriklinou, hypatos, strategos of Serbia and Zahumlje" in July 1039, and claimed supremacy in military ranks not only in his local domain but also to the entirety of Serbia. This title was probably given to him by Emperor Michael IV, who might have also granted him nominal right over neighbouring lands, including Serbia.

Depending on different narratives by 11th century John Skylitzes and the 14th century Chronicle of the Priest of Duklja, in 1042, the new emperor ordered Michael the governor of Dyrrhachium to gather a big army, and sent piles of imperial gold and silver to the Župan of Rascia (Serbia), Ban of Bosnia and instructed Ljutovid of Zahumlje to do the same in order to support the overthrow of Stefan Vojislav of Duklja. This was because Vojislav previously denounced the emperor's authority by stealing gold and attacking lands under Byzantine allies. The use of Latin Princeps, rather than Župan or Ban, to describe Ljutovid, supports the notion that he held the supreme authority among the Serbs at the time. In 1043, Michael, or Curcilius and Ljutovid, led the army of the allied forces against Duklja but they were disastrously ambushed in the Triballos mountains (possibly Klobuk hill), with Ljutovid having a duel with Vojislav's son Gojislav. Vojislav went on to pursue and annex the lands of Zahumlje, Travunia and Dyrrhachium.

There exist several documents (possibly forged, but recent research approves their authenticity), one with two variants dated 1039 and 1151, and a third consisting of a transcript by duke Desa. In them, his title as "protospatarius epi to chrusotriclinio, ypatus et strategos Servie et Zachlumie" is confirmed. According to them, Ljutovid awarded the monastery on Lokrum with Babino Polje on the island of Mljet (modern Croatia). According to it, Protospatar Ljutovit declared that no one, neither Ragusan, nor citizen of Ston, neither Latin, nor Slav, could impede the donation.

Political offices
Preceded by Constantine Diogenes	strategos of Serbia and Zahumlje (Byzantine Empire) fl. 1039	Succeeded by Župan; Petrislav I
Preceded by Constantine Diogenes	Prince of Hum (Byzantine Empire) fl. 1042	Succeeded by Župan; Petrislav I
