= Neven Budak =

Croatian historian and professor

- Born: 3 May 1957 (age 68); Zagreb, Croatia
- Occupation: Historian

Academic background
- Thesis: Urbanizacija Varaždinske županije do kraja 16. stoljeća (1991)
- Academic advisor: Nada Klaić

Academic work
- Notable works: Prva stoljeća Hrvatske (1994)

Neven Budak (born 3 May 1957) is a Croatian medievalist and professor at the Faculty of Humanities and Social Sciences, University of Zagreb.

== Biography ==
Neven Budak was born on 3 May 1957 in the city of Zagreb, then part of Socialist Republic of Croatia, SFR Yugoslavia. In the same city Budak finished elementary and high school, as well as graduated in history at the Faculty of Humanities and Social Sciences, University of Zagreb in 1979, and received his doctorate in 1991.

In 1980 began working as an assistant at the Department of Croatian History of the FFZG, to start teaching medieval history from 1983 at the Department of Croatian History of the FFZG, replacing Nada Klaić, and as a full professor since 2002. From 1994 to 2002 he taught urban history at the Central European University in Budapest. In the same time became the Dean of the FFZG (2000–2004). One of the founders of the historical society OTIVM (president 1992-96), since 1999 is the president of the Croatian National Committee for Historical Sciences, and from 2003 Head of the Board of the Croatian History Museum.

== Education policy ==
Between 2009 and 2013, he was a member of the National Board of Higher Education. Prime Minister of the Twelfth Government of the Republic of Croatia, Zoran Milanović, appointed Budak on 16 January 2012 as the Special Adviser to the Prime Minister for Science in the Office of the Prime Minister of the Republic of Croatia. In that position until 2015, he was in charge of drafting and implementing the Education, Science and Technology Strategy (HAZU-MZOS). Under his leadership was created a strategy and project for its implementation known as "Nove boje znanja", for which also edited the same-titled book published in 2015.

== Works ==
His field of historical research initially specialized in topics of urban and social history of the Middle Ages, expanding into the Middle Ages of Slavonia and Dalmatia, formation of ethnic identities among South Slavs, the ethnogenesis of Croats for which organized international scientific conference in 1989, the Early Middle Ages of Croatia, its formation and Christianization.

By 2017, his opus includes seven scientific books as an author and co-author, eight books as an editor and co-editor, two classbooks, two historical-poetical books, 56 chapters in books, 38 scientific papers in journals, 86 professional papers, 50 encyclopedic contributions, as well participation and organization of many scientific conferences and expositions. He also participated as a main advisor of the television series Hrvatski kraljevi (Croatian kings) by HRT.

Author:

- Gradovi Varaždinske županije u srednjem vijeku: urbanizacija Varaždinske županije do kraja 16. stoljeća, Koprivnica: Dr. Feletar (1994)
- Prva stoljeća Hrvatske, Zagreb: Hrvatska sveučilišna naknada (1994)
- Karlo Veliki, Karolinzi i Hrvati, Split: Muzej hrvatskih arheoloških spomenika (2001)
- Habsburzi i Hrvati (with Mario Strecha, Željko Krušelj), Zagreb: Srednja Europa (2003)
- Hrvatska povijest srednjeg vijeka (with Tomislav Raukar), Zagreb: Školska knjiga (2006)
- Što nam se događa?, Zagreb: Srednja Europa (2006)
- Hrvatska i Slavonija u ranome novom vijeku, Zagreb: Leykam International (2007)
- Hrvatski vladari: knezovi, kraljevi, biskupi, Zagreb: V.B.Z. (2013)
- Povijest hrvatskih zemalja u srednjem vijeku: Hrvatska povijest od 550. do 1100., Zagreb: Leykam International (2018)

Editor:

- Etnogeneza Hrvata (Ethnogeny of the Croats), Zagreb: Matica hrvatska, Department of Croatian History of the FFZG (1995)
- Leksikon hrvatskog nacionalnog odbora za povijesne znanosti (with Kristina Milković), Zagreb: FF Press (2004)
- Raukarov zbornik : zbornik u čast Tomislava Raukara, Zagreb: FF Press (2005)
- Croatica: Hrvatski udio u svjetskoj baštini 1 & 2, Zagreb: Profil International (2007)
- Towns and communication, Zagreb: Leykam International (2009)
- Hrvatski nacionalni identitet u globalizirajućem svijetu (with Vjeran Katunarić), Zagreb: Pravni fakultet, Centar za demokraciju i pravo "Miko Tripalo", (2010)
- Hrvatski sabor, Zagreb: Leykam International (2010)
- Istarski sabor (La Dieta istriana), Poreč: Zavičajni muzej Poreštine, Humaniora (2011)

Selected papers and chapters:

- "Obsidio Jadrensis kao povijesno i književno djelo naše rane renesanse" (Obsidio Jadrensis as a historical and literary work of the early Renaissance), Radovi Filozofskog fakulteta u Zadru, vol. 23, pg. 133-138 (1983-1984)
- "Pregled literature i objavljenih izvora o problemu serva i famula u srednjovjekovnim društvima na istočnom Jadranu" (A survey of primary and secondary literature on servi and famuli in the Medieval societies on the eastern Adriatic), Radovi Instituta za hrvatsku povijest, vol. 17, pg. 5-34 (1984)
- "Trgovina radnom snagom na istočnom Jadranu - razvoj i značaj" (The trade with labour force on the eastern Adriatic - development and character), Historijski zbornik, vol. 37, pg. 105-138 (1984)
- "Hrvatska historiografija o srednjem vijeku (do 1527)" (Croatian historiography on the Middle Ages - to 1527), Historijski zbornik, vol. 40, pg. 1-21 (1987)
- "U sukobu s javnim moralom. Primjeri iz seksualnog života Varaždinaca u 16. stoljeću" (In conflict with the public moral - examples from sex life of the citizens of Varaždin in the sixteenth century), Radovi Zavoda za hrvatsku povijest, vol. 21, 121-130 (1988)
- "Ivan od Paližne, prior vranski, vitez reda Sv. Ivana" (John of Paližna, prior of Vrana and knight of the order of St. John), Historijski zbornik, vol. 42, 57-70 (1989)
- "Hrvatska u vrijeme Trpimira" (Croatia in the time of Trpimir), Kaštelanski zbornik, vol. 3, 58-63 (1993)
- "Tumačenje podrijetla i najstarije povijesti Hrvata u djelima srednjovjekovnih pisaca" (The origin and oldest Croatian history in the works of Medieval writers), in Etnogeneza Hrvata, pg. 73-78 (1995)
- "Hrvati između Franaka i Bizanta" (Croats between Franks and Byzantum), Zagreb: Hortus artium medievalium, vol. 3, pg. 15–22 (1997)
- "Hrvatski identitet i ranosrednjovjekovno kraljevstvo" (Croatian Identity and the Early Medieval Kingdom), Historijski zbornik, vol. 52, pg. 122–126 (1999)
- "Hrvatska historiografija o srednjem vijeku" (Croatian Historiography about the Middle Ages), Historijski zbornik, vol. 52, pg. 165–169 (1999)
- "Hrvati između Franaka i Bizanta" (Liturgical memory in Croatia and Dalmatia around the year 1000), Zagreb: Hortus artium medievalium, vol. 6, pg. 135–142 (2000)
- "Slavery in Late Medieval Dalmatia/Croatia: Labour, Legal Status, Integration", Mélanges de l'École française de Rome: Moyen Âge, vol. 112 (2), pg. 745-760 (2000)
- "Slavic ethnogenesies in modern Northern Croatia", in Slovenija in sosednje dežele med antiko in karolinško dobo: Začetki slovenske etnogeneze, Ljubljana, pg. 395-401 (2000)
- "Hrvati u ranom srednjem vijeku" (Croats in the early Middle Ages); "Polaganje temelja Kraljevstva Hrvatske i Dalmacije" (The Foundations of the Kingdom of Croatia and Dalmatia); "Hrvatski društveni razvoj u ranom srednjem vijeku" (Croatian social history in the early Middle Ages), in: Povijest Hrvata, I, Zagreb: Školska knjiga, pg. 49–79, 84-113, 135-144 (2003)
- "Identities in Early Medieval Dalmatia (7th - 11th c.)", in: Franks, Northmen and Slavs: Identities and State Formation in Early Medieval Europe, ed. Ildar H. Garipzanov, Patrick J. Geary, Przemysław Urbańczyk, Turnhout: Brepols, pg. 223-241 (2008)
- "Early medieval boundaries in Dalmatia/Croatia (8th–11th centuries)", Castellum, Civitas, Urbs, Vol. 6, pg. 33–44 (2015)
