= Barbarians in the Byzantine Empire =

In the Byzantine Empire, the term "barbarians" (Greek: βάρβαρος) was used for several non-Greek peoples. The Byzantines regarded most neighbouring people as barbarians. The Bureau of Barbarians was a department of government dealing with matters relating to these "barbarians". In the Early Middle Ages in Europe, the term was applied to Huns, Goths, Pechenegs, Avars, Slavs, Bulgars, and others.

== Sources ==
- Heather, Peter (2010). Empires and Barbarians: Migration, Development and the Birth of Europe. Pan Macmillan. ISBN 978-0-330-54021-6.
- James, Edward (2014). Europe's Barbarians AD 200-600. Routledge. ISBN 978-1-317-86825-5.
- Lawler, Jennifer (2004). Encyclopedia of the Byzantine Empire. McFarland. ISBN 978-1-4766-0929-4.
- Treadgold, Warren (1998). Byzantium and Its Army, 284-1081. Stanford University Press. ISBN 978-0-8047-3163-8.
