= Kekaumenos =

Byzantine author (11th century)

Kekaumenos (Greek: Κεκαυμένος) is the family name of the otherwise unidentified Byzantine author of the Strategikon, a manual on military and household affairs composed c. 1078. He was apparently of Georgian-Armenian origin and the grandson of the doux of Hellas. Despite relevant suppositions, there exists no concrete evidence that he is the famous 11th century general Katakalon Kekaumenos, or his son.

His father-in-law was Nikulitzas Delphinas, a lord of Larissa who took part in the revolt of Vlachs (Aromanians) in Thessaly in 1066. The 11th-century scholar Kekaumenos wrote of a Vlach homeland situated "near the Danube and [...] the Sava, where the Serbians lived more recently". He associated the Vlachs with the Dacians and the Bessi. Kekaumenos referred to the Vlachs as an "unfaithful and undisciplined race". He did this in the archaic style of the time, where he pointed to the Balkan area "Dacia Aureliana" and to Macedonia where the Bessi lived.

== Sources ==
- "Byzantine Siege Warfare in Theory and Practice" by Eric McGeer from The Medieval City under Siege
- Logos Nouthetetikos, or Oration of Admonition to an Emperor by William North
