= Michael (son of Anastasios the logothete) =

Byzantine noble and military leader

Michael (fl. 1042–1058) was a Byzantine patrikios, magistros and doux of the Theme of Dyrrhachium. He was sent in 1042 by Emperor Constantine IX to attack the Serbian rebel Stefan Vojislav, but was defeated. In 1048, he was the doux of Paristrion. George Cedrenus later mentions magistros Michael, patrikios Theodore Chryselios and patrikios Christopher Pyrrhos as supporting Patriarch Michael Keroularios in his dispute with Emperor Isaac I Komnenos (1058). He was the son of logothetes Anastasios.

== Sources ==
- "Μιχαήλ (Michael 114)". Prosopography of the Byzantine World.

Preceded by Basil Synadenos	doux of Dyrrhachium c. 1042	Succeeded by Michael Maurex
Unknown	doux of Paristrion; 1048	Unknown
