= Toparches =

Greek term for district ruler or district

Toparchēs (Greek: τοπάρχης, "place-ruler"), anglicized as toparch, is a Greek term for a governor or ruler of a district and was later applied to the territory where the toparch exercised his authority. In Byzantine times, the term came to be applied to independent or semi-independent rulers in the periphery of the Byzantine world.

== Hellenistic usage ==
The term originates in Hellenistic times, when topos (τόπος, "place, locale") was established as an administrative unit, most notably in the Ptolemaic Kingdom, but also among the Seleucids and Attalids, although less well attested in comparison to Ptolemaic practice. The Ptolemaic topos comprised a number of villages (komai, sing. komē) under a toparchēs and was in turn a subdivision of the nomos (nome or province), which was governed by a strategos. In Ptolemaic Egypt, the toparches was usually an Egyptian, and was responsible for the collection of revenue and administration, much as the nomarchēs for the nomos and the komarchēs for each komē. In an account, the toparchies constituted the hyparchies such as Gaulanitis, Galilea, Samaria, Judea, Perea, and Idumaea during New Testament times. The title remained in use under the Roman Empire in the Greek East, for the governor of a district. Such districts were then called "toparchies" (sing. toparchy, from Greek τοπαρχία, toparchia).

== Byzantine Empire ==
In the 6th century, in the Novellae Constitutiones of Emperor Justinian I, the term toparchēs was used to encompass all local magistrates, both civilian and military.

More often, however, Byzantine writers use the term to refer to local monarchs, especially during the 10th–13th centuries, when, according to the Byzantinist Paul Lemerle, "a toparchēs is the independent ruler of a foreign territory adjoining the Empire... He is in some manner under the influence of the Empire, as it is supposed that he may rebel against the Byzantines". This usage extended not only to actual breakaway or de facto autonomous Byzantine governors, who appear during the military crises and administrative disintegration of the 11th–12th centuries, but was also applied to independent rulers, usually on the periphery of the Byzantine Empire (e.g. the Emir of Crete, various Turkish lords in Anatolia, or the rulers of Bulgaria or Serbia), of territories which the Byzantines considered rightfully theirs.

In this context, the late 11th-century writer Kekaumenos dedicates a large part of his Strategikon to advising the toparchēs on his conduct and dealings with the emperor and the other Byzantine governors.
