= Strategikon of Kekaumenos =

11th century Byzantine manual

The Strategikon of Kekaumenos (Greek: Στρατηγικὸν τοῦ Κεκαυμένου, Latin: Cecaumeni Strategicon) is a late 11th century Byzantine manual offering advice on warfare and the handling of public and domestic affairs.

The book was composed between 1075 and 1078 by a Byzantine general of partly Armenian descent. In it, he offers advice, based on his own personal experience and drawing upon numerous historical examples from the events of the 11th century. It is divided in six parts:

- Part 1 (Chapters 1-8) survives incomplete, as its beginning has been lost. It concerns the duties and services due to a superior lord.
- Part 2 (Chapters 9-34) is the Strategikon proper, and contains advice to a general.
- Part 3 (Chapters 35-71) contains advice on domestic matters, the rearing of children, management of the house and the family and social relations.
- Part 4 (Chapters 72-76) contains advice on the proper course of action in the event of a revolt against the Emperor.
- Part 5 (Chapters 77-88) contains the admonitions to the Emperor on the governance and defence of the state.
- Part 6 (Chapters 89-91) contains advice to the autonomous local ruler (toparchēs) on his dealings with the Emperor.

The book is valuable to historians for its portrayal of the mindset of the Byzantine provincial aristocracy in the closing decades of the 11th century, and especially the social relations, as revealed in the third part. It also contains much otherwise unknown information about historical events.

== Editions, Translations, and Commentaries ==
- Maria Dora Spadaro, ed. and transl., Kekaumenos. Raccomandazioni e consigli di un galantuomo: Stratēgikon. Alessandria 1998 (Greek text with facing Italian translation).
- Dimitris Tsougarakis, ed., comm., and transl. Κεκαυμένου Στρατηγικόν. Athens 1993 (3rd ed. 1996) (Greek text with Modern Greek translation).
- Paolo Odorico, Kekaumenos. Conseils et récits d'un gentilhomme byzantin, Toulouse, Anacharsis, 2015. ISBN 9791092011173
- Hans-Georg Beck, Vademecum des Byzantinischen Aristokraten, Graz/Vienna/Cologne, Verlag Styria, 1956 (German translation)
