= Chronicle of the Priest of Duklja =

Anonymous medieval chronicle

- Author: An anonymous priest in Duklja (presbyter Diocleas)
- Language: Latin
- Subject: history, hagiography
- Publication date: 1510 (Marulić); 1601 (Orbini)
- Publication place: Republic of Venice; Republic of Ragusa; Kingdom of Serbia

The Chronicle of the Priest of Dioclea or Duklja or Gesta regum Sclavorum are names given to a medieval chronicle, or rather gesta ("deeds"), written in two versions between 1295 and 1301 by an ecclesiastic from Duklja, recently identified as archbishop Rudger of Bar. Its oldest preserved copy is in Latin from the 17th century, and modern historians have debated the text's date of composition (mid-12th to late 16th century) and authenticity.

The work recounts the history of Dalmatia and nearby regions from the 5th to the mid-12th century, and contains semi-mythical material on the early history of the Western South Slavs. The section "Life of St. Jovan Vladimir", is believed to be one of the local traditions integrated into the narrative.

== Authorship and date ==
The work was traditionally ascribed to an anonymous "priest of Duklja" (presbyter Diocleas, Serbo-Croatian: pop Dukljanin), and historiography tended to ascribe him a local Slavic identity. The work is preserved only in its Latin redactions from a 17th-century printing. Mavro Orbin, a Ragusan historian, included the work (amongst other works) in his Il regno de gli Slavi (ca. 1601); Johannes Lucius did the same in ca. 1666.

Serbian historian Tibor Živković, in his monograph Gesta regum Sclavorum (2009), concluded that its main parts are dated to c. 1295–1301. The chronicle, written in Latin, was completed in two versions between 1295 and 1301 in the towns of Split, then part of the Kingdom of Croatia in personal union with Hungary, and Bar (in Montenegro), then part of the Serbian Kingdom. Its author was presbyter Rudger (or Rüdiger), the Catholic archbishop of Bar (Antivari), who was probably of Czech origin. He is thought to have written around 1300 because Bosnian borders are referred to in a way that coincides with an anonymous text, the Anonymi Descriptio Europae Orientalis, that has been dated to the year 1308. Rudger became archbishop of Bar in 1298, but was expelled from the town in 1301 by order of the Serbian king Stefan Milutin; Rudger died at the monastery of Zwettl, in Austria, on 8 December 1305. On the basis of its content, Rudger's composition is believed to have been heavily influenced by his knowledge of medieval Latin sources, from Isidore of Seville and Jordanes to Peter Abelard and Geoffrey of Monmouth, and Bohemian and Polish historical works. The themes and scope of Rudger's work are supposed to have been shaped by the political interests and priorities of his patron, Paul I Šubić of Bribir, ban of Croatia and lord of Bosnia.

Chapters 1–33 of the chronicle are based on oral traditions and its author's constructions; these are largely dismissed by historians. Despite its hagiographic nature, chapter 36 (on Saint Jovan Vladimir), a summary of an older hagiography dating between 1075 and 1089 (when the Vojislavljević dynasty endeavored to obtain the royal insignia from the Pope, and to elevate the Bar bishopric to an archbishopric), contains considerable historical data that has been found to be reliable. Chapters 34 and 35, which deal with Vladimir's father and uncles, are likely based on the prologue of this 11th-century hagiography.

Still today, some Croatian historians uncritically claim that the work dates to the 12th century, as per the outdated views. In 1996, Croatian historian Franjo Šanjek put forward the theory that the anonymous author was Bishop Gregory of Bar, who lived in the second half of the 12th century. Montenegrin literary historian Vojislav Nikčević (in 2002) attributed the same claim to the work of the Croatian church historian Eduard Peričić from 1991. The bishopric of Bar was defunct at that time. In his 1967 reprint of the work, Yugoslav historian Slavko Mijušković said that the chronicle is a purely fictional literary product, belonging to the late 14th or early 15th century.

== Content ==
=== Redactions and versions ===
The original lost work had no chapters. The original author compiled a shorter Latin work (LR), and then compiled a wider work of Gesta regum Sclavorum (GRS) which included the shorter work with certain changes. The GRS had an introduction by the author, which is not found in the HR. The shorter LR became the Croatian redaction (HR). The first organizers of GRS, Johannes Lucius and Mavro Orbin, did not use chapters, and the text was in continuous form. The next publisher of GRS, G. Schwandtner in Presbyteri Diocleatis Regnum Slavorum (1748) divided the text into 42 chapters, and he used Lucius' work and at least one manuscript of the GRS, as well as included Marko Marulić's Latin translation (HL) of the HR.

- Latin redaction (Serbo-Croatian: Latinska redakcija, LR), first redaction, original Gesta regum Sclavorum (GRS). Survived in two Latin manuscripts, the Belgrade and Vatican manuscripts, both most likely copies of vicar bishop Pasquali's manuscript (which has not survived). The original did not have a title and the manuscripts were given suitable titles by their copyists. Ludovicus Tubero (1459–1527) found a manuscript of the GRS in 1508 in Hungary which he brought to Dubrovnik and described, and used parts of in his Commentarii on few pages.
  - Belgrade Manuscript (Serbo-Croatian: Beogradski rukopis, indexed as "R–570"), dated to 1648/1649, held in the National Library of Serbia in Belgrade, in Latin. GRS is on folia 1–30v, under the title Deocleanvs in vitis Regvm Dalmatiae et Croatiae, and is continued by the Latin translation of the Croatian Redaction, by Marko Marulić, on folia 36 do 47v, under the title Regvm Dalmatiae et Croatiae Historia vna cum Salonarvm desolatione. As the Vatican Manuscript, it is a copy of vicar bishop Pasquali's template.
  - Vatican Manuscript (Serbo-Croatian: Vatikanski rukopis, indexed as "Codex Vat. Lat. 6958"), dated to c. 1650, held in the Vatican Library, in Latin. GRS is on folia 53–75, and is continued by the Latin translation of the Croatian Redaction, by Marko Marulić.
    - Presbyteri Diocleatis Regnum Sclavorum, in De regno Dalmatiae et Croatiae libri sex (1666) pages 287–302, of Johannes Lucius (but not written by him), in Latin, copy of Latin redaction (GRS). Lucius used a manuscript in the possession of Rafael Levaković, which the latter mentioned having found in Kotor in 1648, which he named Historia de Re di Dalmatia, lent to him by vicar bishop Pasquali. Pasquali's template was written in Risan, possibly from a manuscript from Dubrovnik. On pages 303–311 were included Marko Marulić's Latin translation of the Croatian redaction, Marci Maruli patritii Spalatensis Regum Dalmatiae et Croatiae gesta. Lucius did not use Orbin's Italian edition.
  - Italian translation of the Latin redaction (Serbo-Croatian: Italijanska redakcija), found in Mavro Orbin's Il regno de gli Slavi (1601) on pages 205–239, with the title La storia de’ rè di Dalmatia et altri luoghi vicini dell’ Illirico. Orbin used at least three Latin manuscripts of GRS, at least one Slavic manuscript of GRS, and also Marulić's translation (HL) and Kaletić's transcript of the Croatian Redaction (HR). His usage of HL and HR is noted with the term "others say", meaning he did not hold the GRS and the HL/HR of identical status. One of the Latin manuscripts was that of Tubero. Orbin was the one who brought the HR and HL to Dubrovnik.
- Croatian Redaction (Hrvatska redakcija, HR), dated to 1450 at earliest.
  - Papalić's transcript (1500), of Dmine Papalić, in Slavic, has not survived. Found by Papalić in Poljice. A copy was given to Papalić's relative Marko Marulić.
    - Kaletić's transcript (1546), a copy of Papalić's transcript by Jerolim Kaletić, in Slavic. Kaletić's is the oldest survived text of the Croatian Redaction.
    - Regnum Dalmatiae et Croatiae gesta (1510), of Marko Marulić of Split, in Latin. Also technically known as "Marulić's Latin translation" (Marulićev latinski prevod, HL). Translation of Croatian redaction, included in Johannes Lucius' De regno Dalmatiae et Croatiae libri sex (1666) as Marci Maruli patritii Spalatensis Regum Dalmatiae et Croatiae gesta on pages 303–311. Included in G. Schwandtner's Presbyteri Diocleatis Regnum Slavorum (1748) on pages 510–524, after the GRS on pages 474–509. Marulić's Latin translation has survived in five manuscripts held at Venice (two), Milano, Padua and Vatican.

Croatian historian Ivan Kukuljević Sakcinski (1816–1889) published the Croatian redaction (HR) in 1851, with a short introduction. Catholic clergyman and Slavist Ivan Črnčić (1830–1897) published both GRS and HR in 1874, with a useful and thorough introduction. Instead of using Schwandtner's 42 chapters, Črnčić divided it into 47 chapters, which was adopted and is still used in historiography. Croatian historian Ferdo Šišić (1869–1940) published Letopis popa Dukljanina in 1928, including the text from the Vatican Manuscript, Orbin's Italian translation, Croatian text of Kaletić's transcript and Marulić's Latin translation; this was the widest compilation at the time, and it increased interest in the work. Šišić unfortunately edited the Latin text instead of writing notes, and this contaminated the original work and entered the literature; he sought to prove that HR originated in the GRS and his approach is against methodological rules, making his publication unusable in serious scholarly study. Russian–Yugoslav historian Vladimir Mošin (1894–1987) published the Latin and Croatian redaction with Serbo-Croatian translation in Ljetopis popa Dukljanina (1950), with a short study in the introduction, and this was a clearer and more practical work than Šišić's, and he also used a better Latin source. Until 1962, the Vatican Manuscript of the GRS was the only known until the finding of the Belgrade Manuscript.

=== Chapters and sections ===
The work is divided into 47 chapters, as per Črnčić's 1874 work. It can be divided into sections, such as:

- Introduction (Auctor ad lectorem)
- Libellus Gothorum, chapters I–VII
- Constantine's Legend (or "Pannonian Legend"), chapters VIII and beginning of IX
- Methodius (Liber sclavorum qui dicitur Methodius), rest of chapter IX
- Travunian Chronicle, chapters X–XXXV, in two parts
- The Life of St. Jovan Vladimir, chapter XXXVI
- History of Dioclea, chapters XXXVII–LXVII

The author attempted to present an overview of ruling families over the course of over two centuries — from the 10th century up to the time of writing, the 12th century. There are 47 chapters in the text, of different sizes and varying subject matter.

== Folklore and translations ==
Among the material he translated, rather than created, is "The Legend of Prince Vladimir" which is supposed to have been written by another clergyman, also from Duklja, more specifically, Zećanin from Krajina in Zeta or Duklja (an earlier name for Zeta). In its original version, it was a hagiographic work, a "Life of St. Vladimir" rather than a "Legend." Prince Vladimir, the protagonist of the story, as well as Emperor Ivan Vladislav of Bulgaria, who ordered Vladimir's execution, were historical persons, yet "The Legend of Prince Vladimir" is believed to contain non-historical material.

In 1986, the chronicle was translated from the Croatian into Ukrainian by Antin V. Iwachniuk. The translation was financed by the Iwachniuk Ukrainian Studies and Research Fund at the University of Ottawa.

== Assessment ==
=== Historical value, fiction ===
Various inaccurate or simply wrong claims in the text make it an unreliable source. Modern historians have serious doubts about the majority of this work as being mainly fictional, or wishful thinking. Some go as far as to say that it can be dismissed in its entirety, but that is not a majority opinion, rather, it is thought to have given us a unique insight into the whole era from the point of view of the indigenous Slavic population and it is still a topic of discussion.

The work describes the local Slavs as a peaceful people imported by the Goth rulers, who invaded the area in the 5th century, but it doesn't attempt to elaborate on how and when this happened. This information contradicts the information found in the Byzantine text De Administrando Imperio.

The Chronicle also mentions one Svetopeleg or Svetopelek, the eighth descendant of the original Goth invaders, as the main ruler of the lands that cover Croatia, Bosnia and Herzegovina, Montenegro (Duklja) and Serbia. He is also credited with the Christianization of the people who are Goths or Slavs — a purely fictitious attribution. These claims about a unified kingdom are probably a reflection of the earlier glory of the Moravian kingdom. He may also have been talking about Avars.

The priest's parish was located at the seat of the archbishopric of Duklja. According to Bishop Gregory's late 12th-century additions to this document, this Archbishopric covered much of the western Balkans including the bishoprics of Bar, Budva, Kotor, Ulcinj, Svač, Skadar, Drivast, Pulat, Travunia, Zahumlje.

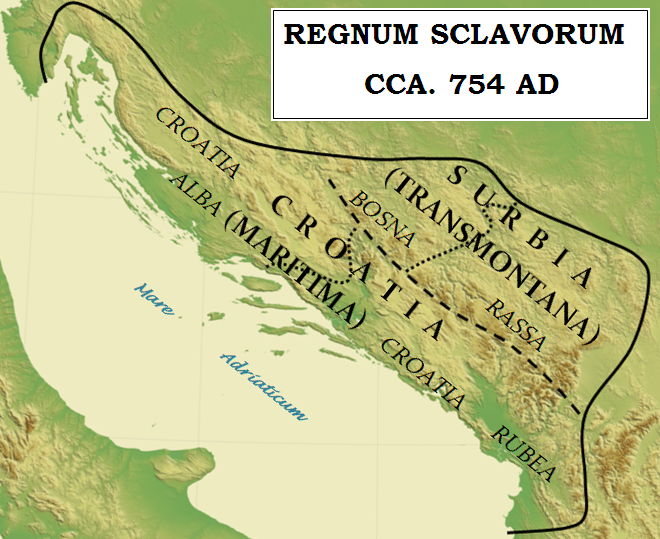
Map of fictituous Slavic kingdom of king Svetopelek in the Western Balkans as it has been described in the chronicle Chronicle of the Priest of Duklja.

Further, it mentions Bosnia (Bosnam) and Rascia (Rassa) as the two lands of Transmontana/Surbia, while describing the southern Dalmatian Hum/Zahumlje, Travunia and Dioclea (most of today's Herzegovina, Montenegro, as well as parts of Croatia and Albania) as Maritima/Croatian lands of Red Croatia while other Dalmatian-Lika lands as White Croatia, which is a description inconsistent with other historical works from the same period, but not all.

The archbishop of Bar was later named Primas Serbiae. Ragusa had some claims to be considered the natural ecclesiastical centre of South Dalmatia but those of Dioclea (Bar) to this new metropolitan status were now vigorously pushed especially as the Pope intended Serbia to be attached to Dioclea.

In his 1967 reprint of the work, Yugoslav historian Slavko Mijušković stated that the chronicle is a purely fictional literary product, belonging to the late 14th or early 15th century.

=== Region of Bosnia ===
The region of Bosnia is described to span the area west of the river Drina, "up to the Pine mountain" (Latin: ad montem Pini, Croatian: do gore Borave). The location of this Pine mountain is unknown. In 1881, Croatian historian Franjo Rački wrote that this refers to the mountain of "Borova glava" near the Livno field. Croatian historian Luka Jelić wrote the mountain was located either between Maglaj and Skender Vakuf, northwest of Žepče, or it was the mountain Borovina located between Vranica and Radovna, according to Ferdo Šišić's 1908 work. In 1935, Serbian historian Vladimir Ćorović wrote that the toponym refers to the mountain of Borova glava, because of etymology and because it is located on the watershed (drainage divide). In 1936, Slovene ethnologist Niko Županič had also interpreted that to mean that the western border of Bosnia was at some drainage divide mountains, but placed it to the southeast of Dinara. Croatian historian Anto Babić, based on the work of Dominik Mandić in 1978, inferred that the term refers roughly to a place of the drainage divide between the Sava and Adriatic Sea watersheds. In her discussion of Ćorović, Serbian historian Jelena Mrgić-Radojčić also points to the existence of a mountain of "Borja" in today's northern Bosnia with the same etymology.

== Annotations ==
1. The work Gesta regum Sclavorum (name in Latin), is known in Serbo-Croatian historiography as the "Chronicle of the Priest of Dioclea or Duklja" (Serbian: Летопис попа Дукљанина/Letopis popa Dukljanina, Croatian: Ljetopis popa Dukljanina, LPD, LJPD or LjPD), and "Bar Geneaology" (Barski rodoslov). The use of "chronicle" and "geneaology" is technically false, as the work does not have characteristics of a chronicle. The work is more appropriate as a gesta regum ("deeds of kings"), which the original author also explains is the purpose, in the introduction.

== Sources ==
Commentaries

- Mijušković, Slavko (1988) [1967]. Љетопис попа Дукљанина. Prosveta.
- Šišić, Ferdo, ed. (1928). Летопис попа Дукљанина [Chronicle of the Priest of Duklja]. Srpska kraljevska akademija.
- Kunčer, Dragana (2009). Gesta Regum Sclavorum. Vol. 1. Beograd-Nikšić: Istorijski institut, Manastir Ostrog.
- Živković, Tibor (2009). Gesta Regum Sclavorum. Vol. 2. Beograd-Nikšić: Istorijski institut, Manastir Ostrog.

== Bibliography ==
- Banašević, Nikola (1971). Летопис попа Дукљанина и народна предања (PDF). Српска књижевна задруга.
- Bujan, Solange (2008). "La Chronique du prêtre de Dioclée. Un faux document historique". Revue des études byzantines. 66 (1): 5–38.
- Homza, Martin (2021). "Is chapter IX of the Chronicle of the Priest of Dioclea of Moravian-Pannonian origin?". Studia Slavica et Balcanica Petropolitana (2 (30)). Saint Petersburg State University: 79–104. doi:10.21638/spbu19.2021.206. ISSN 1995-848X.
- Komatina, Predrag (2025). "Мавро Орбин, Иван Лучић и Летопис попа Дукљанина" [Mauro Orbini, Joannes Lucius and the Chronicle of the Priest of Dioclea]. Иницијал [Initial]. 13: 185–231.
- Komatina, Predrag (2020). "Quis Ergo Presbyter Diocleas? Рана дубровачка историографија и Летопис попа Дукљанина". Историјски часопис. 69: 189–226.
- Mrgić-Radojčić, Jelena (2004). "Rethinking the Territorial Development of the Medieval Bosnian State". Istorijski časopis. 51: 43–64.
- Orbini, Mauro (1601). Il Regno de gli Slavi hoggi corrottamente detti Schiavoni (in Italian). Pesaro: Apresso Girolamo Concordia.
- Orbin, Mavro (1968). Kraljevstvo Slovena (in Serbian). Beograd: Srpska književna zadruga.
- Živković, Tibor (2000). Sloveni i Romeji: Slavizacija na prostoru Srbije od VII do XI veka [The Slavs and the Romans: Slavicization in the area of Serbia between VII and XI century] (in Serbian). Beograd: Istorijski institut SANU, Službeni glasnik. ISBN 9788677430221.
- Živković, Tibor (2002). Južni Sloveni pod vizantijskom vlašću 600-1025 [South Slavs under the Byzantine Rule 600-1025] (in Serbian). Beograd: Istorijski institut SANU, Službeni glasnik. ISBN 9788677430276.
- Živković, Tibor (2006). Portreti srpskih vladara: IX-XII vek [Portraits of Serbian Rulers: IX-XII Century] (in Serbian). Beograd: Zavod za udžbenike i nastavna sredstva. ISBN 9788617137548.
- Živković, Tibor (2008). Forging unity: The South Slavs between East and West 550-1150. Belgrade: The Institute of History, Čigoja štampa. ISBN 9788675585732.
- Živković, Tibor (2010). "On the Beginnings of Bosnia in the Middle Ages". Spomenica akademika Marka Šunjića (1927-1998). Sarajevo: Filozofski fakultet. pp. 161–180.
