= List of settlements in the Serres regional unit =

This is a list of settlements in the Serres regional unit, Greece:

- Achinos
- Achladochori
- Adelfiko
- Agia Eleni
- Agia Paraskevi
- Agio Pnevma
- Agiochori
- Agios Christoforos
- Agios Dimitrios
- Agkistro
- Agriani
- Aidonochori
- Akritochori
- Alistrati
- Amfipoli
- Ammoudia
- Ampeli
- Anagennisi
- Anastasia
- Anatoli
- Angista
- Ano Kamila
- Ano Poroia
- Ano Vrontou
- Anthi
- Charopo
- Cheimarros
- Chionochori
- Chortero
- Choumniko
- Christos
- Chryso
- Chrysochorafa
- Dafni
- Dafnoudi
- Dasochori
- Dimitra
- Dimitritsi
- Domiros
- Draviskos
- Efkarpia
- Elaionas, Serres
- Emmanouil Papas
- Eptamyloi
- Flampouro
- Gazoros
- Gefyroudi
- Gonimo
- Iliokomi
- Irakleia
- Ivira
- Kala Dendra
- Kalochori
- Kalokastro
- Kamaroto
- Kapnofyto
- Karperi
- Kastanochori
- Kastanoussa
- Kato Kamila
- Kato Mitrousi
- Kato Poroia
- Kerkini
- Koimisi
- Konstantinato
- Kormista
- Koumaria
- Kouvouklio
- Krinida
- Lefkonas
- Lefkothea
- Lefkotopos
- Limnochori
- Lithotopos
- Livadia
- Livadochori
- Lygaria
- Makrinitsa
- Mandili
- Mandraki
- Mavrolofos
- Mavrothalassa
- Megalochori
- Melenikitsi
- Mesada
- Mesokomi
- Mesolakkia
- Mesorrachi
- Metalla, Serres
- Mikro Souli
- Mitrousi
- Monokklisia
- Monovrysi
- Myrkinos
- Myrini
- Nea Bafra
- Nea Kerdylia
- Nea Petra
- Nea Tyroloi
- Nea Zichni
- Neo Petritsi
- Neo Souli
- Neochori Kerkinis
- Neochori Strymona
- Neos Skopos
- Nigrita
- Nikokleia
- Oinoussa
- Oreini
- Oreskeia
- Palaiokastro
- Palaiokomi
- Paralimni
- Pentapoli
- Peponia
- Pethelinos
- Platanakia
- Pontismeno
- Promachonas
- Proti
- Provatas
- Psychiko
- Rodolivos
- Rodopoli
- Serres
- Sfelinos
- Sidirokastro
- Sisamia
- Sitochori
- Skopia
- Skotoussa
- Skoutari
- Stathmos Angistis
- Stavrodromi
- Strymoniko
- Strymonochori
- Symvoli
- Terpni
- Theodorio
- Therma
- Tholos
- Toumpa
- Tragilos
- Triada
- Triantafyllia
- Valtero
- Valtotopi
- Vamvakia
- Vamvakofyto
- Vamvakoussa
- Variko
- Vergi
- Vyroneia
- Zervochori
- Zevgolatio

== See also ==
- List of towns and villages in Greece
