= Symvoli =

Symvoli Συμβολή
- Community
- Location within Greece
- Coordinates: 41°1.7′N 24°2.5′E
- Country: Greece
- Administrative region: Central Macedonia
- Regional unit: Serres
- Municipality: Amphipolis
- Municipal unit: Kormista

Population (2021)
  - Community: 160
- Time zone: UTC+2 (EET)
  - Summer (DST): UTC+3 (EEST)
- Postal code: 620 56
- Area code: 23240
- Vehicle registration: ΕΡ

Symvoli (Greek: Συμβολή, before 1927: Μπάνιτσα - Banitsa, is a village in the eastern part of the municipal unit of Kormista in the Serres regional unit, Macedonia, Greece. It is located on the left bank of the river Angitis, in the easternmost part of the regional unit, near the regional unit of Drama. The community includes the settlement Ano Symvoli.

== Historical population ==
Historical population
Year	Pop.	±%
1981	404	—
1991	262	−35.1%
2001	462	+76.3%
2011	275	−40.5%
2021	160	−41.8%

== See also ==
- List of settlements in the Serres regional unit
