= Myrkinos, Serres =

Village in Serres, Greece

Coordinates: 40°54′N 23°49′E

Myrkinos (Greek: Μύρκινος) is a village in Serres regional unit of Central Macedonia, located at the confluence of the rivers Strymonas and Angitis. Since the 2011 administrative reform it has been a municipal unit of the municipality of Nea Zichni. It has a population of 370 inhabitants and until 1928 was named “Doxombos”.

== History ==
Myrkinos was a remarkable Thracian city, the capital of Edoni (from the 8th to the 5th century BC), whose place is identical to the present village of the same name, where archaeological findings testify to the existence of an ancient city. As evidenced by Appianos and Diodorus, as well as by finding three inscriptions, Myrkinos survived to the Roman (imperial) times. In Byzantine times it was referred to by its name “Doxobus”.
