= Konstantinos Tarasis =

Greek footballer

Personal information
- Full name: Konstantinos Tarasis
- Date of birth: 10 November 1957 (age 68)
- Place of birth: Serres
- Height: 1.75 m (5 ft 9 in)
- Position: Defender

Senior career*
Years	Team	Apps	(Gls)
1975–1982	Panserraikos	128	(2)
1983–1987	Panathinaikos	93	(2)
1987–1988	Aris	11	(0)
1988–1989	Messolonghi		

International career
1982–1984	Greece	4	(0)

Managerial career
- 1996–1997: Panserraikos
- 2006–2009: Panathinaikos U20
- 2009–2020: Panathinaikos U20 (assistant)
- * Club domestic league appearances and goals

Konstantinos Tarasis (Greek: Kωνσταντίνος Tαράσης; born 10 November 1957) is a retired Greek football defender and later manager.

== Personal ==
Tarasis hails from Oinoussa, Serres.

His daughter Mary (1980–2022) was a handball player and coach. She died by cancer on 6 November 2022.
