= Aidonochori, Serres =

Aidonochori Αηδονοχώρι
- Community
- Location within Greece
- Coordinates: 40°50′33″N 23°43′41″E
- Country: Greece
- Administrative region: Central Macedonia
- Regional unit: Serres
- Municipality: Visaltia
- Elevation: 200 m (660 ft)

Population (2021)
  - Community: 197
- Time zone: UTC+2 (EET)
  - Summer (DST): UTC+3 (EEST)
- Area code: 2322
- Vehicle registration: ΕΡ

Aidonochori (Greek: Αηδονοχώρι) is a village in the region of Serres, northern Greece. It belonged to the municipality of Tragilos until 2011, when the application of the Kallikratis Plan incorporated the entire municipality to the municipality of Visaltia. According to the 2021 Greek census, the village had 197 inhabitants.

== History ==
According to the statistics of the Bulgarian geographer Vasil Kanchov, the village had 1,500 Christian Greek inhabitants in 1900. The village was an autonomous community from 1920 until 1997, when it became part of the municipality of Tragilos. The singer Giannis Aggelakas is origined from the village.
