= Agia Paraskevi (disambiguation) =

Agia Paraskevi is a suburb of Athens, Greece. It may also refer to:

- Agia Paraskevi, Aetolia-Acarnania, a village in the municipality Agrinio, Aetolia-Acarnania regional unit, Greece
- Agia Paraskevi, Arta, a village in the municipality Nikolaos Skoufas, Arta regional unit, Greece
- Agia Paraskevi, Chalkidiki, a village in Chalkidiki, Greece
- Agia Paraskevi, Drama, a village in the municipality Doxato, Drama regional unit, Greece
- Agia Paraskevi, Florina, a village in the Florina regional unit, Greece
- Agia Paraskevi, Ioannina, a village in the municipality Konitsa, Ioannina regional unit, Greece
- Agia Paraskevi, Karditsa, a village in the municipality Sofades, Karditsa regional unit, Greece
- Agia Paraskevi, Kilkis, a village in the municipality Kilkis, Kilkis regional unit, Greece
- Agia Paraskevi, Kozani, a municipal unit in the Kozani regional unit, Greece
- Agia Paraskevi, Lesbos, a village in the island of Lesbos, Greece
- Agia Paraskevi, Lamia, a village in the municipality Lamia, Phthiotis, Greece
- Agia Paraskevi, Tithorea, a village in the municipality Amfikleia-Elateia, Phthiotis, Greece
- Agia Paraskevi, Rethymno, a village in the municipality Amari, Rethymno regional unit, Greece
- Agia Paraskevi, Serres, a village in the municipality Visaltia, Serres regional unit, Greece
- Agia Paraskevi, Thessaloniki, a village in the municipality Thermi, Thessaloniki regional unit, Greece
- Agia Paraskevi, Aspropotamos, a village in the Meteora municipality, Trikala regional unit, Greece
- Agia Paraskevi, Nicosia District, Cyprus, a suburb of Nicosia, archaeologically noted for a Bronze Age necropolis
- Agia Paraskevi (Yeroskipou), a Byzantine church in Yeroskipou, Cyprus
- Agia Paraskevi (Kato Akourdhalia), a Byzantine church in Kato Akourdhalia, Cyprus
- Paraskevi of Rome, a saint (agia) recognised by the Orthodox Church
