= Pethelinos =

Pethelinos Πεθελινός
- Community
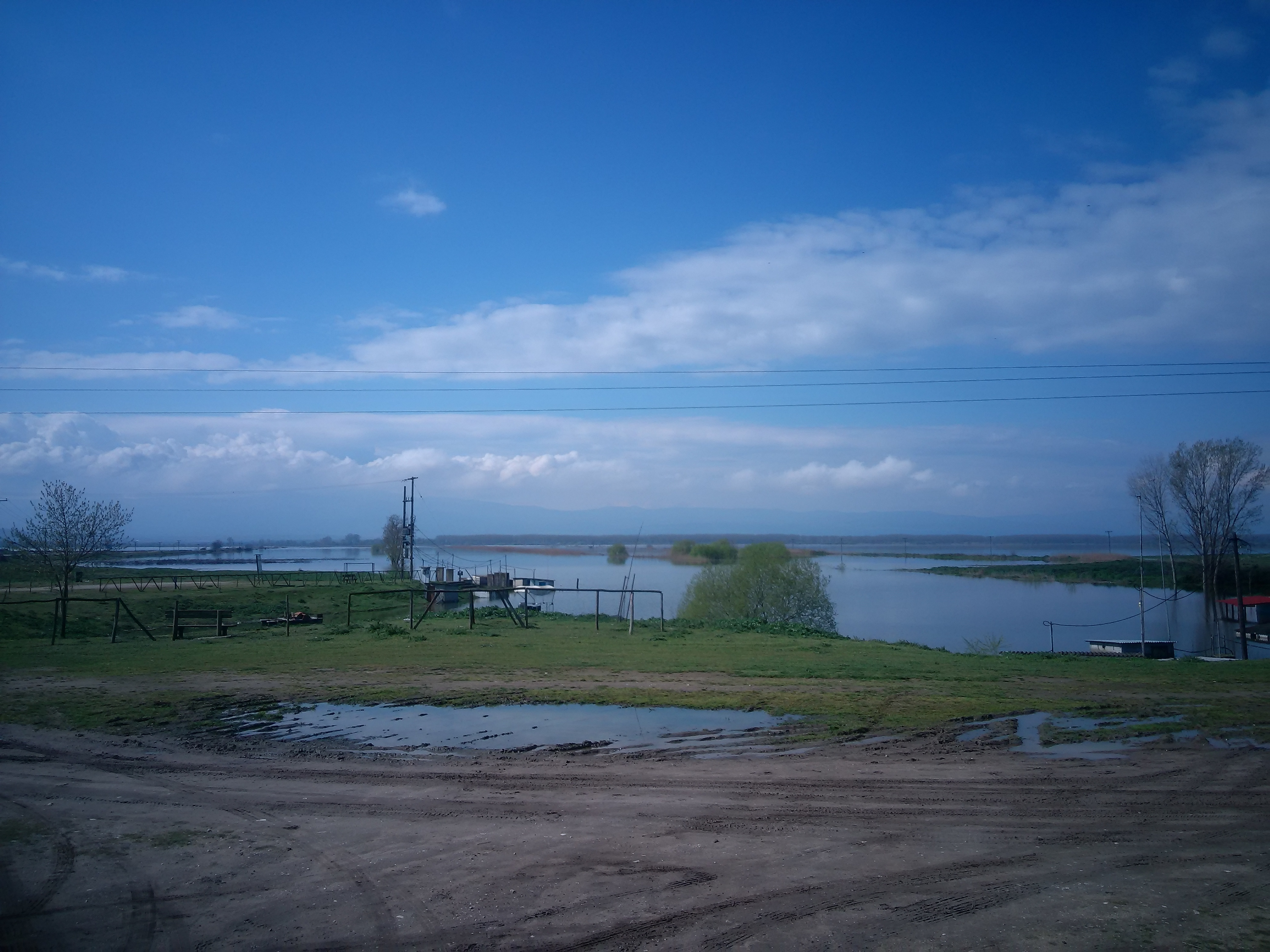

- Location within Greece
- Coordinates: 40°58′N 23°43′E
- Country: Greece
- Administrative region: Central Macedonia
- Regional unit: Serres
- Municipality: Emmanouil Pappas
- Municipal unit: Strymonas

Population (2021)
  - Community: 344
- Time zone: UTC+2 (EET)
  - Summer (DST): UTC+3 (EEST)

Pethelinos (Greek: Πεθελινός) is a small village in the Serres regional unit of Central Macedonia, Greece 22 km away from the town of Serres, and 2.5 km from the Strymon River. The village has 344 inhabitants (2021). It is part of the municipal unit Emmanouil Pappas municipality. The village has one church of Saint Nikolaos close to the village's square and one chapel of Prophet Elias, built on a hill just outside the village.

The region of Pethelinos was inhabited since prehistoric times. Near the village has been discovered the site of an ancient lakeside settlement, which survived throughout antiquity and probably bore the name "Potolinos". In Byzantine times the village is mentioned in documents as "Potholinos".

== See also ==
- List of settlements in the Serres regional unit
