= Lefkothea (disambiguation) =

Lefkothea may refer to:

== Places in Greece ==
- Lefkothea, Ioannina, a village in Evrymenes, Ioannina
- Lefkothea, Kozani
- Lefkothea, Alistrati, Serres, Macedonia

== Other uses ==
- Lefkothea Nicosia, a women's association football club

== See also ==
- Lefkosia, or Nicosia
