= Kalokastro =

Village in Central Macedonia, Greece

Coordinates: 41°00′52″N 23°20′09″E

Kalokastro (Greek: Καλόκαστρο) is a village in Serres regional unit of Central Macedonia, Greece, located 26 km southwest of the city of Serres. Since 2011 administrative reform it is a municipal unit of the municipality of Irakleia. It has a population of 368 inhabitants and its former name was “Sartikli”.

== History ==
=== Antiquity ===
On the hill "Assar", which rises right next to Kalokastro, the ruins of an important ancient city are preserved, where inscriptions, coins and various other archaeological finds (clay statuettes, vases and numerous pottery shells) of Classic, Hellenistic and Roman times, were found. The city, which belonged to the Bisaltia, is probably identified with the Euporia (Greek: Ευπορία) mentioned by the geographer Ptolemy and the Roman itineraries. This identification is also reinforced by her position near the river Strymonas as well as by etymology of her name from the words "ευ" and "πόρος" meaning a city that is near an easy crossing of the river.

=== Modern ===
The area was the subject of fighting in the First World War. The Struma War Cemetery was added in 1920 to a design by Sir Robert Lorimer.
