= Therma, Serres =

Village in Central Macedonia, Greece

Coordinates: 40.896°N 23.556°E

Therma (Greek: Θερμά) a village in Serres regional unit of Central Macedonia, Greece, located 28 km south of the city of Serres and near (southeast) Nigrita. It is a municipal unit of the municipality of Visaltia and has a population of 574 inhabitants. It was previously very known for its thermal baths.

== History ==
=== Antiquity ===
In the present village of Therma, traces of an ancient settlement were found, that was on the Roman road of Amphipolis-Heraclea Sintica. Right next to the village, at the sites "Paliambela" and "Mizaria", the necropolis would extend, as evidenced by the finding of ancient graves. Also inside the village, during the construction of houses, foundations of ancient buildings were revealed. Lastly, during the works for the construction of the water supply network, various inscriptions had come to light. The foundation of this ancient settlement should have been related to the use of the thermal springs here and the construction of suitable thermal baths.
