= Agia Paraskevi, Serres =

Agia Paraskevi Αγία Παρασκευή
- Community
- Location within Greece
- Coordinates: 40°56′58″N 23°27′30″E
- Country: Greece
- Administrative region: Central Macedonia
- Regional unit: Serres
- Municipality: Visaltia
- Municipal unit: Visaltia
- Elevation: 20 m (66 ft)

Population (2021)
  - Community: 380
- Time zone: UTC+2 (EET)
  - Summer (DST): UTC+3 (EEST)
- Postal code: 62200
- Area code: 23220

Agia Paraskevi (Greek: Αγία Παρασκευή) is a village in the region of Serres, northern Greece. According to the 2021 Greek census, the village had 380 inhabitants.

== Geography and history ==
Agia Paraskevi is located to the west limits of the Thessaloniki Regional Unit and south of the Strymonas River. It is built on the plain of Serres, between the villages of Terpni (SE), Nikokleia (SW) and Sisamia (NW). It is located 6 km northwest of Nigrita and 24 km southwest of Serres. The village was known as Xylotro (Ξυλότρο) until 1927, when it got renamed to Agia Paraskevi.

According to the statistics of the Bulgarian geographer Vasil Kanchov, the village had a total of 460 inhabitants in 1900, of which 260 were Orthodox Greeks and 200 were Circassians.
