= Serres Province =

Province of Greece

Serres Province Επαρχία Σερρών
- Province of Greece
- 2006
- Capital: Serres

Serres Province was one of the four provinces of Serres Prefecture of Greece. Its territory corresponded with that of the current municipalities Emmanouel Pappas and Serres, and part of the municipality Irakleia. It was abolished in 2006.
