= Melenikitsi =

Village in Central Macedonia, Greece

Coordinates: 41°08′48″N 23°26′33″E

Melenikitsi (Greek: Μελενικίτσι) is a village in Serres regional unit of Central Macedonia, Greece, located 14 km northwest of the city of Serres. Since 2011 administrative reform it is a municipal unit of the municipality of Irakleia. It has a population of 759 inhabitants and its former name was “Melegitsi”.

== History ==
=== Antiquity ===
Northeast (about 4 km) of Melenikitsi, in the place "Leginitsko", the necropolis of a Roman settlement was discovered, where they had been found three epitaph inscriptions of the imperial times (1st century AD). From the existence of Thracian population, which suggests the Thracian names in the inscriptions, it is deduced that the settlement existed before the Roman conquest. Regarding the ancient topography, the settlement was located near the borders of the Odomantice and Sintice and on the Roman road of Philippi - Heracleia Sintice, which passed through the city of Sirra (Serres today).
