= Gazoros =

Gazoros Γάζωρος
- Community
- Location within Greece
- Coordinates: 41°01′30″N 23°46′30″E
- Country: Greece
- Administrative region: Central Macedonia
- Regional unit: Serres
- Municipality: Nea Zichni
- Municipal unit: Nea Zichni

Population (2021)
  - Community: 912
- Time zone: UTC+2 (EET)
  - Summer (DST): UTC+3 (EEST)

Gazoros or Gazorus (Greek: Γάζωρος) was a town mentioned by Ptolemy to be in the region of Edonis or Odomantike and also by inscriptions of Hellenistic and Roman times.

== History ==
Later in the 4th century BC, it was annexed to the Macedonian kingdom and made a polis under Philip II of Macedon or the Antigonids. Artemis Gazoria or Gazoreitis was worshiped all over the region till Roman times.

In the imperial times, according to epigraphic evidences, Gazoros was a member of a federation of five cities ("Pentapolis") that had its seat in the ancient city of Sirra (today Serres).

According to archeologist Wittek-de-Jong, Zichni became the new feudal center of the ancient Gazoros and it was a land ownership of the Byzantine aristocratc family of Angels, so Siderokastron was for the Komnenos family. Ruins of the medieval castle and village of Zichni are in the background hills of Gazoros.

== Location ==
Gazoros is located in Greece 3 km to the east of the modern village with the same name, on the hill of "Haghios Athanasios". The modern town Gazoros is part of the municipality Nea Zichni, in the Serres regional unit of Central Macedonia.

== See also ==
List of settlements in the Serres regional unit
