= Nea Petra =

Nea Petra Νέα Πέτρα
- Community
- Location within Greece
- Coordinates: 40°59′N 23°46′E
- Country: Greece
- Administrative region: Central Macedonia
- Regional unit: Serres
- Municipality: Nea Zichni
- Elevation: 65 m (213 ft)

Population (2021)
  - Community: 196
- Time zone: UTC+2 (EET)
  - Summer (DST): UTC+3 (EEST)
- Vehicle registration: ΕΡ

Nea Petra (Greek: Νέα Πέτρα) is a village in the Serres regional unit of Central Macedonia, Greece. Nea Petra is located around 23 km south east of the city of Serres.

== History ==
According to the Ethnological Museum of Thrace, Greeks from Kayali settled in Nea Petra. During the Balkan Wars, Bulgaria annexed the village until 1913. After the Minor Asia Catastrophe in 1922 some Arvanites settled in Nea Petra. Before 1927 Nea Petra was called Tsianos.

== Babo/Vrexoudia tradition ==
Ever since 1923, on 8 January, a tradition takes place in Nea Petra called Babo or Vrexoudia. According to this tradition, women take over the village and force the men to do the home chores. During the Vrexoudia tradition on the same day, women actively provoke water fights with the men of the village. The 8th of January is also called the day of Gynecocracy in Nea Petra due to this tradition.

== Population ==
Historical population
| Year | Pop. | ±% |
|---|---|---|
| 1961 | 733 | — |
| 1971 | 618 | −15.7% |
| 1981 | 448 | −27.5% |
| 1991 | 407 | −9.2% |
| 2001 | 327 | −19.7% |
| 2011 | 277 | −15.3% |
| 2021 | 196 | −29.2% |

== Notable people ==
Michalis Tzelepis, MP of ΠΑΣΟΚ
