= Triantafyllia =

Triantafyllia may refer to the following places in Greece:

- Triantafyllia, Florina, a village in Florina municipality
- Triantafyllia, Serres, a village in Visaltia municipality
