= Paralimni, Serres =

Village in Greece

Paralimni Παραλίμνι
- Community
- Location within Greece
- Coordinates: 40°59′06″N 23°40′12″E
- Country: Greece
- Administrative region: Central Macedonia
- Regional unit: Serres
- Municipality: Emmanouil Pappas
- Municipal unit: Strymonas

Population (2021)
  - Community: 435
- Time zone: UTC+2 (EET)
  - Summer (DST): UTC+3 (EEST)

Paralimni (Greek: Παραλίμνι, Παραλίμνιο) is a village in Serres regional unit of Central Macedonia, Greece, located 21 km southeast of Serres. Since 2011 administrative reform it has been a municipal unit of the municipality of Emmanouil Pappas. It has a population of 435 inhabitants (2021). Until 1928 it was named "Vernar".

== History ==
About 500 m. north of Paralimni, near the bay of the dried-out ancient Cercinitis lake (later Achinos lake), the traces of a lakeside ancient settlement has been discovered, possibly named "Cima" (Greek: Κιμα), which probably means "bay". A number of ancient vase shells and an inscription of the Hellenistic period were found in this place.
