= Terpni =

Town in Central Macedonia, Greece

Terpni Τερπνή
- Community
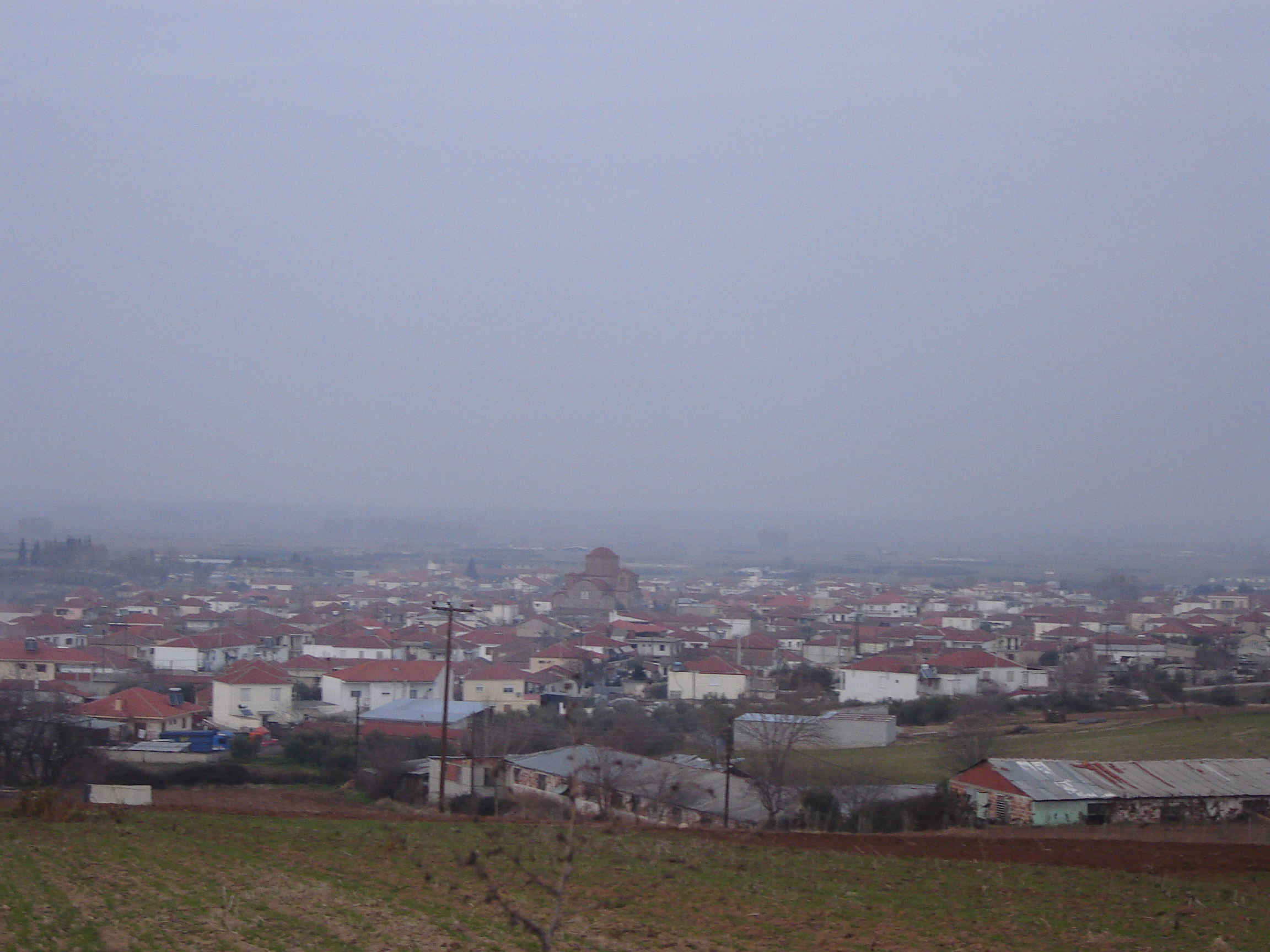

- Location within Greece
- Coordinates: 40°55′N 23°29′E
- Country: Greece
- Administrative region: Central Macedonia
- Regional unit: Serres
- Municipality: Visaltia
- Municipal unit: Nigrita

Population (2021)
  - Community: 1,593
- Time zone: UTC+2 (EET)
  - Summer (DST): UTC+3 (EEST)

Terpni (Greek: Τερπνή) is a small town in the Serres regional unit, Greece. Since the 2011 local government reform it is a municipal unit of the municipality of Visaltia, whose seat is in Nigrita. It has a population of 1,593 inhabitants (2021 census) and until 1928 was named Tserpista.

== History ==
A few kilometers southwest of Terpni, on the hill named Palaiokastro, are preserved the ruins of an ancient settlement identified with the Roman waystation (mutatio) Graero, known from the Roman itineraries.

From a Greek inscription of Roman imperial times, we are informed that this settlement had the size of a city (polis) with all its known architectural monuments (bouleuterion, gymnasium, etc.).

== See also ==
List of settlements in the Serres regional unit
