= Lefkotopos =

Lefkotopos Λευκότοπος
- Community
- Location within Greece
- Coordinates: 40°52.7′N 23°38.5′E
- Country: Greece
- Administrative region: Central Macedonia
- Regional unit: Serres
- Municipality: Visaltia
- Municipal unit: Achinos

Population (2021)
  - Community: 230
- Time zone: UTC+2 (EET)
  - Summer (DST): UTC+3 (EEST)

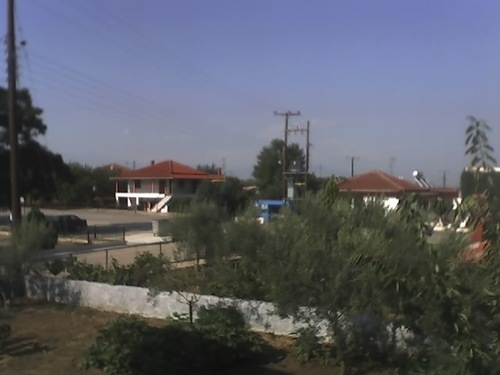
Lefkotopos, partial view

Lefkotopos (Greek: Λευκότοπος) is a village in the municipal unit of Achinos, Serres regional unit, Central Macedonia, Greece. It has 230 inhabitants (2021). In Lefkotopos is situated the KEP (Citizens Service Center, ΚΕΠ) of the municipal unit of Achinos.

The village was founded in 1922, by Pontic Greeks, also by Greek inhabitants of North-East Anatolia ("Pontus"), an area whose population has been Greek since the early Greek history, and who were expelled from their homes in 1922, by the Turks.

The inhabitants of the village are mostly farmers who grow tobacco, olives, vegetables, fig tree fruits, organic products (almonds, nuts) and herbs.

The club of the former inhabitants of the village, who now live in Thessaloniki, organize on 28 August of every year (this is the day before the holy day of Saint Ioannis Prodromos, to whom the newly built village church is devoted).

The distance of the village from the sea (Amphipolis / A2 motorway (Egnatia Odos)) is approximately 35 km (22 mi), from Serres 40 km (25 mi), from Kavala 55 km (34 mi) and from Thessaloniki 90 km (56 mi).

== See also ==
- Greco-Turkish War (1919–1922)
