= Triantafyllia, Serres =

Triantafyllia Τριανταφυλλιά
- Community
- Location within Greece
- Coordinates: 40°59′00″N 23°20′50″E
- Country: Greece
- Administrative region: Central Macedonia
- Regional unit: Serres
- Municipality: Visaltia
- Municipal unit: Visaltia

Population (2021)
  - Community: 431
- Time zone: UTC+2 (EET)
  - Summer (DST): UTC+3 (EEST)

View of Triantafyllia

Triantafyllia (Greek: Τριανταφυλλιά, before 1988: Τριανταφυλλιές - Triantafyllies, before 1927: Μαχμουτζή - Machmoutzi) is a village and a community in Visaltia municipality, Serres regional unit, Central Macedonia, Greece. The population was 892 in 2001, but had dropped to 431 by 2021.
