= Krinida =

Village in Central Macedonia, Greece

Coordinates: 40.995°N 23.984°E

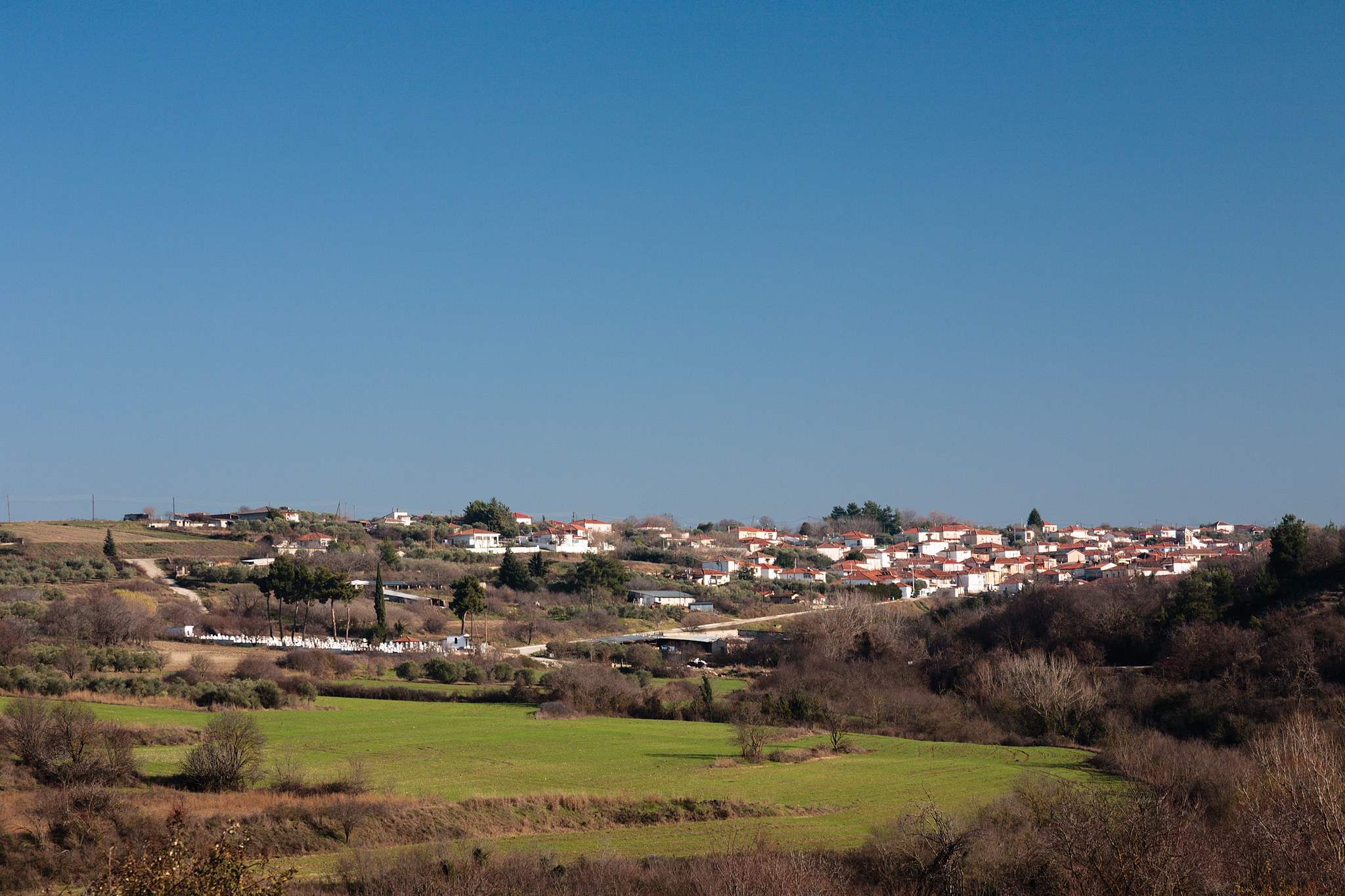
Krinida

Krinida (Greek: Κρηνίδα) is a village in Serres regional unit of Central Macedonia, Greece, located 48 km southeast of the city of Serres. Since 2011 administrative reform it is a municipal unit of the municipality of Amphipolis and has a population of 573 inhabitants. Until 1958 it was named Vitasta.

== History ==
=== Antiquity ===
About two kilometers north of Krinida, in the sites of “Toumba” or “Palia vouna”, there was a Roman settlement, dependent administratively on the Roman colony of Philippi. in this place was found fragments of Roman pottery and a Latin inscription (of imperial times), which mentions a Roman settler of Philippi. In the place "Palia ecclesia" was also found a Greek votive inscription in the "Hero of Avlonitis" (3rd century AD), where are mentioned Thracian and Roman names. The existence of Thracian population allows the conclusion that the settlement existed before the Roman conquest and belonged to the ancient Edonis.
