= Metalla, Serres =

Village and former community in Greece

Coordinates: 41°04′44″N 23°44′38″E

Metalla (Greek: Μέταλλα) is a village and former community in Serres regional unit, of Central Macedonia, located 21 km east of the city of Serres. Since the 2011 reform it belongs administratively to the municipality of Emmanouil Pappas. It has a population of 275 inhabitants. Until 1928 was named "Upper Nouska", later was renamed "Upper Daphnoudi" and finally received the current name "Metalla".

== History ==
=== Antiquity ===
A little further north of the current villages of Metalla and Sykia, on the tall and steep hill of "Agios Athanasios", the site of an ancient (Hellenistic and Roman) settlement was located. On the southern slope of the hill and also in the nearby location "Ovatzik" were ancient tombs, coins and inscriptions revealed. In late Roman times the settlement was fortified with an acropolis, of which parts of her wall are now saved on the above hill.
