= Konstantinato =

Konstantinato Κωνσταντινάτο
- Community
- Location within Greece
- Coordinates: 41°01′N 23°32′E
- Country: Greece
- Administrative region: Central Macedonia
- Regional unit: Serres
- Municipality: Serres
- Municipal unit: Kapetan Mitrousi

Population (2021)
  - Community: 269
- Time zone: UTC+2 (EET)
  - Summer (DST): UTC+3 (EEST)

Konstantinato (Greek: Κωνσταντινάτο) is a small town of 269 inhabitants (2021), part of the municipal unit of Serres, northern Greece. It is situated between the Belitsa and Strymon rivers. All inhabitants migrated from Konstantinatoi in Minor Asia during the exchange of populations in 1923 between Turkey and Greece. Konstantinatoi in Minor Asia was also known as Tsatal Agil (Turkish, meaning fork in the road). Konstantinatoi in Minor Asia had a Greek Orthodox Church dedicated to Saint John the Theologian whereas the current Konstantinato has a Greek Orthodox Church dedicated to Saint Panteleimon.
