= Lefkonas =

Village in Central Macedonia, Greece

Lefkonas Λευκώνας
- Municipal unit
- Location within the regional unit

- Location within Greece
- Coordinates: 41°06′N 23°29′E
- Country: Greece
- Administrative region: Central Macedonia
- Regional unit: Serres
- Municipality: Serres

Area
  - Municipal unit: 68.2 km^{2} (26.3 sq mi)

Population (2021)
  - Municipal unit: 3,534
  - Municipal unit density: 51.8/km^{2} (134/sq mi)
  - Community: 2,221
- Time zone: UTC+2 (EET)
  - Summer (DST): UTC+3 (EEST)
- Vehicle registration: ΕΡ

Lefkonas (Greek: Λευκώνας) is a village and a former municipality in the Serres regional unit, Greece. Since the 2011 local government reform it is part of the municipality Serres, of which it is a municipal unit. The municipal unit has an area of 68.247 km^{2}. Population 3,534 (2021).

Near the village - on the hill of "Simitzi-bair" - the location of an ancient settlement has been found.

== Notable people ==
- Sakis Anastasiadis
- Kostas Tsimikas
- Christos Archontidis
- Iraklis Kyriakidis

== See also ==
List of settlements in the Serres regional unit
