= Nea Mpafra =

Village in Central Macedonia, Greece

Nea Mpafra Νέα Μπάφρα
- Community
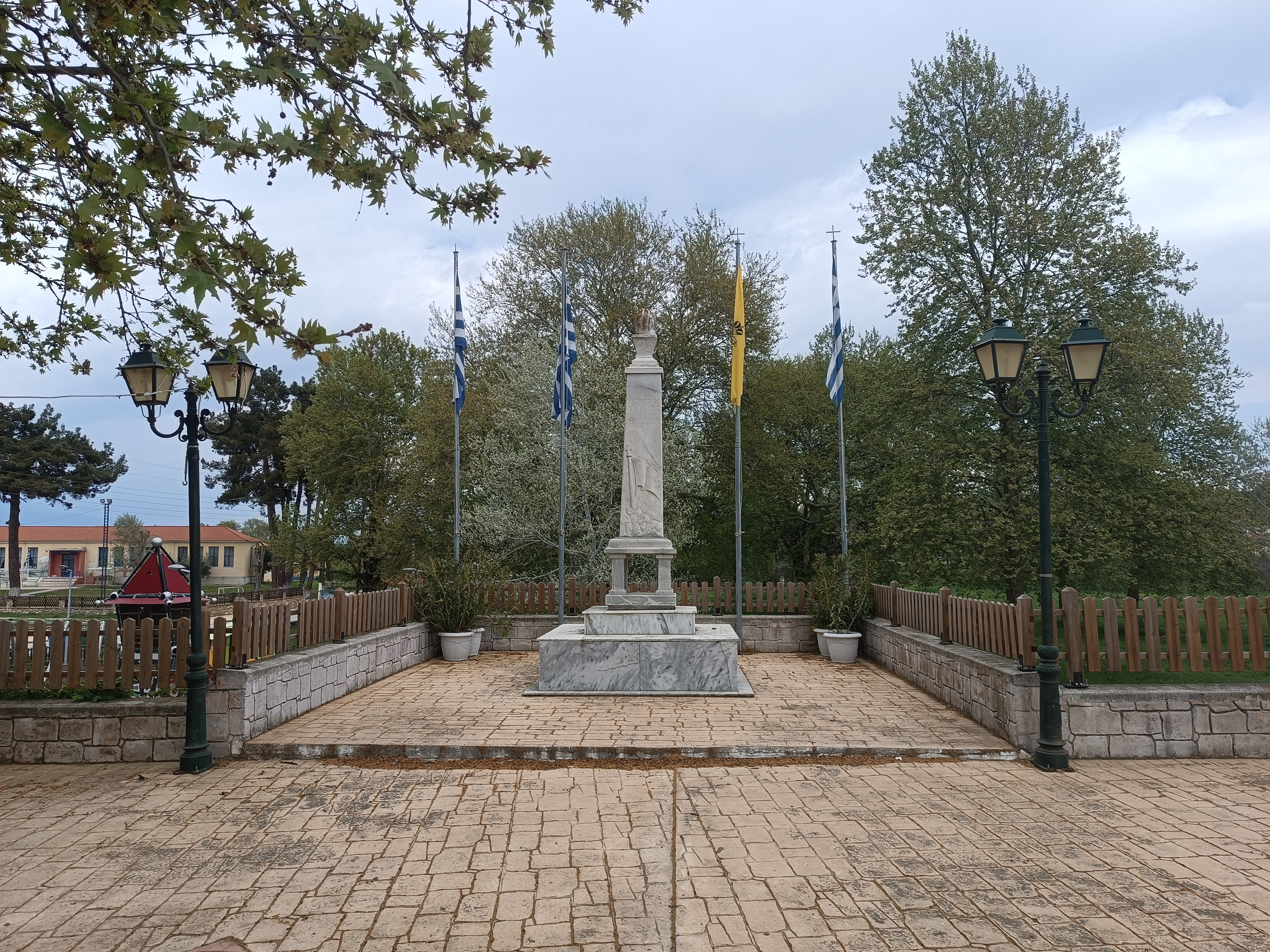
- War memorial in Nea Mpafra

- Location within Greece
- Coordinates: 40°59′19″N 24°01′13″E
- Country: Greece
- Administrative region: Central Macedonia
- Regional unit: Serres
- Municipality: Amphipolis
- Municipal unit: Kormista
- Village established: 1926 (100 years ago)
- Elevation: 180 m (590 ft)

Population (2021)
  - Community: 565
- Time zone: UTC+2 (EET)
  - Summer (DST): UTC+3 (EEST)

Nea Mpafra (Greek: Νέα Μπάφρα), also romanized as Nea Bafra, is a village in Greece, located near the eastern edge of the Serres regional unit in Central Macedonia. It was founded in 1924 by Pontic Greeks from Bafra who got there after the population exchange between Greece and Turkey. Its official establishment was made in 1926 and its name translates to "New Bafra". It is located at an altitude of 180 meters and has a population of 565 according to the 2021 census. The native language of its original settlers was Turkish, which remained the primary language of the village until the 1970s.

== Administration ==
Nea Mpafra is a community of the municipal unit of Kormista in the municipality of Amphipolis. It is located in the easternmost part of the Serres regional unit in the broader administrative region of Central Macedonia.

== History ==
=== Background ===
After the defeat of Greece in the Greco-Turkish War of 1919–1922, a population exchange was agreed between the two countries in the Treaty of Lausanne. From the city of Bafra in Pontus and its surrounding villages an estimated number of 28,000 to 30,000 Pontic Greeks were transferred to Greece, out of whom most scattered around the country. They were in majority Turkish speaking. About 1,500 settled in Harmanköy, a small village that was later built over by Eleftherio-Kordelio during the expansion of the urban area of Thessaloniki. Because they were mainly engaged in the cultivation of tobacco back in Bafra, they decided to move to a new location suitable for tobacco plants and left via train for the Xanthi regional unit. However, while the train was making an overnight stop in Drama, they heard that near the Pangaion Hills there were villages engaged in tobacco cultivation and that there were also abandoned Turkish and Bulgarian houses in the area. Seventy two families decided to depart at the Fotolivos Train Station in what is now the municipality of Prosotsani, from where forty seven families walked all the way to the location of Sanani or Sinani, where Nea Mpafra was eventually established.

=== Conflict with the locals ===
Its settlers arrived there in 1923 and in November 1924 the construction of the village started. However, the local Macedonian Greeks from the nearby village of Küpköy, which was later renamed Proti, claimed that this land should be given to them for grazing and cultivation and had told the Pontic Greeks to leave. On November 5, more than one hundred armed locals attacked the Pontic Greek tents, burned a stable where wood was stored and caused other damages. One of the locals even assaulted the Pontic priest by cutting his beard, which holds great importance in orthodox priesthood. Twelve people were injured and were transferred to Drama for hospitalization, while multiple arrests were also made. The military was sent to the location and the case remained open until December of the same year, with the construction of the village being allowed. Nea Mpafra was officially established in 1926.

=== Linguistic evolution ===
Despite being ethnic Greeks, the native language of the original settlers of Nea Mpafra was Turkish. Although the next generations were all schooled exclusively in Greek, it was only with the third generation that Greek was introduced at home and Turkish has definitely prevailed with the fourth generation, notably since the 1970s/1980s. A field survey conducted in 2005 and 2007 found out that Turkish still had notable presence in the village, being fluently spoken by a large part of the population, namely those above 35, while its use had declined among the younger individuals. The survey interviewed 36 people aged between 22 and 84 in Nea Mpafra and the village of Mpafra in the Ioannina regional unit, a smaller village most of whose inhabitants trace their origins to Bafra as well. Its results revealed that 80% of the interviewees had a “solid command” of Turkish (spanning moderate to very good proficiency), while only 5% lacked any knowledge of the language.

== Historical population ==
Historical population
Year	Pop.	±%
1981	845	—
1991	991	+17.3%
2001	1,011	+2.0%
2011	716	−29.2%
2021	565	−21.1%
