= Christos Archontidis =

Greek football manager (1938–2019)

Personal information
- Date of birth: 26 June 1938
- Place of birth: Lefkonas, Serres, Greece
- Date of death: 22 October 2019 (aged 81)

Managerial career
- Years: Team
- 1972–1973: Edessaikos
- 1976–1977: Panserraikos
- 1977–1978: Niki Volos
- 1978–1979: Pierikos
- 1979–1980: Panserraikos
- 1981: Korinthos
- 1982–1984: Greece
- 1984: Doxa Drama
- 1984–1985: PAS Giannina
- 1986: Doxa Drama
- 1987: Iraklis
- 1987–1989: Diagoras
- 1991–1992: Apollon Smyrnis
- 1993–1994: AEL
- 1995–1996: Panachaiki
- 1996–1997: PAOK
- 1997: Athinaikos
- 1998: Apollon Smyrnis
- 1998–1999: Panserraikos
- 2000: Panachaiki
- 2000: Apollon Smyrnis
- 2000–2001: Panserraikos
- 2001: Apollon Smyrnis
- 2001–2002: Panserraikos
- 2003: Panserraikos
- 2005: Apollon Smyrnis

Christos Archontidis (Greek: Χρήστος Αρχοντίδης) (26 June 1938 – 22 October 2019) was a Greek football manager.

He managed Edessaikos, Niki Volos, Pierikos, Korinthos, Greece, Doxa Drama, PAS Giannina, Iraklis, Diagoras, Panachaiki, PAOK, Apollon Smyrnis and Panserraikos.
