= Chortero =

Chortero Χορτερό
- Community
- Location within Greece
- Coordinates: 41°13′10″N 23°22′10″E
- Country: Greece
- Administrative region: Central Macedonia
- Regional unit: Serres
- Municipality: Sintiki
- Municipal unit: Sidirokastro

Population (2021)
  - Community: 509
- Time zone: UTC+2 (EET)
  - Summer (DST): UTC+3 (EEST)

Chortero (Greek: Χορτερό, Bulgarian: Латрово) is a village in the municipality Sintiki, Macedonian region of Greece, 24 km from the city of Serres. As of 2021, Chortero comprises 509 inhabitants, the majority of whom are farmers. Potatoes are the main crop.
