= Angitis =

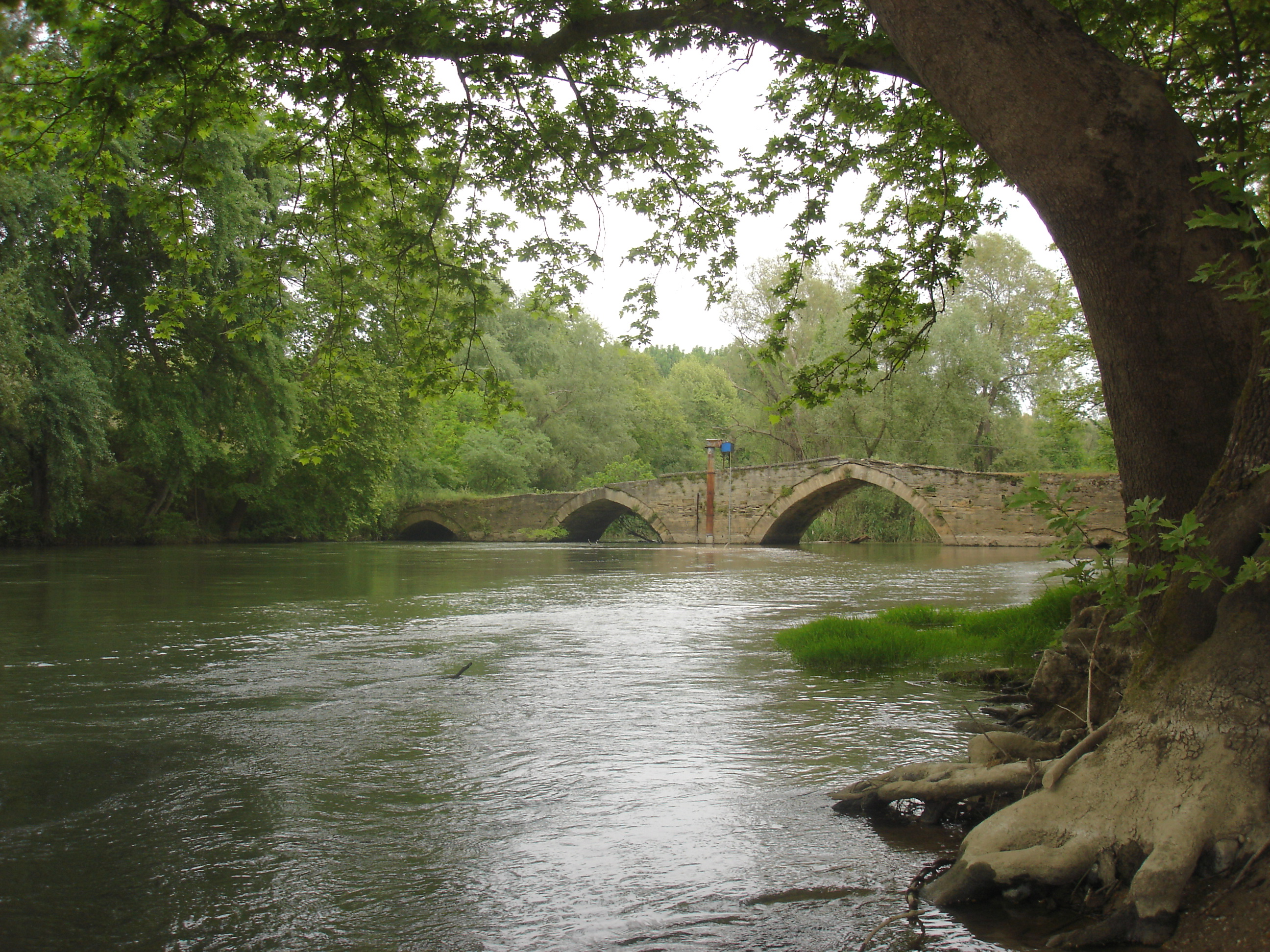
- The old bridge of Angitis River in Angista Rail Station (village in Nea Zichni Municipality)
- Native name: Αγγίτης (Greek)

Location
- Country: Greece

Physical characteristics
- Mouth
  - location: Strymonas
  - coordinates: 40.9021°N 23.8105°E

Basin features
- Progression: Struma→ Aegean Sea

The Angitis (Greek: Αγγίτης), also known as Angista (Bulgarian: Драматица; Dramatitsa), is a river in Northern Greece. It is 75 km (47 mi) long. It is an important tributary of the Strymonas.

Its source is in the Falakro mountains, in the regional unit of Drama, near the town of Prosotsani. It flows south until Fotolivos, where it turns west and enters the Serres regional unit. It flows into the Strymonas near Tragilos.

The river is the setting for a number of extreme sports, including rafting. The Angitis cave is 21 km (13 mi) long. A short distance from the cave is the gorge of the Angitis, 15 km (9.3 mi) in length with a depth that reaches 100 m (330 ft) down to the river bed.

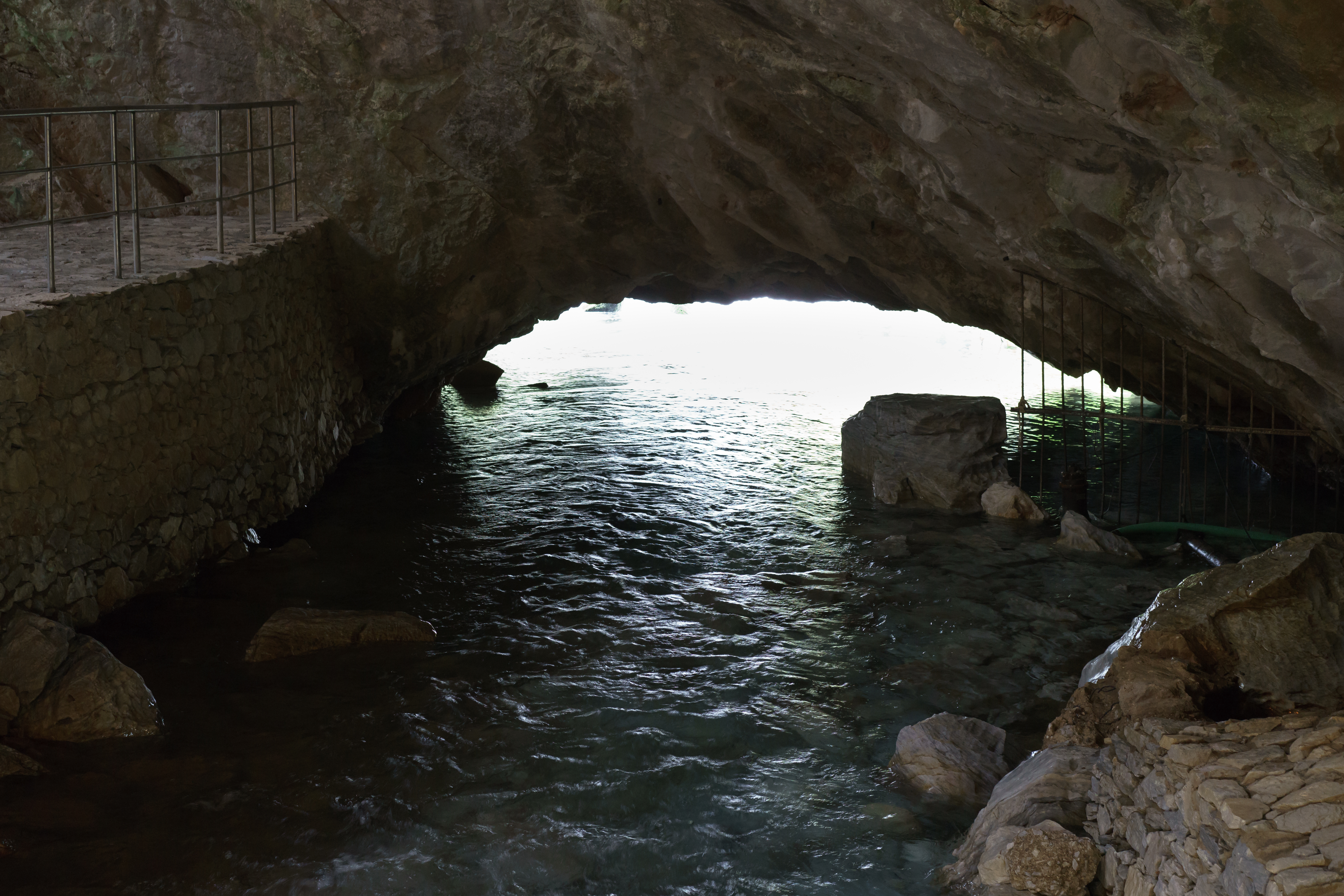
Angitis source inside the cave

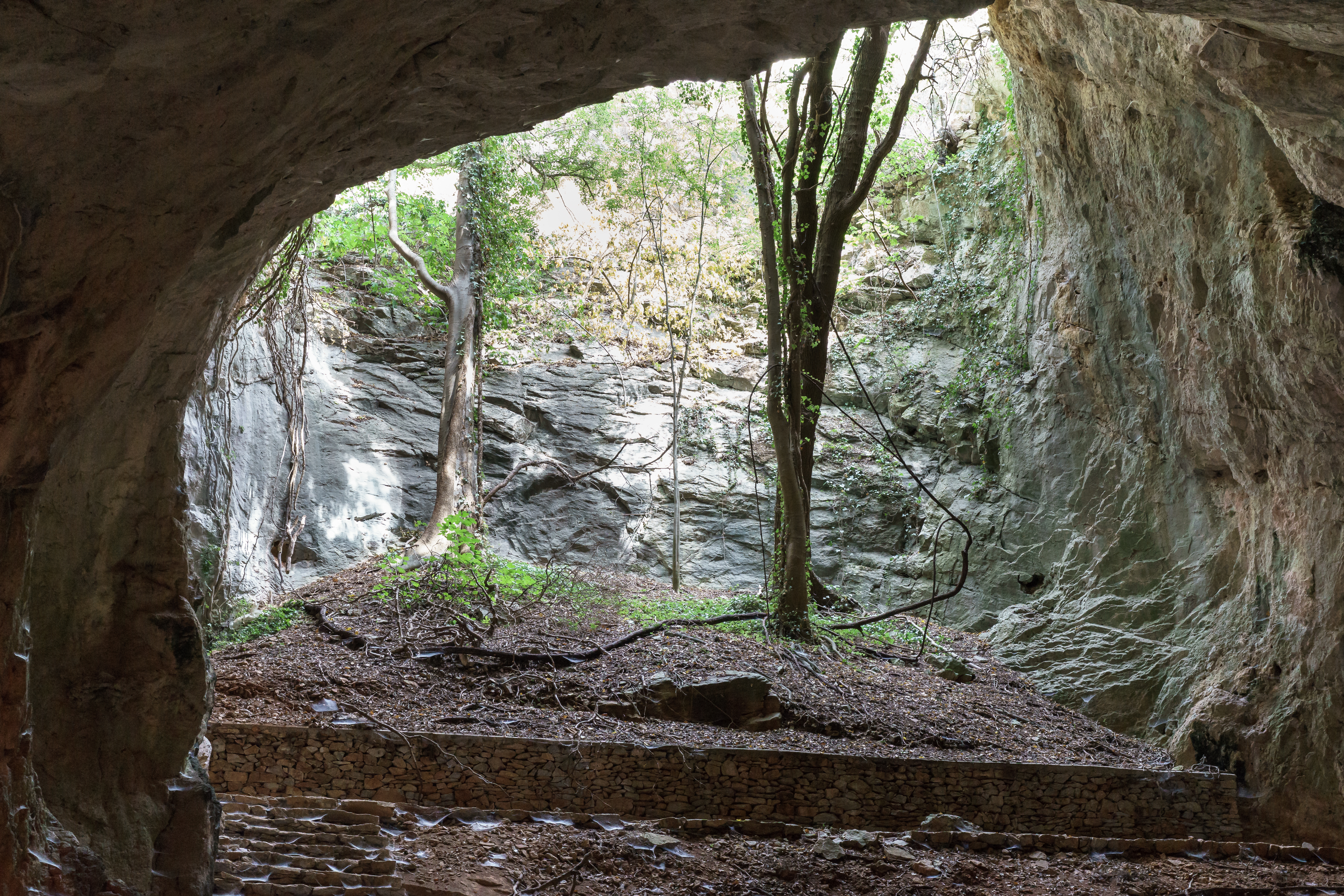
Angitis cave

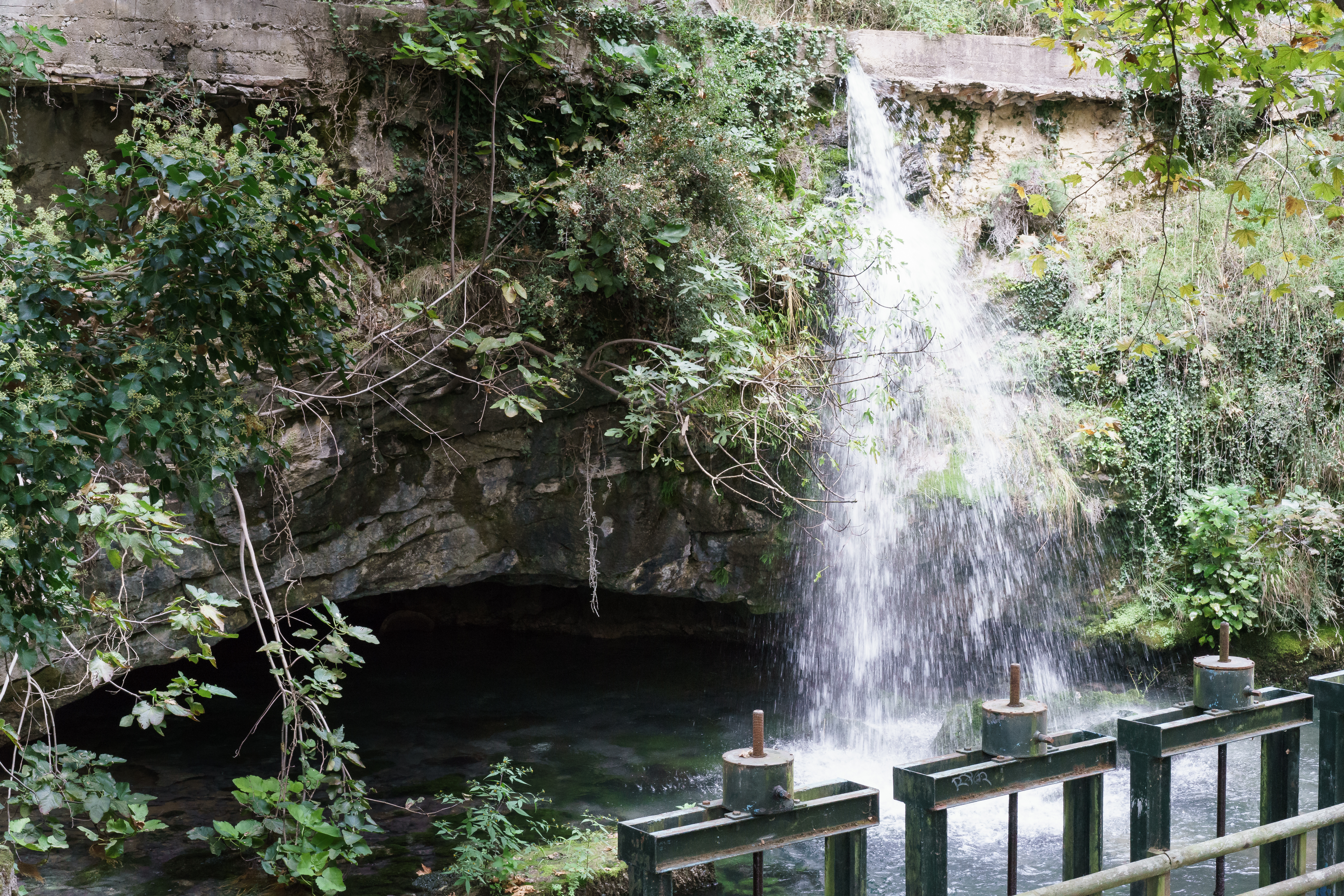
Angitis source in front of the cave

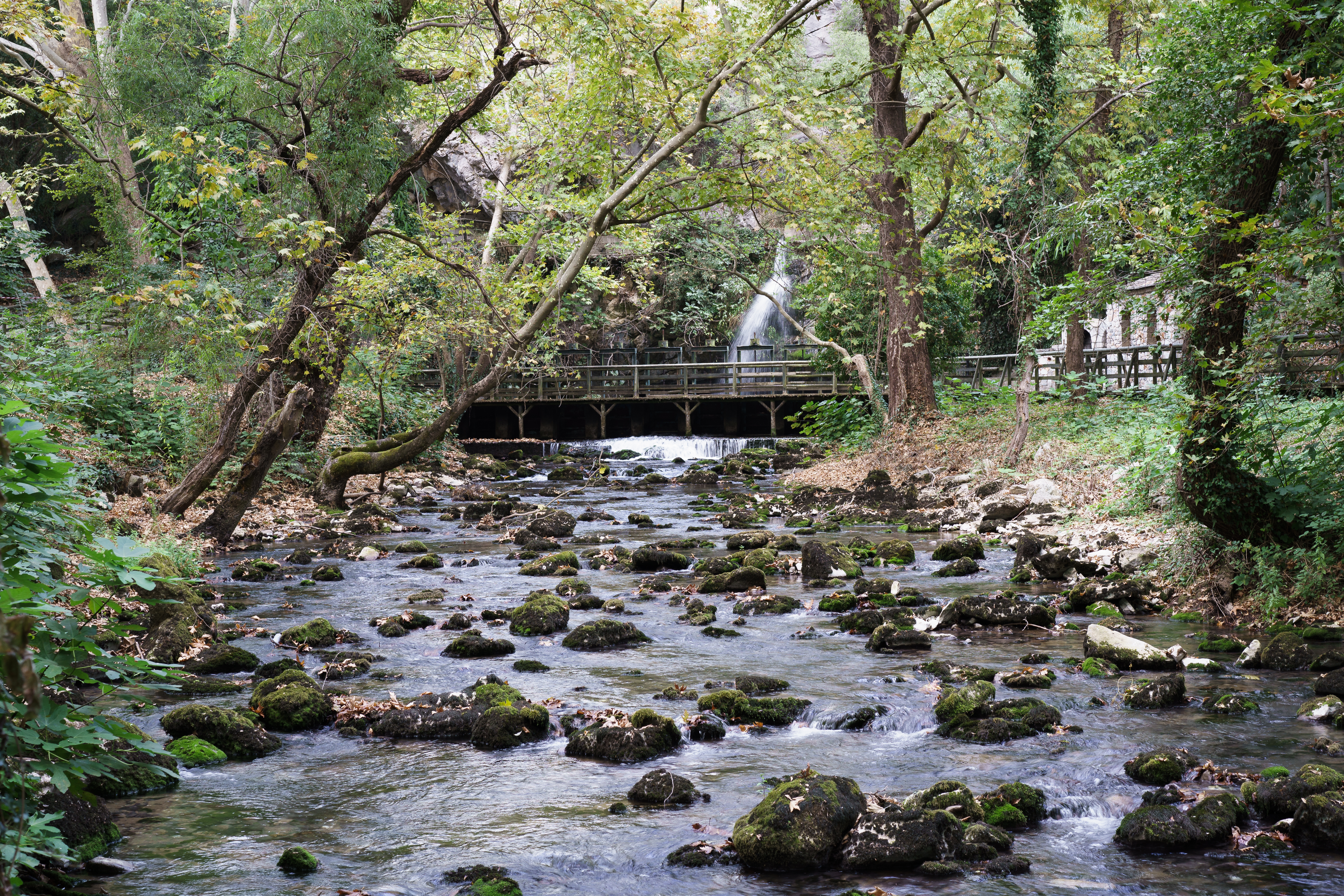
Angitis near the source

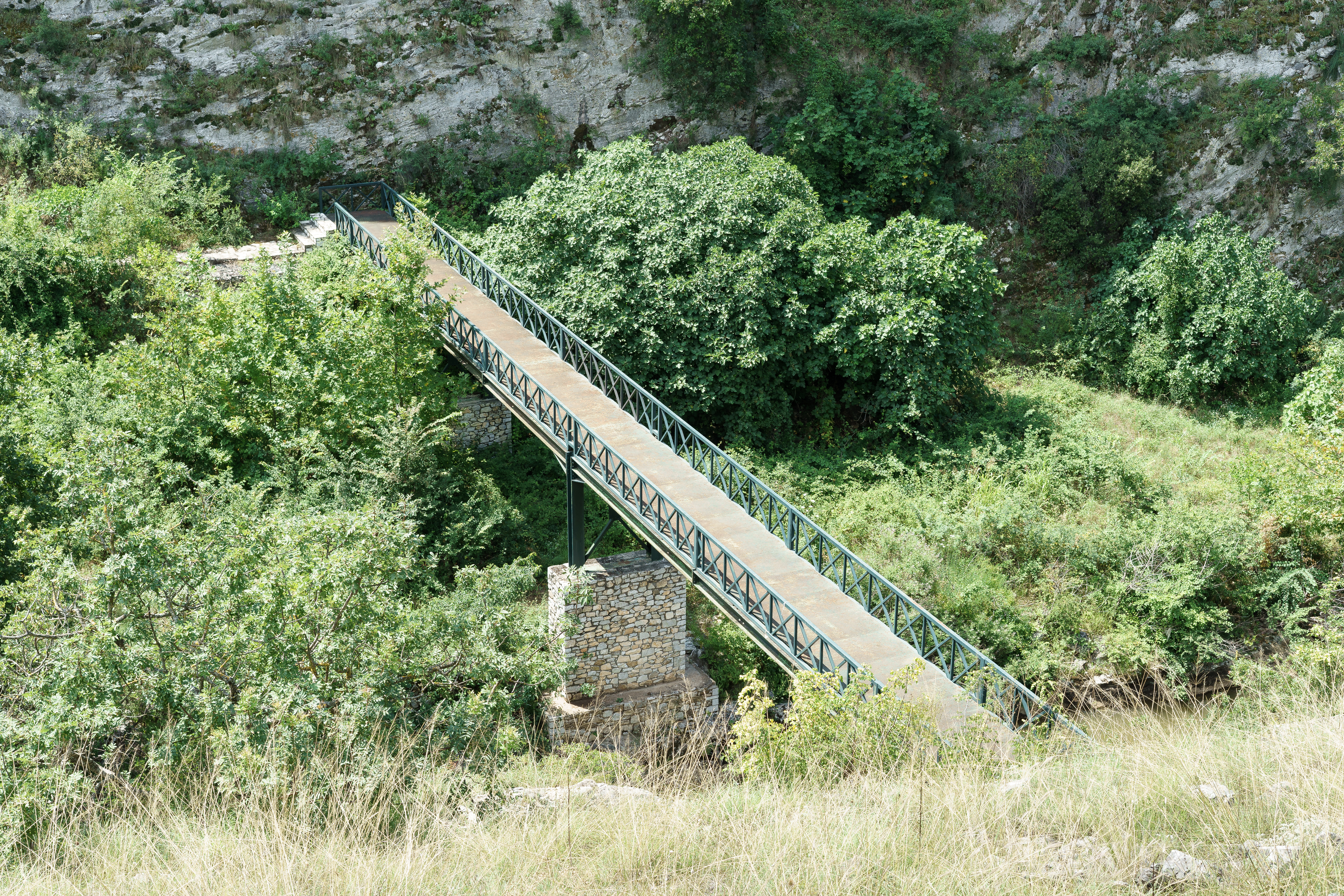
Bridge over the Angitis Canyon near the Alistratis Cave

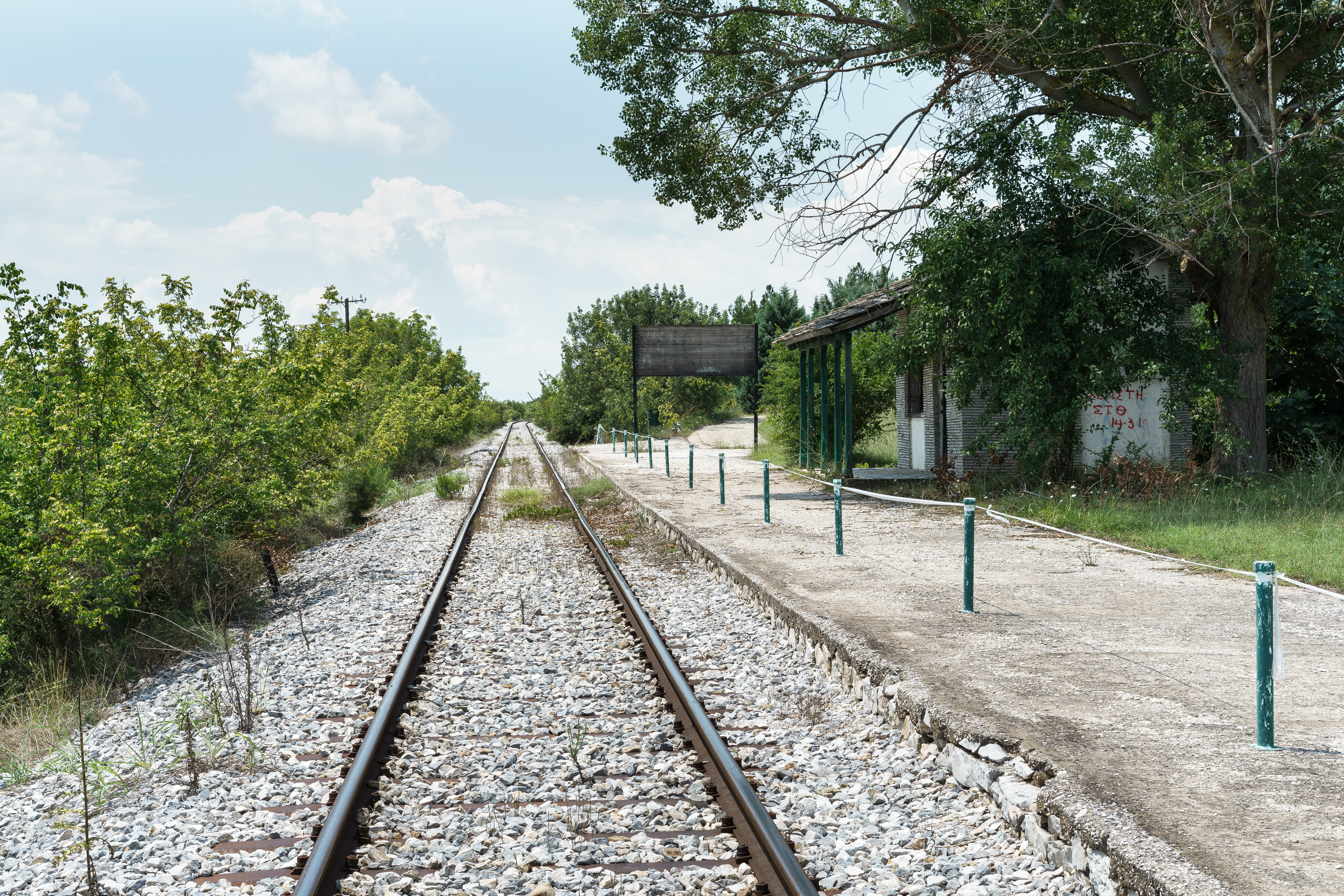
Bahnstation Kryopigi (Spileo Alistratis / Angitis Canyon) near the Alistratis Cave
