= Oinoussa =

Village in Central Macedonia, Greece

Coordinates: 41°06′09″N 23°37′35″E

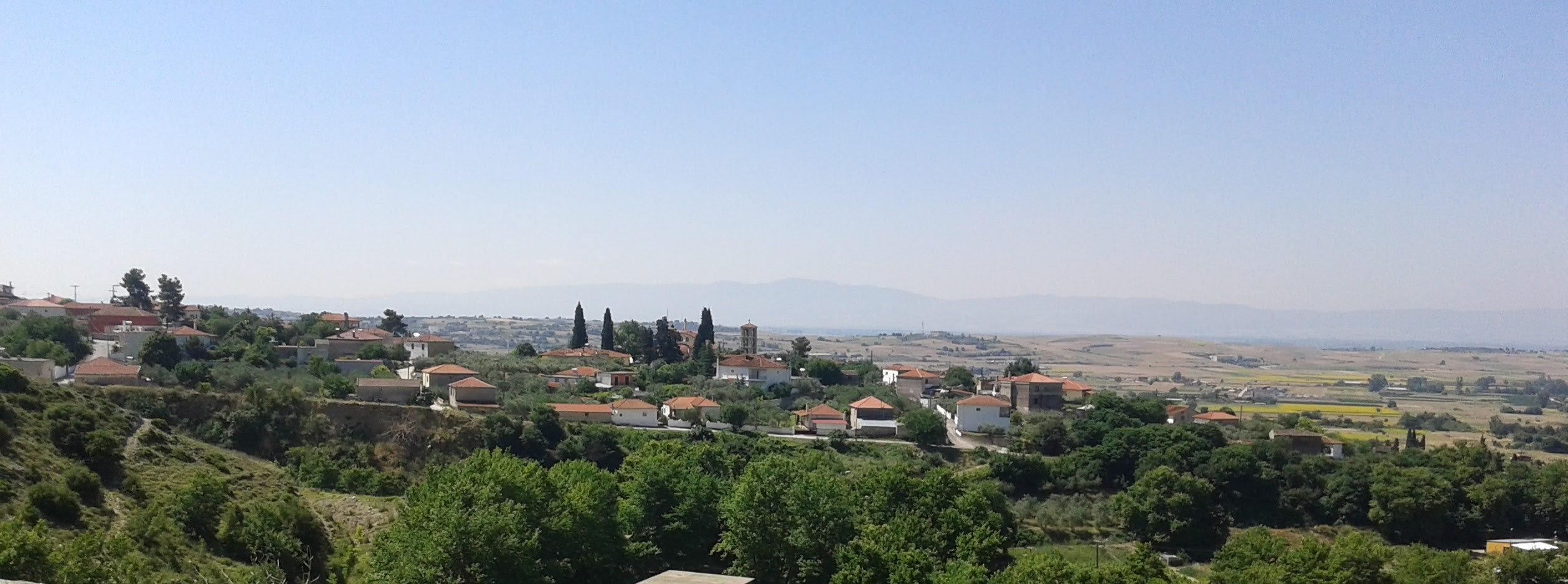
Image of Oinoussa

Oinoussa (Greek: Οινούσσα) is a village in Serres regional unit of Central Macedonia, Greece, located 7 km east of the city of Serres. Administratively it belongs to the municipality of Serres. It has a population of 524 inhabitants and until 1928 was named “Dervesiani”.

== History ==
=== Antiquity ===
South of Oinoussa, on the hill of "Prophet Elias", was revealed the necropolis of a Roman settlement, where three inscriptions had been found (two of them in Latin). Also, northeast from Eptamyloi and about 2 km north of Oinoussa, on the steep rocky hill of “Phaneromeni”, the place of another fortified Roman settlement was located. At the top of the same hill, an ancient rural sanctuary of "Hero Avlonitis" (Greek: Ήρως Αυλωνίτης) had previously been discovered. It is the "Thracian Horseman" (or "Hero") that received this adjective from the toponym "Avlon" (= gorge, ravine) in which its sanctuary was located. So it is concluded that the ancient settlement here was probably called "Avlon" (Greek: Αυλών). This view is reinforced by the earlier name of the settlement "Dervesiani", which is inherited from the Indo-European root "derven" meaning a narrow passage (= Avlon).
