= Nigrita =

Nigrita Νιγρίτα
- Municipal unit
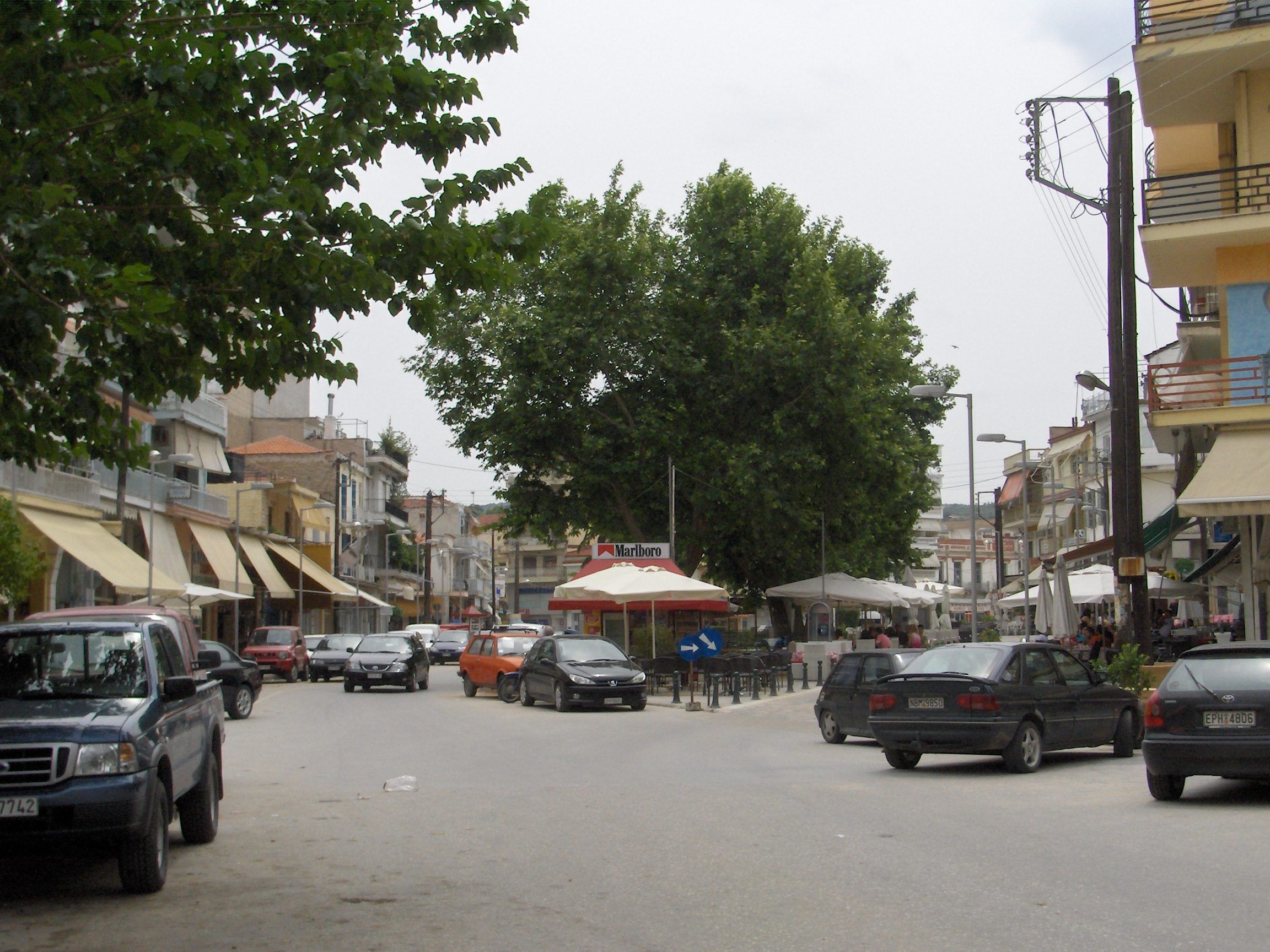

- Location within the regional unit

- Location within Greece
- Coordinates: 40°54′N 23°32′E
- Country: Greece
- Administrative region: Central Macedonia
- Regional unit: Serres
- Municipality: Visaltia
- Districts: Center

Area
  - Municipal unit: 160.9 km^{2} (62.1 sq mi)
- Elevation: 67 m (220 ft)

Population (2021)
  - Municipal unit: 7,865
  - Municipal unit density: 48.88/km^{2} (126.6/sq mi)
  - Community: 4,892
- Time zone: UTC+2 (EET)
  - Summer (DST): UTC+3 (EEST)
- Postal code: 622 00
- Area code: +30 2322
- Vehicle registration: ΕΡ
- Website: www.dimosvisaltias.gr

Nigrita (Greek: Νιγρίτα) is a city and a former municipality in the Serres regional unit, Macedonia, Greece. Since the 2011 local government reform it is part of the municipality Visaltia, of which it is the seat and a municipal unit. The municipal unit has an area of 160.888 km^{2}. It is situated in the wide plain south of the river Strymonas, at the northern foot of the Kerdylio mountains, in the southern part of the Serres regional unit. Nigrita is located 22 km south of Serres, and 92 km northeast of Thessaloniki.

== History ==
Near Nigrita have been found several sites of ancient settlements of the Hellenistic and Roman times. One of them was perhaps the site of the ancient city Bisaltia, capital of the Bisaltae, which is known by Stephanus of Byzantium.

In the Ottoman tahrir defter (number 7) of 1478 (Hijri 883), the settlement is recorded as a village with the name Nigrita, within the kaza of Siroz. At the beginning of the 19th century, it was a prosperous town where cotton, silver and copper were processed. The town became a part of Kingdom of Greece after the 1913 Second Balkan War.

According to the statistics of Vasil Kanchov ("Macedonia, Ethnography and Statistics"), 2,500 Greek Christians lived in the village in 1900.

== Subdivisions ==
The municipal unit Nigrita is subdivided into the following communities:

- Anthi
- Flampouro
- Nigrita
- Terpni
- Therma

== Historical population ==
Year	Town population	Municipality population
1991	6,186	10,668
2001	5,566	9,783
2011	4,947	8,963
2021	4,892	7,865

== See also ==
- List of settlements in the Serres regional unit
- Austen Harrison, town planner of Nigrita after WWI
