= Achinos, Serres =

Achinos Αχινός
- Municipal unit
- Location within the regional unit

- Location within Greece
- Coordinates: 40°55′N 23°39′E
- Country: Greece
- Administrative region: Central Macedonia
- Regional unit: Serres
- Municipality: Visaltia

Area
  - Municipal unit: 155.4 km^{2} (60.0 sq mi)

Population (2021)
  - Municipal unit: 1,751
  - Municipal unit density: 11.27/km^{2} (29.18/sq mi)
  - Community: 365
- Time zone: UTC+2 (EET)
  - Summer (DST): UTC+3 (EEST)
- Vehicle registration: ΕΡ

Achinos (Greek: Αχινός) is a village and a former municipality in the Serres regional unit, Greece. Since the 2011 local government reform it is part of the municipality Visaltia, of which it is a municipal unit. The municipal unit has an area of 155.432 km^{2}. Population 1,751 (2021). The seat of the municipality was in Sitochori. Other communities in the municipal unit are Dafni, Zervochori, Lefkotopos, Patrikio and Choumniko. The name Achinos is the Greek word for sea urchins.
