= Strymoniko =

Village in Central Macedonia, Greece

Strymoniko Στρυμονικό
- Municipal unit
- Location within the regional unit

- Location within Greece
- Coordinates: 41°03′N 23°19′E
- Country: Greece
- Administrative region: Central Macedonia
- Regional unit: Serres
- Municipality: Irakleia

Area
  - Municipal unit: 156.9 km^{2} (60.6 sq mi)

Population (2021)
  - Municipal unit: 2,519
  - Municipal unit density: 16.05/km^{2} (41.58/sq mi)
  - Community: 945
- Time zone: UTC+2 (EET)
  - Summer (DST): UTC+3 (EEST)
- Vehicle registration: ΕΡ
- Website: http://www.strymoniko.com

Strymoniko (Greek: Στρυμονικό) is a village and a former municipality in the Serres regional unit, Greece. Since the 2011 local government reform it is part of the municipality Irakleia, of which it is a municipal unit. The municipal unit has an area of 156.850 km^{2}. Population 2,519 (2021).
