= Kormista =

Kormista Κορμίστα
- Municipal unit
- Location within the regional unit

- Location within Greece
- Coordinates: 40°59′N 24°03′E
- Country: Greece
- Administrative region: Central Macedonia
- Regional unit: Serres
- Municipality: Amphipolis

Area
  - Municipal unit: 74.41 km^{2} (28.73 sq mi)

Population (2021)
  - Municipal unit: 1,450
  - Municipal unit density: 19.5/km^{2} (50.5/sq mi)
  - Community: 437
- Time zone: UTC+2 (EET)
  - Summer (DST): UTC+3 (EEST)
- Vehicle registration: ΕΡ

Kormista (Greek: Κορμίστα) is a village and a former municipality in the Serres regional unit, Greece. Since the 2011 local government reform it is part of the municipality Amfipoli, of which it is a municipal unit. The municipal unit has an area of 74.410 km^{2} (28.730 sq mi). Population 1,450 (2021). The seat of the municipality was in Nea Bafra.
