= Lefkothea, Kozani =

Lefkothea Λευκοθέα
- Community
- Location within Greece
- Coordinates: 40°18.57′N 21°18.33′E
- Country: Greece
- Administrative region: Western Macedonia
- Regional unit: Kozani
- Municipality: Voio
- Municipal unit: Neapoli
- Elevation: 800 m (2,600 ft)

Population (2021)
  - Community: 17
- Time zone: UTC+2 (EET)
  - Summer (DST): UTC+3 (EEST)
- Postal code: 500 01
- Area code: +30-2468
- Vehicle registration: ΚΖ

Lefkothea (Greek: Λευκοθέα, before 1927: Χουτούριον – Choutourion), is a village and a community of the Voio municipality. Before the 2011 local government reform it was part of the municipality of Neapoli, of which it was a municipal district. The 2021 census recorded 17 inhabitants in the village.

Choutourion was a mixed village and a part of its population were Greek speaking Muslim Vallahades.
