= Alistrati =

Alistrati Αλιστράτη
- Municipal unit
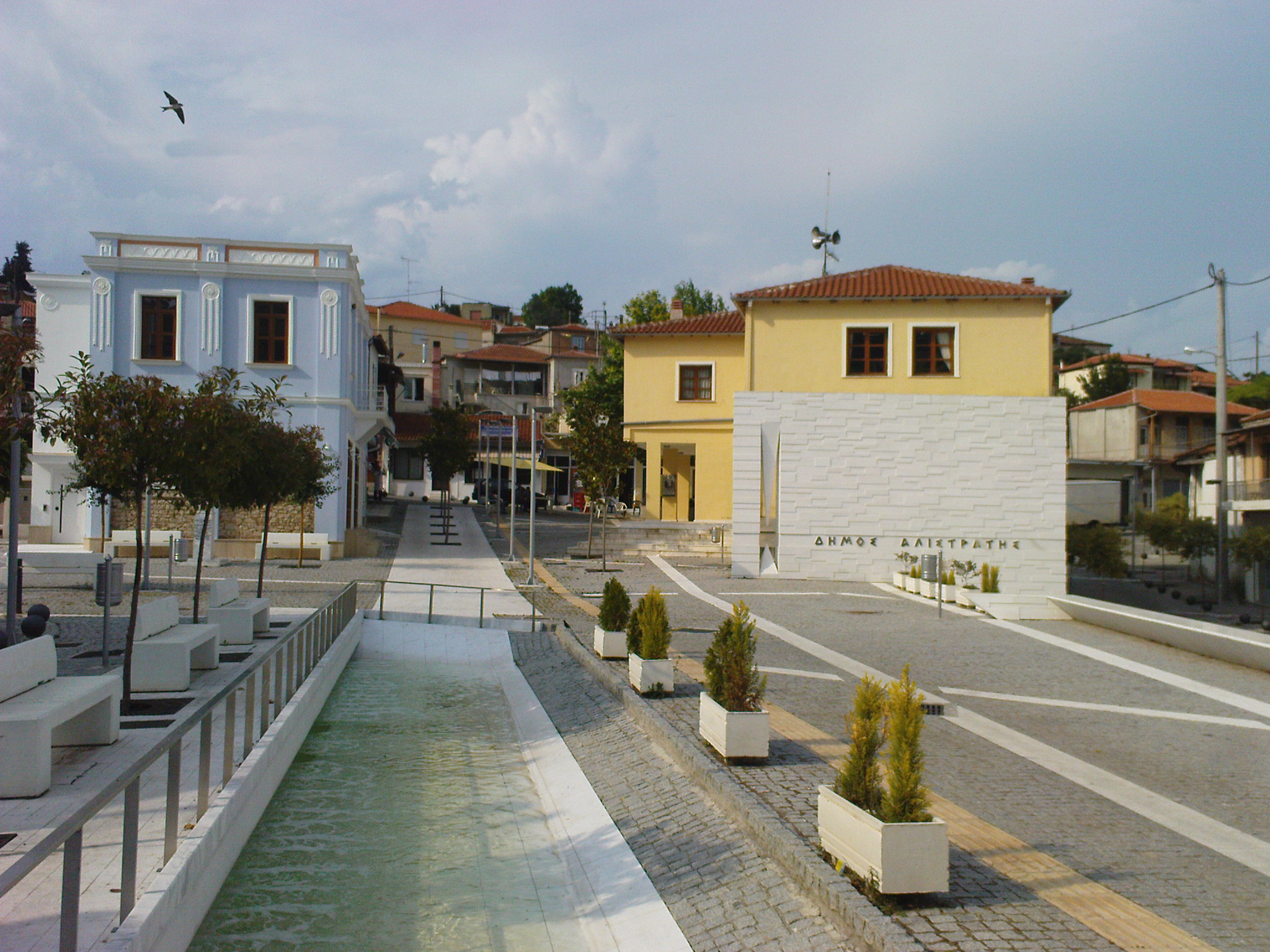
- Alistrati

- Location within the regional unit

- Location within Greece
- Coordinates: 41°01.552′N 24°00.642′E
- Country: Greece
- Administrative region: Central Macedonia
- Regional unit: Serres
- Municipality: Nea Zichni

Area
  - Municipal unit: 129.9 km^{2} (50.2 sq mi)

Population (2021)
  - Municipal unit: 2,312
  - Municipal unit density: 17.80/km^{2} (46.10/sq mi)
  - Community: 1,682
- Time zone: UTC+2 (EET)
  - Summer (DST): UTC+3 (EEST)
- Postal code: 62045
- Vehicle registration: ΕΡ

Alistrati (Greek: Αλιστράτη) is a small town in Serres, situated at the borders of the regional unit of Drama and regional unit of Serres, in the Macedonia region of Greece. It has approximately 1,000 inhabitants, a town hall and a visitable cave. It is 20 km away from Drama and 45 km away from Serres. It is a listed traditional settlement and archaeologists had found something there. Since 2010 Alistrati is part of the municipality New Zichni, of which it is a municipal unit. The municipal unit has an area of 129.878 km^{2}. Alistrati was built like an amphitheatrical inside a fascinating mountain groups on hills of the mountain range Menikio on an altitude of 325m. In Alistrati there exists rising and sloping streets. Sea-winds blowing from Thassos and Staymonikon Bay influence Alistrati day by day. Alistrati, a traditional community one of the biggest of the area Zichni-Fillida. It's been up-graded to municipality of Alistrati with the "Kapodistrias" law and included the villages :Agioxori, Skopia, Mandili, Lefkothea and R.S of Aggista.

== Location and population ==
Alistrati is a former municipality in the Serres regional unit, Greece. Since the 2011 local government reform it is part of the municipality Nea Zichni, of which it is a municipal unit. The municipal unit has an area of 129.878 km^{2}. Population: town 1,682; municipal unit 2,312 (2021). Alistrati is situated at the borders of the regional unit of Drama and regional unit of Serres. It's 20 km away from Drama and 45 km away from Serres. Alistrati was built on hills of the mountain range Menoikio on an altitude of 325 m. It's been up-graded to municipality of Alistrati with the "Kapodistrias" law and included the villages: Agiochori, Skopia, Mandili, Lefkothea and R.S of Aggista. Since 2010, Alistrati is part of Nea Zichni municipality.

In the area of the town a plundered ancient Macedonian tomb has been found, which is undamaged even today, and also the traces of an ancient settlement. Alistrati is mentioned in 1460 in a manuscript of the holy Convent of Ikosifissa Pageo as a small town. A traveler from Turkey mentions it with the name Al-Strati in about 1650. There are many views about the etymology of the word "Alistrati". It is said that it comes from the Archistratigos (Michael - Gabriel).

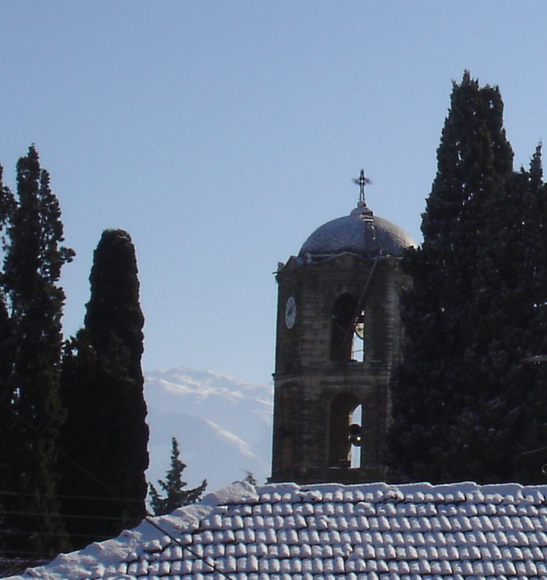
Belfry of Agios Athanasios orthodox church, at Alistrati.

== Alistrati's Caves and Aggitis Ravine ==
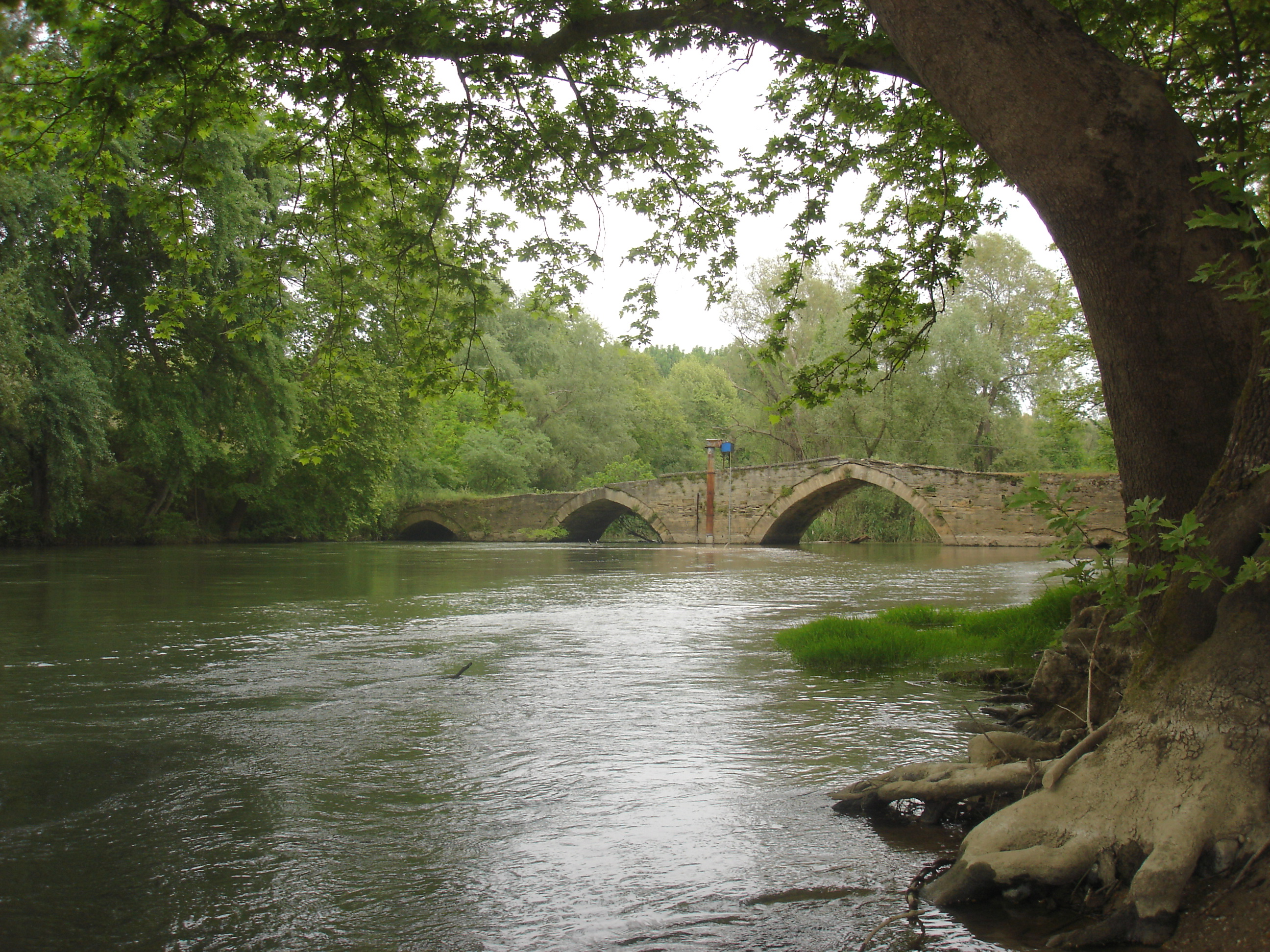
The old bridge of Aggitis River.

According to the Greek Mythology, the Sphinx was appearing near the ravine of Aggitis river in the area of "Petroto". It's also been said that Pluto, master of Hades, when he had kidnapped Persephone, daughter of goddess Demeter led her to the ravine where it's believed that there were the Gates of the Underworld. The specific area which is mentioned in these Greek Myths is the same one near the Alistrati's Caves.

The Alistrati cave lies about 6 km southeast of Alistrati's town at a place called "Petroto". The expanse of the area is almost 14.000m2. The antechamber of the cave is 8 m height. It's from this point that start different high galleries folly decorated with stalactites and stalagmites. The main branches of the cave are developed to the left and to the right of the entrance starting from a huge chamber, the Teception Chamber of a width of 60 m, a length of 100 m and height of 20-30m. It's in this chamber that nature decided to demonstrate its power in creating ornaments. What fascinates the most is the huge stalactites and those pure white forming draperies. There are other chambers and their height is quite the same 8-10m. From the reception chamber and towards the left, emerges a second passage, quite parallel to the first. In this gallery there are even some red stalagmites which are called "The flames". The height of these formations reaches 35 m. Somewhere in this passages the two main passages join each other and continue with an always increasing width and height while from the ceiling one can see suspended huge and majestic stalactites of a height of 15 m.

Inside the cave there are countless floors which are still unknown. Very impressive is the big variety of stalactites and stalagmites inside the cave mostly because of the difference of their shapes and their age. The older stalactites are mainly in the galleries which are on the right side of the entrance. On the other hand, the "infant" stalactites on the left side of entrance.

- Stalactites: They are the limestone tubular formations which are growing from the ceiling and downwards. Their length fluctuates between few centimetres and many metres.
- Stalagmites: They are formed as the water drops, which carry acid carbonate, fall on the ground under a stalactite. When a stalactite meets a stalagmite, we have a new formation which is called "column"
- Helictites: It's a rear kind of stalactite which is developed on the sides, on the floors even on the ceilings of the caves, towards many directions (up, side and down).
- Shields: They are being developed as the water comes out through very thin fissures of the rock. Many times their diameter is of some metres.
- Cave Pearls: They are small formations like spheres
- Gours: They are another kind of formation which is also very interesting. Small barriers of calcium carbonate which are placed on the floor of the cave. The creation depends on the rainfall in the area of the cave. On Gour evolve a rear fauna.
