= Tragilos =

Tragilos Τράγιλος
- Municipal unit
- Location within the regional unit

- Location within Greece
- Coordinates: 40°53′N 23°45′E
- Country: Greece
- Administrative region: Central Macedonia
- Regional unit: Serres
- Municipality: Visaltia

Area
  - Municipal unit: 197.8 km^{2} (76.4 sq mi)

Population (2021)
  - Municipal unit: 3,104
  - Municipal unit density: 15.69/km^{2} (40.64/sq mi)
  - Community: 417
- Time zone: UTC+2 (EET)
  - Summer (DST): UTC+3 (EEST)
- Vehicle registration: ΕΡ

Tragilos (Greek: Τράγιλος, Greek pronunciation: [ˈtraʝilos]) is a former municipality in the Serres regional unit, Greece. Since the 2011 local government reform it is part of the municipality Visaltia, of which it is a municipal unit. The municipal unit has an area of 197.758 km^{2}. Population 3,104 (2021). The seat of the municipality was in Mavrothalassa.
