= Strymonas =

Strymonas Στρυμώνας
- Municipal unit
- Location within the regional unit

- Location within Greece
- Coordinates: 41°01′N 23°37′E
- Country: Greece
- Administrative region: Central Macedonia
- Regional unit: Serres
- Municipality: Emmanouil Pappas

Area
  - Municipal unit: 120.4 km^{2} (46.5 sq mi)

Population (2021)
  - Municipal unit: 5,222
  - Municipal unit density: 43.37/km^{2} (112.3/sq mi)
- Time zone: UTC+2 (EET)
  - Summer (DST): UTC+3 (EEST)
- Vehicle registration: ΕΡ

Strymonas (Greek: Στρυμώνας) is a former municipality in the Serres regional unit, Greece. Since the 2011 local government reform it is part of the municipality Emmanouil Pappas, of which it is a municipal unit. It is named after the river Strymonas. The municipal unit has an area of 120.383 km^{2}. Population 5,222 (2021). The seat of the municipality was in Neos Skopos.
