= Nea Zichni =

Nea Zichni Νέα Ζίχνη
- Municipality
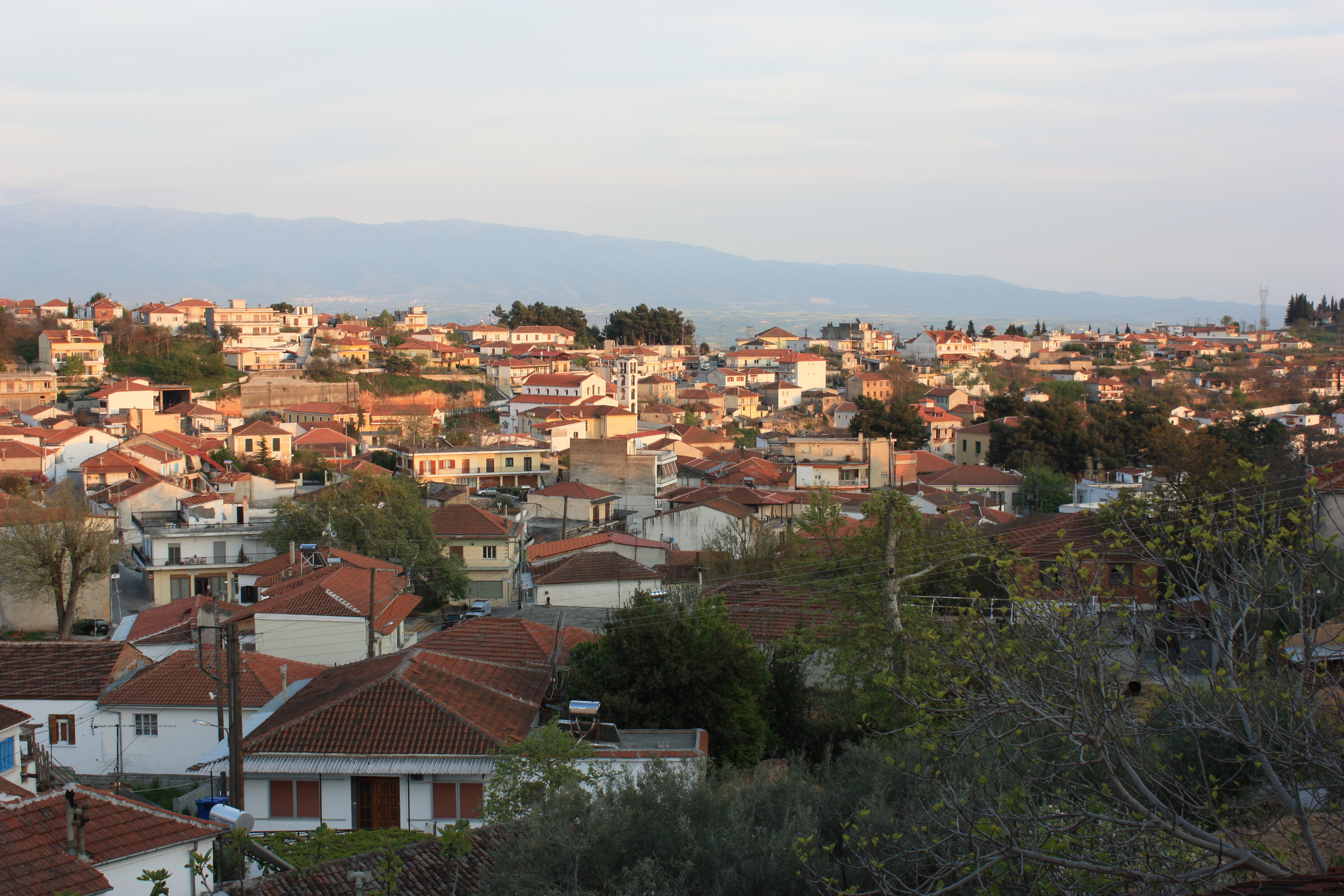

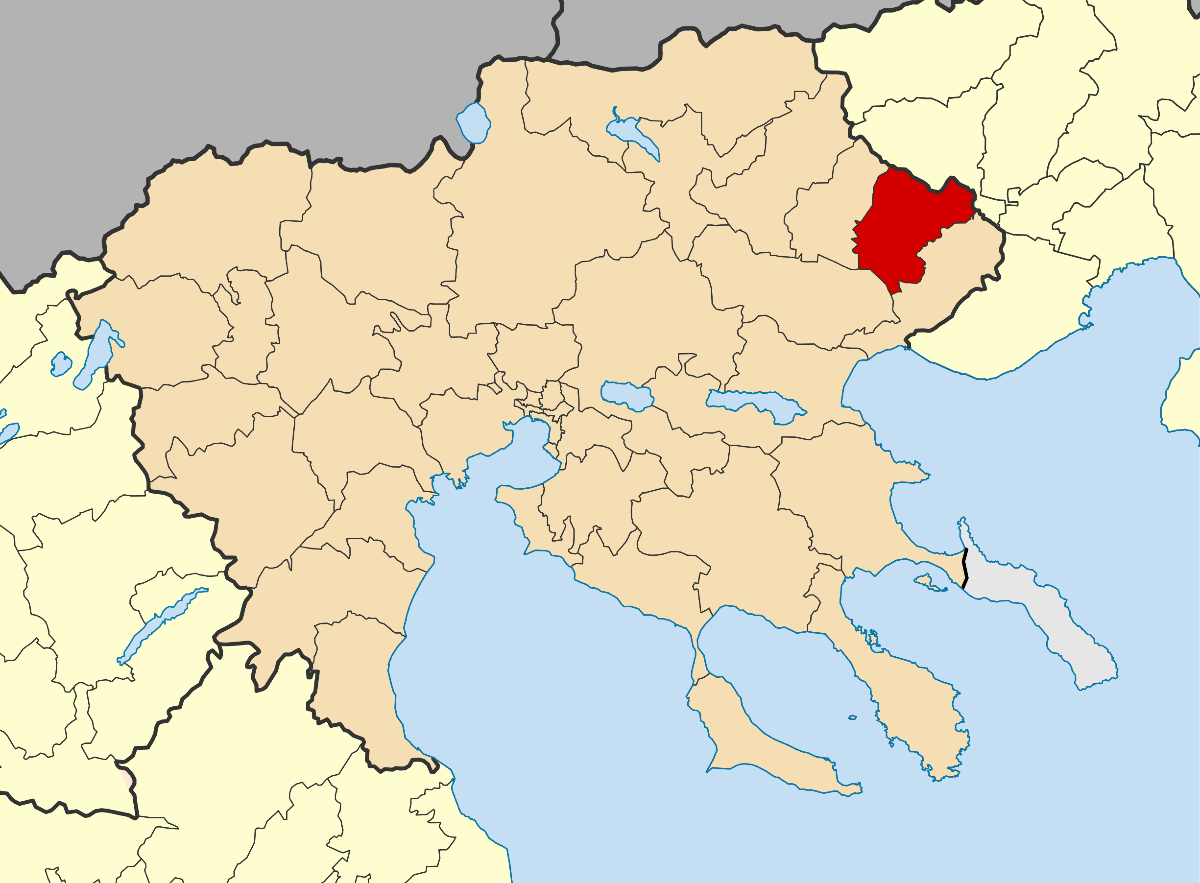

- Location within Greece
- Coordinates: 41°02′N 23°50′E
- Country: Greece
- Administrative region: Central Macedonia
- Regional unit: Serres

Government
  - Mayor: Pantelis Bozis (since 2019)

Area
  - Municipality: 404.3 km^{2} (156.1 sq mi)
  - Municipal unit: 274.4 km^{2} (105.9 sq mi)
- Elevation: 260 m (850 ft)

Population (2021)
  - Municipality: 8,267
  - Density: 20.45/km^{2} (52.96/sq mi)
  - Municipal unit: 5,955
  - Municipal unit density: 21.70/km^{2} (56.21/sq mi)
  - Community: 1,547
- Time zone: UTC+2 (EET)
  - Summer (DST): UTC+3 (EEST)
- Postal code: 62042
- Vehicle registration: ΕΡ
- Website: dimos-neaszixnis.gr

Nea Zichni (Greek: Νέα Ζίχνη) is a municipality in the Serres regional unit, of Central Macedonia region, Greece. Population 8,267 (2021). Nea Zichni is also the name of the administrative seat of the municipality, population 1,547 (2021).

== History ==
The city was originally built next to the marches of Lake Achinos, on the hill of "Toumba" (2 km south of Nea Zichni) and it was called Ichna (Greek: Ίχνα). It was a Paionian city, that was sometime in the 5th or early 4th century BC incorporated into the Macedonian Kingdom. Another city by the same name Ichna is mentioned by Thucydides being next to Pella, by the estuary of the Loudias and Axios rivers. The name Ichna is a Paionian cognate of the Greek word "ichnos" (Greek: ίχνος) which means "stepping ground" a name appropriate for a city built on the sand between the marsh and the lake (or the sea). The original Ichna remained a city throughout the Hellenistic, Roman and Byzantine eras, only to be destroyed and was rebuilt far from the lake in its original position on the hills. In the Ottoman tax registry of 1519 (Hijri 925), it was recorded as Zihne, and the town had 46 Muslim and 419 Christian households, along with 27 Muslim and 73 Christian bachelors and 141 Christian widows; it was a zeamet. In the 19th century it was a kaza centre in the Sanjak of Serres in the Salonica Eyalet.

== Municipality ==
The municipality Nea Zichni was formed at the 2011 local government reform by the merger of the following 2 former municipalities, that became municipal units:

- Alistrati
- Nea Zichni

The municipality has an area of 404.307 km^{2}, the municipal unit 274.429 km^{2}. The municipal unit Nea Zichni consists of the communities Agios Christoforos, Agriani, Anastasia, Dimitra, Draviskos, Gazoros, Mavrolofos, Mesorrachi, Myrkinos, Myrrini, Nea Petra, Nea Zichni, Sfelinos and Tholos.

== Gallery ==
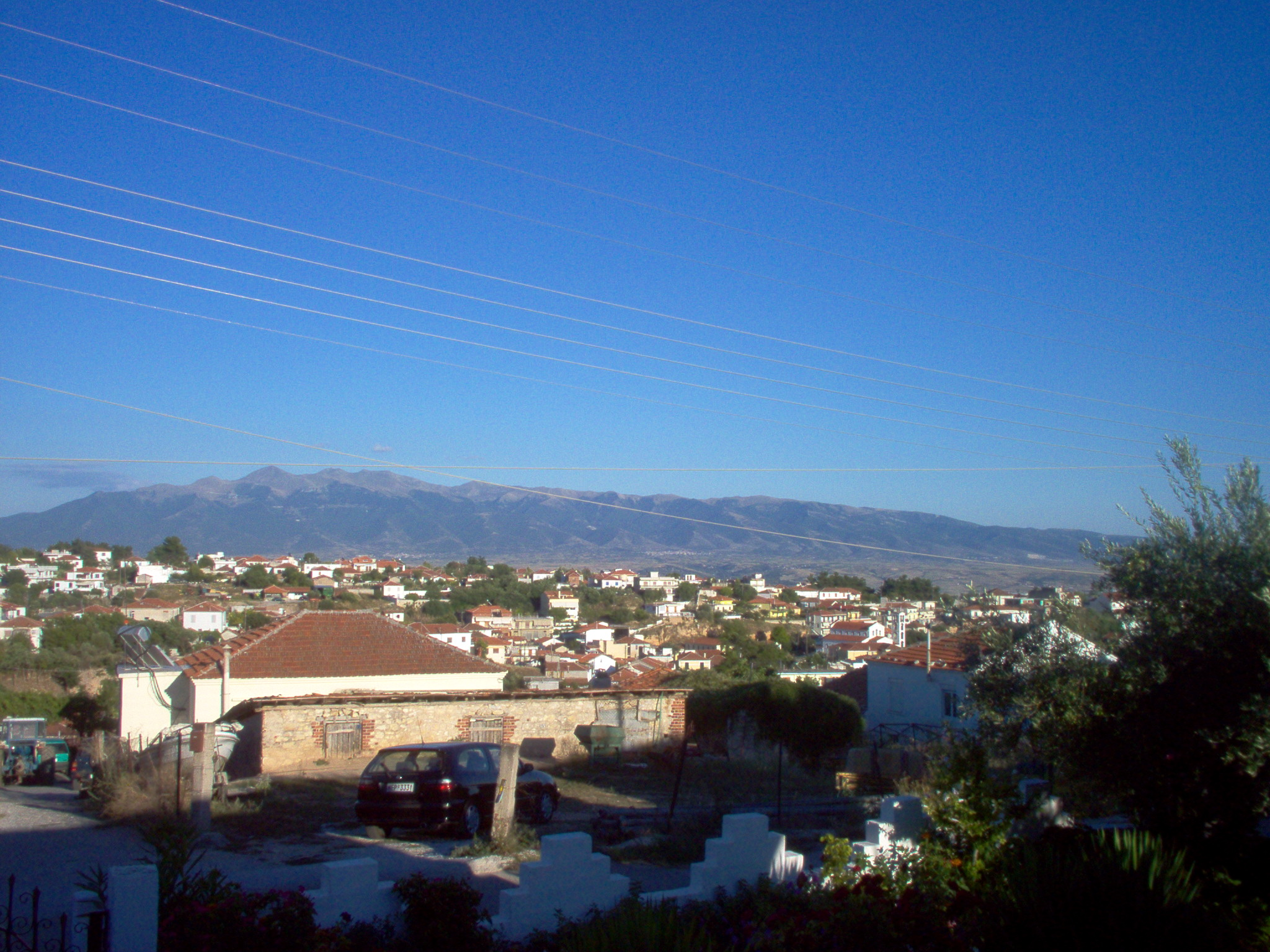
General view of Nea Zichni with Pangaion Mountain behind.

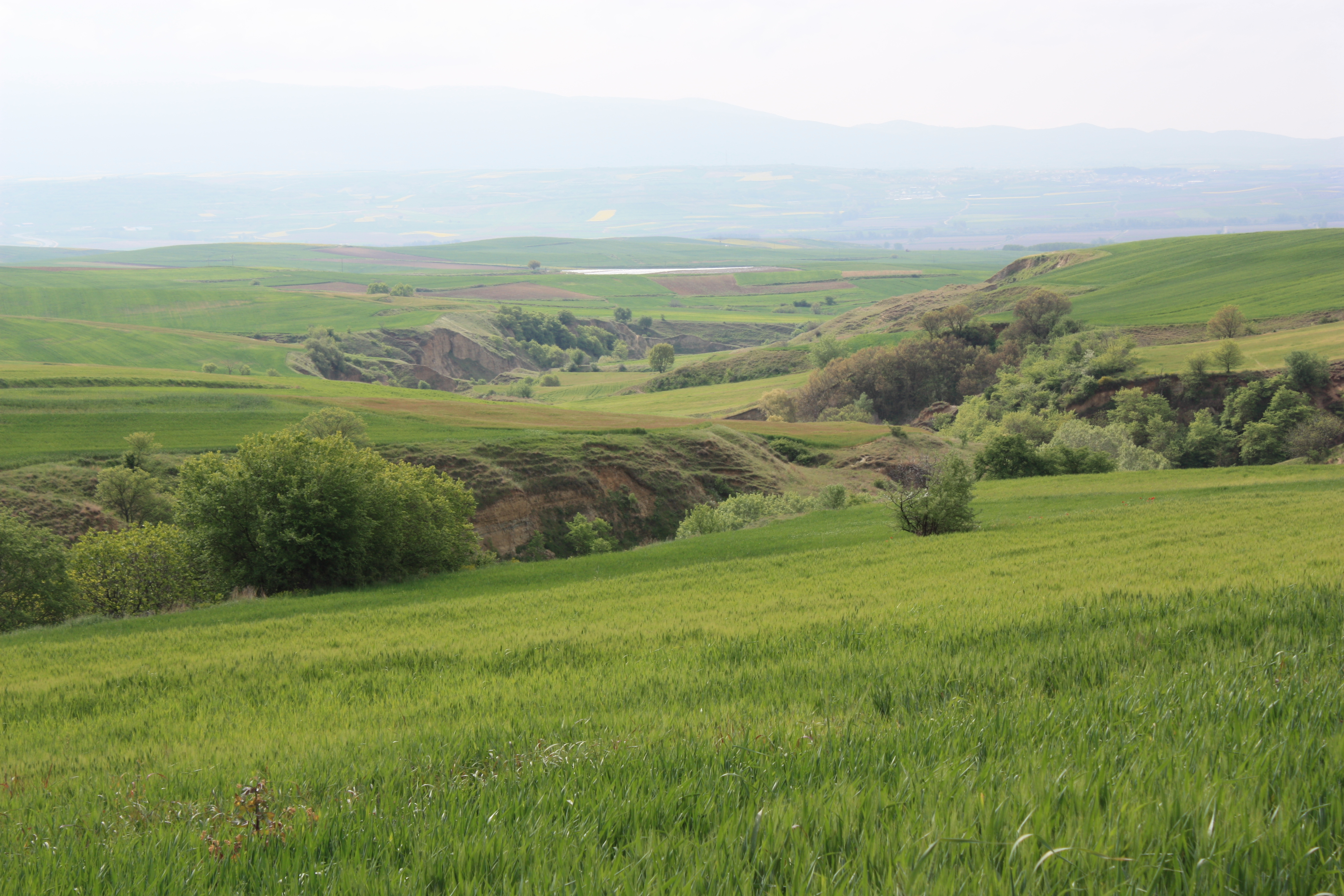
Nea Zichni countryside in Toumba location.

Nea Zichni municipality
