= Irakleia, Serres =

Irakleia Ηράκλεια
- Municipality
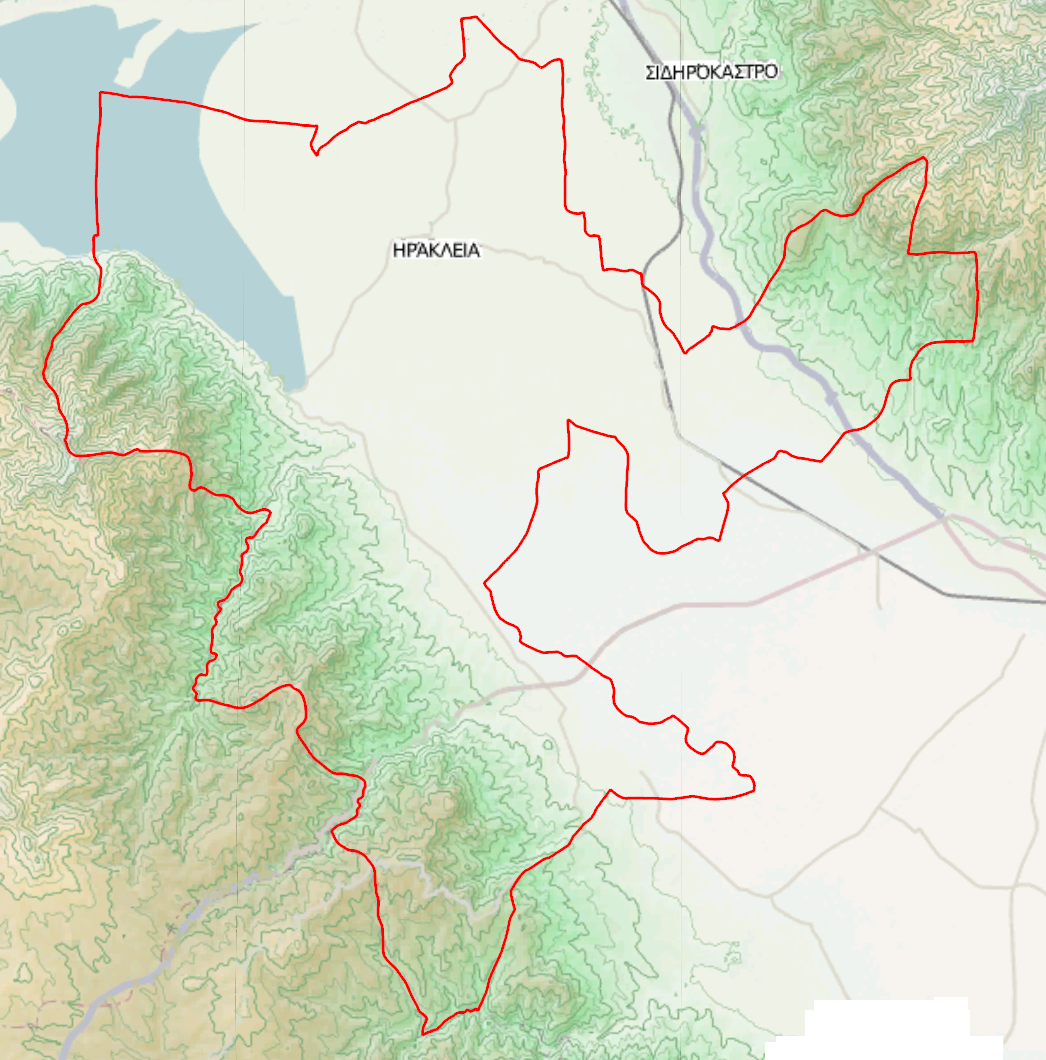

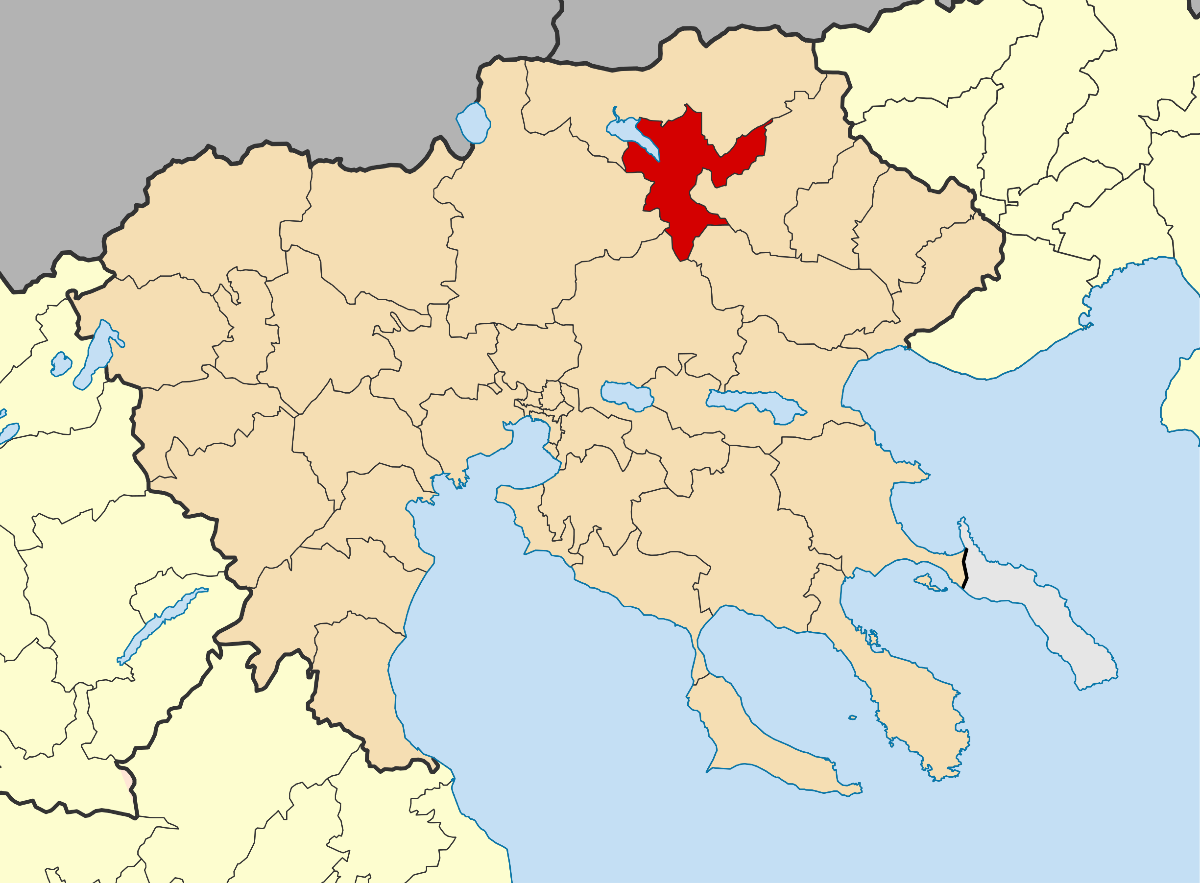

- Location within Greece
- Coordinates: 41°11′N 23°17′E
- Country: Greece
- Administrative region: Central Macedonia
- Regional unit: Serres

Government
  - Mayor: Kleanthis Kotsakiachidis (since 2023)

Area
  - Municipality: 451.5 km^{2} (174.3 sq mi)
  - Municipal unit: 195.2 km^{2} (75.4 sq mi)

Population (2021)
  - Municipality: 15,713
  - Density: 34.80/km^{2} (90.14/sq mi)
  - Municipal unit: 9,946
  - Municipal unit density: 50.95/km^{2} (132.0/sq mi)
  - Community: 3,245
- Time zone: UTC+2 (EET)
  - Summer (DST): UTC+3 (EEST)
- Vehicle registration: ΕΡ
- Website: www.dimosiraklias.gr

Irakleia (Greek: Ηράκλεια, before 1926: Τζουμαγιά - Tzoumagia) is a municipality in the Serres regional unit, Central Macedonia, Greece. Population 21,145 (2011). The seat of the municipality is the town of Irakleia, which was formerly known as "Lower Jumaya" (in Turkish: Barakli Cuma or Cuma-i Zir ("Lower Juma" in Ottoman Turkish); in Bulgarian: Долна Джумая, Dolna Dzhumaya; and in Aromanian: Giumaia di-Nghios). "Upper Dzhumaya" is modern Blagoevgrad, located in Bulgaria. In the Serres area, Aromanians settled in modern Irakleia during Ottoman times. Some Aromanians still live in the city today, with Bulgarian researcher Vasil Kanchov even saying that, as of when he visited the town, the 1250 Aromanians in Irakleia "were the wealthiest of all inhabitants".

== Municipality ==
The municipality Irakleia was formed at the 2011 local government reform by the merger of the following 3 former municipalities, that became municipal units:

- Irakleia
- Skotoussa
- Strymoniko

The municipality has an area of 451.499 km^{2}, and the municipal unit 195.216 km^{2}. The municipal unit of Irakleia consists of the communities Chrysochorafa, Dasochori, Irakleia, Karperi, Koimisi, Limnochori, Lithotopos, Pontismeno and Valtero.
