= Visaltia =

Visaltia Βισαλτία
- Municipality
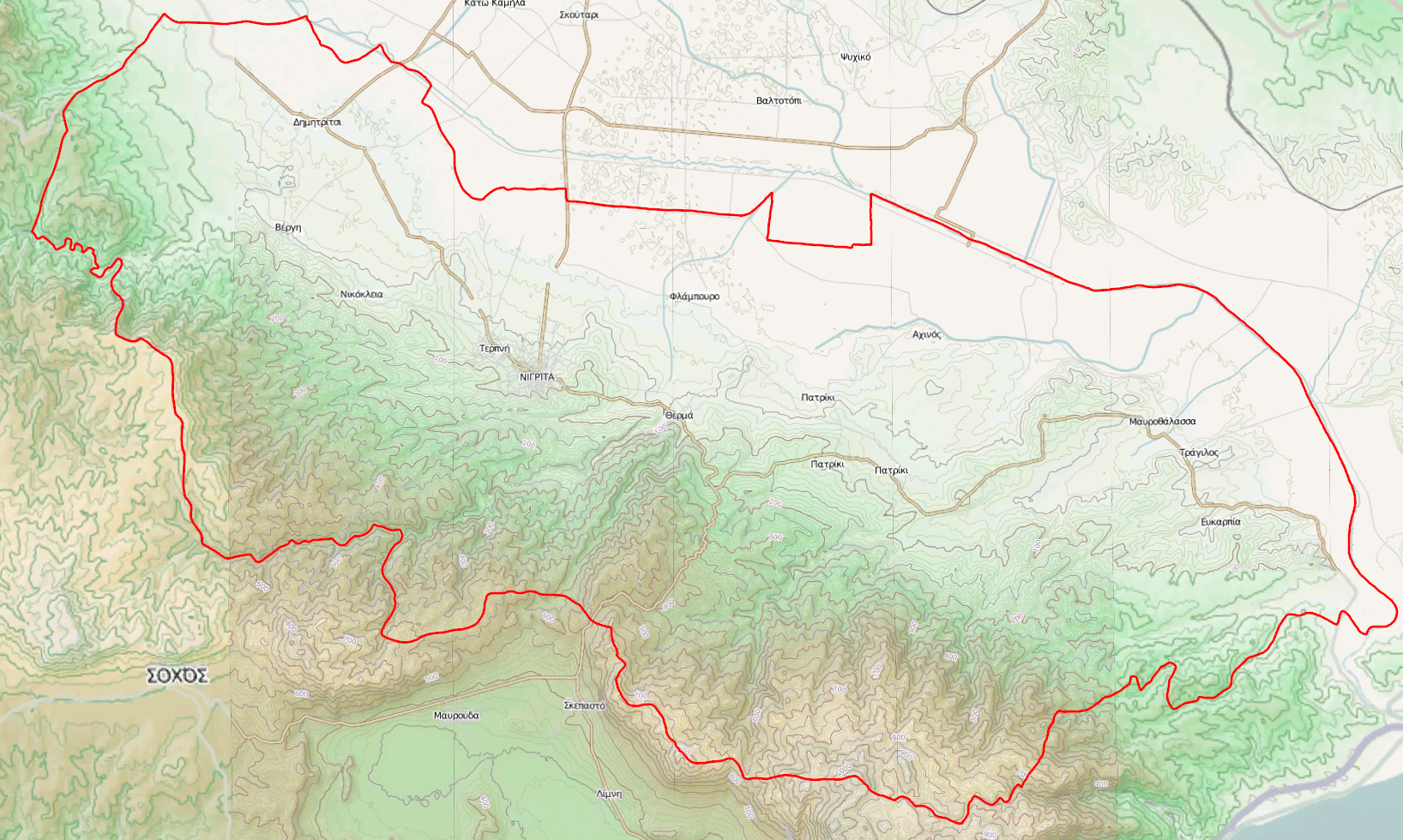

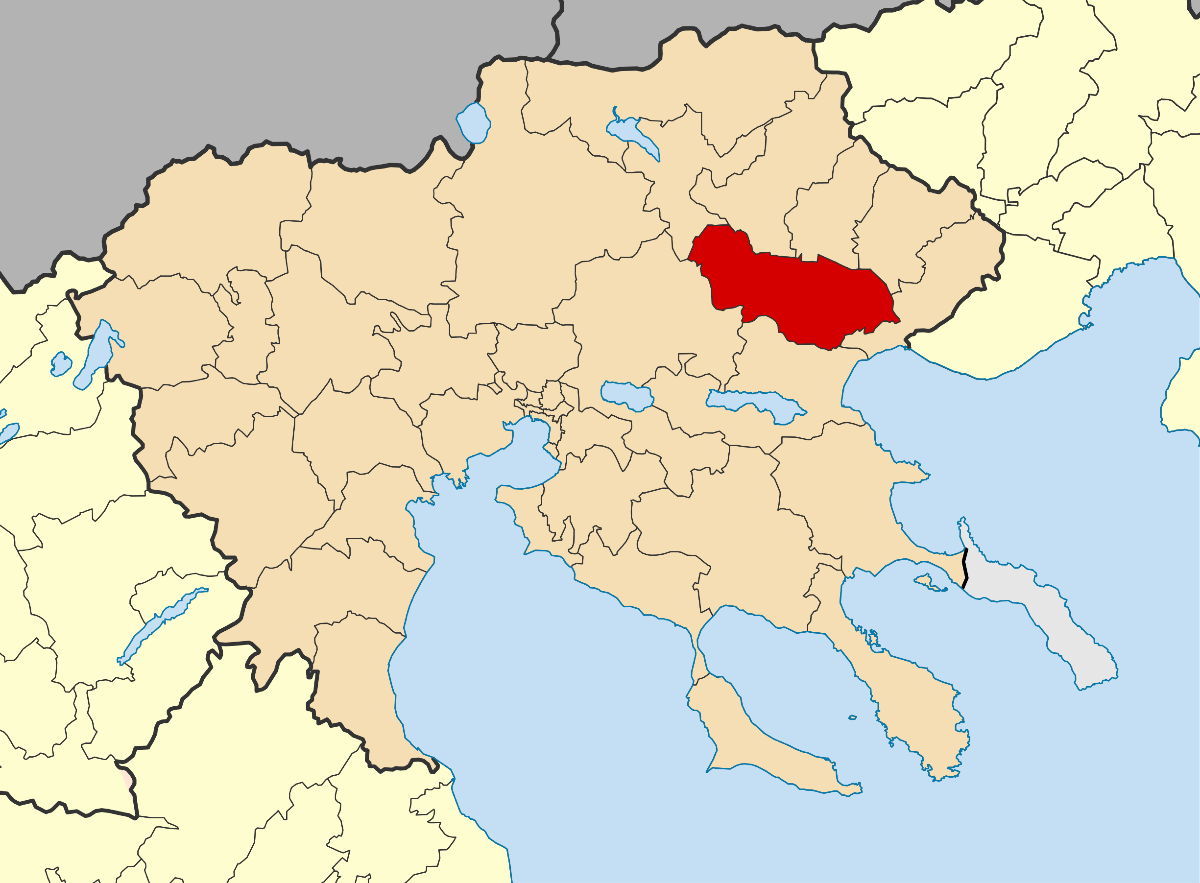

- Location within Greece
- Coordinates: 40°59′N 23°25′E
- Country: Greece
- Administrative region: Central Macedonia
- Regional unit: Serres
- Seat: Nigrita

Government
  - Mayor: Vana Pliakou (since 2024)

Area
  - Municipality: 658.3 km^{2} (254.2 sq mi)
  - Municipal unit: 144.3 km^{2} (55.7 sq mi)

Population (2021)
  - Municipality: 16,036
  - Density: 24.36/km^{2} (63.09/sq mi)
  - Municipal unit: 3,316
  - Municipal unit density: 22.98/km^{2} (59.52/sq mi)
- Time zone: UTC+2 (EET)
  - Summer (DST): UTC+3 (EEST)
- Vehicle registration: ΕΡ
- Website: dimosvisaltias.gr

Visaltia (Greek: Βισαλτία, romanized: Bisaltia, Greek pronunciation: [visalˈti.a]) is a municipality in the Serres regional unit, Greece. The seat of the municipality is in Nigrita.

== Etymology ==
Visaltia is named after Bisaltia, an ancient country and later district of the Kingdom of Macedon that was inhabited by the Bisaltae, a Thracian people ultimately named after Bisaltes, a mythological figure.

== Municipality ==
The municipality Visaltia was formed at the 2011 local government reform by the merger of the following 4 former municipalities, that became municipal units:

- Achinos
- Nigrita
- Tragilos
- Visaltia

The municipality has an area of 658.333 km^{2}, the municipal unit 144.255 km^{2}.

== Province ==
The province of Visaltia (Greek: Επαρχία Βισαλτίας) was one of the provinces of the Serres Prefecture. Its territory corresponded with that of the current municipality Visaltia, and part of the municipal unit Strymoniko. It was abolished in 2006.
