= Serres (regional unit) =

Serres Περιφερειακή ενότητα Σερρών
- Regional unit
- Municipalities of Serres

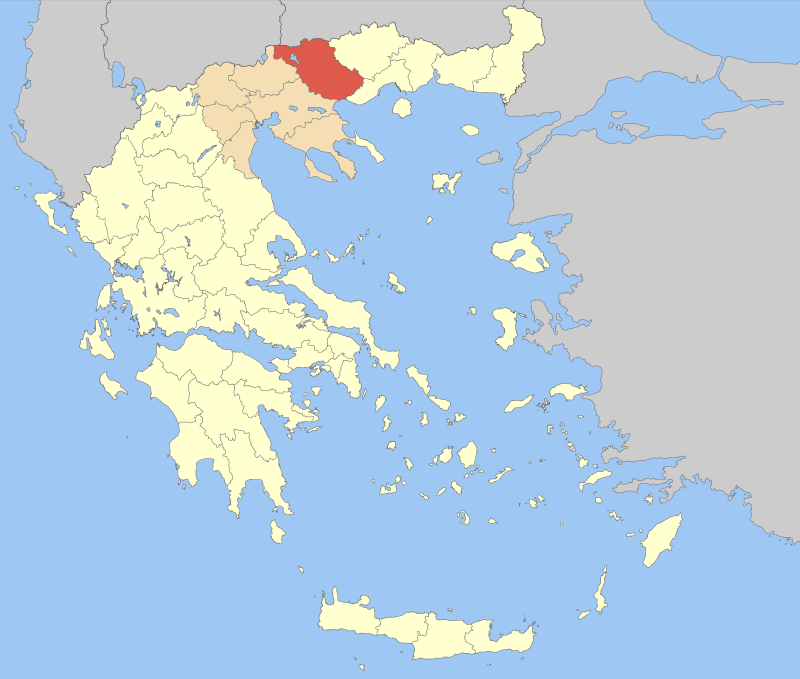
- Serres within Greece

- Location within Greece
- Coordinates: 41°05′N 23°35′E
- Country: Greece
- Administrative region: Central Macedonia
- Seat: Serres

Area
  - Total: 3,968 km^{2} (1,532 sq mi)

Population (2021)
  - Total: 151,317
  - Density: 38.13/km^{2} (98.77/sq mi)
- Time zone: UTC+2 (EET)
  - Summer (DST): UTC+3 (EEST)
- Postal code: 62x xx
- Area code: 232x0
- Vehicle registration: EP
- Website: www.naserron.gr

Serres (Greek: Περιφερειακή ενότητα Σερρών) is one of the regional units of Greece, in the geographic region of Macedonia. It is part of the Region of Central Macedonia. Its capital is the city of Serres. The total population reaches just over 150,000.

== Geography ==
The mountains are Orvelos to the north, Menoikio to the east, Pangaio to the southeast, Kerdylio to the southwest, Vertiskos to the west, parts of Krousi to the west and portions of the Kerkini lies to the northwest. The regional unit borders on Thessaloniki to the southwest, Kilkis to the west, North Macedonia with the Novo Selo Municipality to the northwest, the Blagoevgrad Province of Bulgaria to the north, Drama to the northeast and Kavala to the east. The Strymonian Gulf lies to the south along with the Strymonas delta. Lake Kerkini was a lake located in the southern portion which is now drained. 41% of the regional unit are arable and most of the lands are near the Strymonas river which flows from Bulgaria and empties into the Strymonian Gulf. Another river is the Angitis in the eastern part of the regional unit, with the ravine and caves near Alistrati.

The regional unit has many archaeological and historical features including Serres, Amphipolis, several monasteries, and Metaxa near the border with Bulgaria. The regional unit is also a tourist attraction including Lailia, rich in forests, a skiing resort in the central portion, lake Kerkini which is a reservoir supplying water to the farmlands. Fishing is common within Ano Poroia especially during the summer months and famous Alistrati's caves and the nearby Aggitis ravine.

The southern part around the Strymonas valley has a Mediterranean climate, the rest is predominantly continental with cold winters in higher elevations.

== History ==
In modern times, Serres, like the rest of Macedonia was contested territory between Greece, Bulgaria, Serbia and the Ottoman Empire. After its liberation from the Turks by the Bulgarians in the First Balkan War, Serres became a part of Greece at the end of the Second Balkan War. During the National Schism, it was occupied by Bulgaria again only to form part of Greece at the end of the war. During the Second World War Bulgaria occupied Serres and launched a campaign of Bulgarisation. It was liberated in 1944.

A substantial portion of the population of the regional unit are descendants of refugees which came from Eastern Thrace which is now Northwestern Turkey, Asia Minor and from Pontus during the Greco-Turkish War.

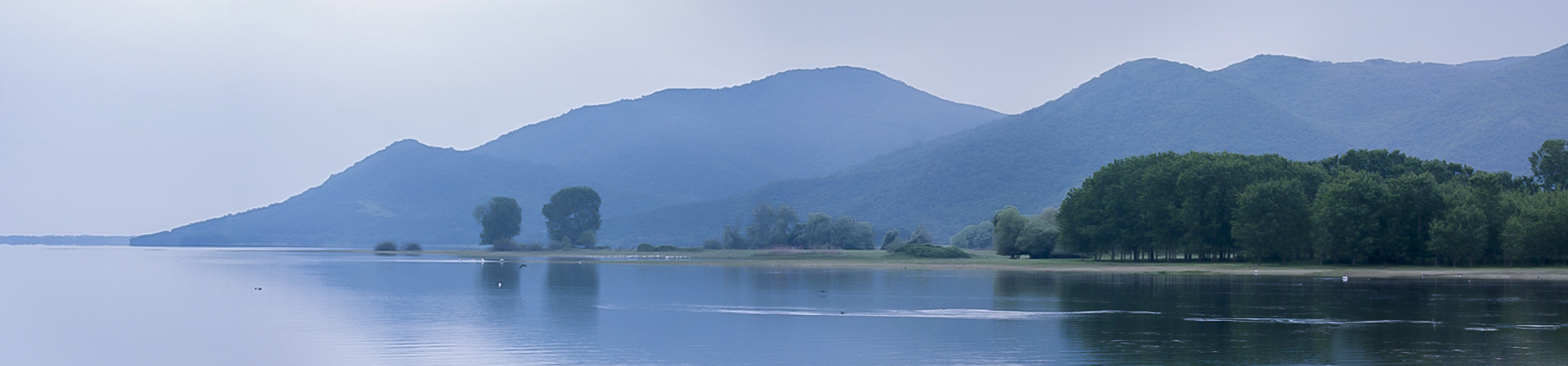
Lake Kerkini

== Administration ==
The regional unit Serres is subdivided into 7 municipalities. These are (number as in the map in the infobox):

- Amfipoli (2)
- Emmanouil Pappas (4)
- Irakleia (5)
- Nea Zichni (6)
- Serres (1)
- Sintiki (7)
- Visaltia (3)

=== Prefecture ===
As a part of the 2011 Kallikratis government reform, the Serres regional unit was created out of the former Serres Prefecture (Greek: Νομός Σερρών). The prefecture had the same territory as the present regional unit. At the same time, the municipalities were reorganised, according to the table below.

New municipality	Old municipalities	Seat
Amfipoli	Amfipoli	Rodolivos
Amfipoli	Kormista	Rodolivos
Amfipoli	Proti	Rodolivos
Amfipoli	Rodolivos	Rodolivos
Emmanouil Pappas	Emmanouil Pappas	Chryso
Emmanouil Pappas	Strymonas	Chryso
Irakleia	Irakleia	Irakleia
Irakleia	Skotoussa	Irakleia
Irakleia	Strymoniko	Irakleia
Nea Zichni	Nea Zichni	Nea Zichni
Nea Zichni	Alistrati	Nea Zichni
Serres	Serres	Serres
Serres	Ano Vrontou	Serres
Serres	Kapetan Mitrousi	Serres
Serres	Lefkonas	Serres
Serres	Oreini	Serres
Serres	Skoutari	Serres
Sintiki	Sidirokastro	Sidirokastro
Sintiki	Agkistro	Sidirokastro
Sintiki	Achladochori	Sidirokastro
Sintiki	Kerkini	Sidirokastro
Sintiki	Petritsi	Sidirokastro
Sintiki	Promachonas	Sidirokastro
Visaltia	Visaltia	Nigrita
Visaltia	Achinos	Nigrita
Visaltia	Nigrita	Nigrita
Visaltia	Tragilos	Nigrita

=== Provinces ===
Before the abolishment of the provinces of Greece in 2006, the Serres prefecture was subdivided into the following provinces:

Province	Seat
Fyllida Province	Nea Zichni
Serres Province	Serres
Sintiki Province	Sidirokastro
Visaltia Province	Nigrita

== Transport ==
The Thessaloniki–Alexandroupolis railway passes through the regional unit, with the Strymon–Kulata railway branching off towards Bulgaria at Strymonas station: other main stations include Serres and Sidirokastro.

The main roads of Serres regional unit are:

- A2 motorway (Egnatia Odos, Igoumenitsa–Thessaloniki–Amfipoli–Alexandroupoli)
- A25 motorway (Thessaloniki–Serres–Sidirokastro–Bulgaria)
- EO2 road (Florina–Thessaloniki–Amfipoli–Alexandroupoli)
- EO12 road (Thessaloniki–Serres–Drama–Kavala)
- EO59 road (Amfipoli–Nea Zichni)
- EO63 road (Serres–Sidirokastro–Bulgaria)
- EO65 road (Thessaloniki–Kilkis–Sidirokastro)

The Amphipolis–Kavala National Road branches off the EO2 just outside the unit, near Ofrynio.

== Persons ==
- Constantine Karamanlis (8 March 1907 in Proti - 23 April 1998), a former Greek prime minister and president
- Emmanouel Pappas, hero of the Greek Independence Struggle
- Glykeria, famous Greek singer (of Asia Minor Hellenic ancestry)
- Ioannis Melissanidis, a Greek gymnast athlete
- Nansy Stergiopoulou, of the all girl band Hi-5, family originally from Serres.

== Sporting teams ==
Panserraikos F.C. association football club, based in Serres, plays in the Super League Greece 2.

== See also ==
- List of settlements in the Serres regional unit
