= Papatsonis family =

Greek family

The Papatsonis family (Greek: Οικογένεια Παπατσώνη) is a Greek family that participated in the Greek War of Independence and the history of modern Greece.

== History ==
=== Before the Revolution ===
In 1735, Stylianos Stoupas arrived in the village of Gidovrysi in the province of Androusa with his wife and three-year-old son, Dimitrios. After three years, the family settled permanently in the village of Naziri, which was renamed Eva in 1927. The village belonged to the estate of the wealthy Ottoman Musa Aga and was then inhabited by 12 families. There, Stylianos Stoupas changed his name to Stylianos Tzonis.

In 1761, his son, Dimitrios Tzonis, was ordained a priest of Naziri and several neighboring villages. Dimitrios was later appointed proestos (community leader with local administrative powers) and came to be known as Papatzonis or Papatsonis (deriving from papás, Greek for priest), creating the official family name. In 1765, he had a son, Anagnostis Papatsonis. One year after fighting in the Orlov Revolt of 1770, which was a precursor to the Greek Revolution of 1821, Dimitrios Papatsonis visited Constantinople where he managed to achieve a sublease agreement for imperial estates of the Sultan's sister. These estates initially included several villages across the provinces of Androusa, Arcadia, Leontari, and Kalamata. These villages were later merged into one single province, the province of Emplakia. After the death of Dimitrios, his son Anagnostis Papatsonis became proestos and was appointed governor of the province of Emplakia in March 1807.

Anagnostis Papatsonis was renowned for his skills and intelligence. A highlight of his five-year tenure as governor of Emplakia was the construction of the Church of the Dormition of the Virgin in the village of Naziri in just 40 days in 1811. In November of the same year, Anagnostis died at the age of 46, poisoned by his rivals. He left three sons, Dimitrios, Panagiotis, and Ioannis, as well as five daughters, the eldest of whom, Anastasia, married Kanellos Deligiannis, one of the leaders of the Greek Revolution in the Peloponnese.

=== During the Revolution ===
Following in his father's footsteps, Dimitrios Papatsonis also became governor of Emplakia and, together with his brothers, was initiated into the Filiki Eteria (Society of Friends). Dimitrios Papatsonis participated in the Greek Revolution, as the leader of a group of over a thousand Messinian fighters, including notable chiefs such as Mitros Petrovas and Panagiotis Kefalas. Dimitrios Papatsonis played a prominent role in the liberation of Kalamata on March 23, 1821. He then fought alongside Theodoros Kolokotronis, Nikitas Stamatelopoulos (Nikitaras), and Dimitris Plapoutas during the siege of Tripolitsa and the Battle of Valtetsi. After the fall of Tripolitsa, he became a senator of the Peloponnesian Senate. When Mahmut Dramali Pasha invaded the Peloponnese, Dimitrios Papatsonis fought in Argolis, in the Battle of Dervenakia, gaining praise for his heroism. In 1824, Dimitrios was imprisoned along with Kolokotronis and other leaders of the Revolution in Hydra. He died in June 1825, aged 27, at the Battle of Trikorfo, after a long battle with the forces of Ibrahim Pasha of Egypt.

Regarding the contribution of Dimitrios Papatsonis to the Greek War of Independence, it is worth noting that when the revolution broke out, the Papatsonis family was one of the most affluent in the Peloponnese. However, this did not stop Dimitrios from relinquishing his privileges, leading a force of 1,000 fighters, and participating in all the major battles of the Peloponnese. The Papatsonis family contributed to the liberation struggle both militarily and financially. It is mentioned that after the liberation of Kalamata, when Kolokotronis was appointed commander of the armed forces that would campaign in Karytaina, Dimitrios Papatsonis offered him a horse, equipment, and one hundred gold coins.

Dimitrios' brother, Panagiotis Papatsonis, was also a member of the Filiki Eteria. After the death of his brother, he became commander of the military force that was under the leadership of Dimitrios. He then participated as a representative in the Third National Assembly at Epidaurus (1826) and the Third National Assembly at Troezen (1827). From June 1827 he was a member of Parliament until its dissolution in January 1828. In 1841, he was elected mayor of Eva, Messinia, a position he held until 1862, while at the same time he was elected member of parliament for Messinia in every electoral contest from 1844 to 1861, except in 1850. After the exile of King Otto, he was not re-elected. He died in his hometown in 1888. His memoirs contain a lot of information about the family and the history of the region, while also describing in detail the Fall of Tripolitsa, the Battle of Valtetsi, and other military operations in which he participated.

=== In the modern Greek state ===
The third brother, Ioannis Papatsonis, was born in 1802. He fought with his brother Dimitrios Papatsonis. After his death, he took over the Messinian army and remained in military service during the governance of Ioannis Kapodistrias. After the constitutional reform, he represented Messinia in parliament. He held the rank of Colonel of the Royal Phalanx, an honorary unit of former Revolutionary fighters, which was established in 1835. He also served as adjutant (1852-1857) to King Otto. Ioannis received both the Silver and the Gold Cross of the Order of the Redeemer, the oldest and the highest decoration awarded by the modern Greek state. He died in 1871

Later notable members of the Papatsonis family include:

- Anagnostis Papatsonis. Politician, National Assembly representative, and Member of Parliament.
- Takis Papatsonis (1895-1976). Greek poet, writer, and academic. Born in Athens to Konstantinos Papatsonis and Aikaterini Prassa, Takis Papatsonis studied political science at the University of Athens. He continued his studies in Economics in Geneva. Some of his early poems were published in the newspaper Akropolis. Takis Papatsonis held senior positions at the Greek Ministry of Finance for more than 40 years, becoming eventually General Secretary. He was also an advisor to the Court of Audits. At the same time, he held prominent positions in the public and private sector, such as Chairman of the Board of the National Gallery (1953-1964), Vice Chairman of the Board of Directors of Emporiki Bank (1941), and Vice Chairman of the Board of the National Theater (1955-1964). He was made Chevalier of the French Legion of Honor (1920), was awarded the Greek State Poetry Prize (1963) and became a member of the Academy of Athens in 1967. Takis Papatsonis married in 1932 and had one daughter, Maria Papatsoni, who married Alexandros Koundouriotis. In 1938 he retired to Mount Athos and lived a monastic life for many months. During his lifetime, he traveled to numerous parts of the world. Among his most notable works are Selection I (1934), Ursa Minor (1944), and Selection II (1962).
