= Pieros Voidis =

Greek revolutionary leader

Pieros Voidis Mavromichalis
- Πιέρος Βοϊδής Μαυρομιχάλης
- Born: 18th century Mavrovouni, East Mani
- Died: 20 May 1825; Maniaki, Messenia
- Cause of death: killed in action
- Occupation: Military personnel
- Relatives: Petros Mavromichalis (cousin)
- Family: Mavromichalides
- Military career
- Allegiance: Maniot Army
- Rank: lieutenant
- Conflicts: Greek War of Independence

Pieros Voidis Mavromichalis (Greek: Πιέρος Βοϊδής Μαυρομιχάλης) was a military leader of the Greek Revolution of 1821. He was born in Mavrovouni of Mani and he was killed in action on 20 May 1825, during the battle of Maniaki between Greek revolutionaries and the Egyptian forces of Ibrahim Pasha.

== Biography ==
Voidis was cousin of Petrobey Mavromichalis and he was considered as one of the most prominent military leaders of Mani, even before the revolution. On 23 March 1821 he took part in the liberation of Kalamata. and shortly after that, Voidis, Petrobey and Mourtzinos offered 270 men to Theodoros Kolokotronis, as he decided to continue towards Arcadia.

A few days later, on 28 March, participated in the battle of Agios Athanasios, in which the rebels tried to prevent the retreat of the Muslims of Fanari to Tripolitsa. During the severe conflict Voidis was injured and was taken away from the battlefield by his men while the battle resulted in a Greek victory and the death of approximately 500 Turks, including many civilians who followed their armed compatriots.

Later, Voidis took part in a series of military operations in Peloponnese, mainly in the region of Argolis. He also managed to become one of the most important lieutenants of Kolokotronis.

In May 1825, Voidis reinforced Papaflessas in Maniaki with 120 men, because of the impending battle against the Egyptian forces of Ibrahim Pasha. He was in charge of the southernmost of the three strongholds. Papaflessas and his brother Dimitrios Dikaios were in charge of the other two. The stronghold defended by Voidis and the other Maniots was the strongest of the three and the last that was seized by enemy forces. In fact, the Greek soldiers that had managed to stay alive from the other two retreated there. However, during the battle, Voidis was killed just like Papaflessas, Dimitrios Dikaios and Panagiotis Kefalas.

== Bibliography ==
- Fotios Chrysanthopoulos [Φώτιος Χρυσανθόπουλος], "Βίοι Πελοποννησίων ανδρών και των έξοθεν εις την Πελοπόννησον ελθόντων κληρικών, στρατιωτικών και πολιτικών των αγωνισαμένων του αγώνα της Επαναστάσεως", Αθήνα, 1888.
- Fotios Chrysanthopoulos [Φώτιος Χρυσανθόπουλος], Βίος του παπά Φλέσα, Εν Αθήναις, 1868.
- Amvrosios Frantzis [Αμβρόσιος Φραντζής], Επιτομή της Ιστορίας της αναγεννηθείσης Ελλάδος αρχομένη από του έτους 1715, και λήγουσα το 1837, Εν Αθήναις, 1841.
- Dionysios Kokkinos [Διονύσιος Κόκκινος], Η Ελληνική Επανάστασις, εκδόσεις Μέλισσα, έκτη έκδοσις, Αθήναι 1974.
- Apostolos E. Vakalopoulos [Απόστολος Ε. Βακαλόπουλος], Ιστορία του Νέου Ελληνισμού, vol. 7 (Ζ'), Θεσσαλονίκη 1986.
