= Emmanouil Pappas (village) =

Emmanouil Pappas Εμμανουήλ Παππάς
- Community
- Location within Greece
- Coordinates: 41°05.08′N 23°42.34′E
- Country: Greece
- Administrative region: Central Macedonia
- Regional unit: Serres
- Municipality: Emmanouil Pappas
- Elevation: 280 m (920 ft)

Population (2021)
  - Community: 475
- Time zone: UTC+2 (EET)
  - Summer (DST): UTC+3 (EEST)

Emmanouil Pappas (Greek: Εμμανουήλ Παππάς) is a village in the Serres regional unit, Greece. Since the 2011 local government reform, it has been part of the municipality of Emmanouil Pappas. It is situated in the foothills of mountain Menoikio, 17 km east of Serres, and 101 km northeast of Thessaloniki. The former name of the village was Dovista (Δοβίστα in standard Greek or Ντουβίστα/Duvista in the local dialect). It was renamed Emmanouil Pappas in 1927, after the hero of the Greek War of Independence in Macedonia who was born there in 1773.

The village is renowned for its traditional Macedonian architecture, characterized by three-story houses and picturesque narrow streets. The main attractions are the building of the old school that was built in 1906 and has been recently restored, the main church of Saint Athanasius, built in 1805 on the same spot where an older church existed, with its magnificent wooden carved iconostasis and the chapels on the surrounding hills.

== History ==
=== The foundation of the village ===
The exact date of the foundation of the village remains unknown, despite the efforts of various local history researchers. It is documented, however, by an Ottoman tax register known as TT3 that there existed in 1454 a small settlement with the same name, Dovista, inhabited by 27 families (which means a possible population of around 100-130 inhabitants back then). Vasilis Kartsios, a researcher descending from Emmanouil Papas and author of various studies on local history, has claimed in his work "Dovista, a post-Byzantine settlement: history of Darnakochoria region with the birthplace of the hero Emmanouil Papas as benchmark" (Δοβίστα, μια υστεροβυζαντινή παροικία: η ιστορία των Δαρνακοχωρίων με σημείο αναφοράς τη γενέτειρα του ήρωα Εμμανουήλ Παπά, 1991) that the village was founded in the mid-17th century by Greek populations of the nearby Byzantine town of Zichna (near modern Nea Zichni), who had fled to the slopes of Mount Menoikio shortly after the Ottoman conquest of the area, remained there for some centuries in order to avoid oppression and arbitrariness of Ottoman authorities and landlords that were very common during the first centuries of Ottoman rule and eventually returned to the lowlands and founded new settlements only when Ottoman administration became less harsh. This hypothesis, however, is not supported after the discovery of TT3, at least in regards to the foundation date, while it cannot be excluded that the village pre-existed the Ottoman conquest of Serres and the vicinity, which happened in 1383.

=== Testimonies of 19th century travellers ===
In the next centuries the population of the village increased significantly and during the second half of the 19th century Dovista is described by various travellers, both Greeks and non-Greeks as a thriving big Greek village with a population of nearly or over 1,000 inhabitants. For instance, Vasilios Nikolaidis wrote in 1859 on Dovista in his Francophone book "Les Turcs et la Turquie contemporaine" (The Turks and contemporary Turkey, vol. 1, page 164):

"Nous nous dirigeons a l' est, pendant une heure; nous foulons un sol assez egal et nous atteignons le village de Douvista, compose de cent cinquante maisons grecques." (We head toward east, for an hour. We walk on a rather level ground and reach the village Douvista, which consists of 150 Greek houses).

The French geographer and professor of the Ottoman High School of Galata Saray in Istanbul Alexandre Synvet mentions Dovista (misspelled as "Dobitza") with 2,320 Greek inhabitants in 1878, in page 43 of his work "Les Grecs de l’Empire Ottoman. Etude Statistique et Ethnographique" (The Greeks of the Ottoman Empire. Statistical and ethnographic study).

Bulgarian Metodi Kusev (Методий Кусев), Exarchist Bishop of Stara Zagora, whose descent was from Ohrid, mentioned Dovista (as "Douvischta") with 212 families and 600 Greek inhabitants in page 28 of his Francophone book Ethnographie des Vilayets d'Andrinople, de Monastir et de Salonique (Ethnography of the Vilayets of Adrianople, Monastir and Salonica, 1878).

The major of the engineer corps of the Greek army Nikolaos Schinas (Νικόλαος Σχινάς) wrote in page 444 of his work "Travelling notes on Macedonia, Epirus, the new borderline and Thessaly, vol. 2" (1886) (Οδοιπορικαί σημειώσεις Μακεδονίας, Ηπείρου, νέας οροθετικής γραμμής και Θεσσαλίας, B τόμος):

"To the north of it and in the same foothills of Mount Menoikio, lies in a distance of 1/2 hour the village Dovista, with around 150 Christian families, church and schools for both boys and girls". (Αρκτικώς τούτου κείται επί των αυτών υπωρειών του Μενοικίου όρους και εις απόστασιν 1/2 ώρας το χωρίον Ντοβίστα, έχον περί τας 150 οικογενείας χριστιανικάς, εκκλησίαν και σχολεία αρρένων και θηλέων).

The Serb Spiridon Gopčević (Спиридон Гопчевић), a leading figure of Serbian propaganda in Macedonia, mentioned Dovista (as "Duvišta") with 232 houses and 600 Greek tax-paying inhabitants (only adult males or widows that were family leaders due to lack of adult males were considered as tax payers by the Ottoman authorities, so the real population must have been much bigger than the number of tax payers), in page 380 of his work "Makedonien und Alt-Serbien" (Macedonia and Old Serbia, 1889)

The Bulgarian historian Georgi Strezov (Георги Стрезов) whose descent was from Ohrid wrote on Dovista in page 30 of his work "Два санджака от Източна Македония" (Two Sanjaks of East Macedonia, 1889)

"Dovista, big village to the east of Serres, in the foothills of Boz Dag (Menoikio). Three hours distance (from the city), the road is good and on level ground. The inhabitants of this village are industrious and clever enough, however they don't have too much arable land and therefore they go for work to other villages. In Dovista they grow wheat, vineyards, cotton and tobacco. There is a Greek church and Greek school. 230 houses and 1,100 Darnakes inhabitants."

(Довища, голямо село на И от Сяр при полите на Боздаг. Пътят 3 часа е добър и прав. Жителите на това село са доста разбудени; нямайки достатъчно земя за обработване, отиват по другите села на работа. В Довище се обработват жита, грозде, памук и тютюн. Има гръцка църква и гръцко училище. 230 къщи с 1100 жители дърнаци.)

The term "Darnakes", mentioned in the above excerpt by the Bulgarian author in its slavicized form "Darnatsi/дърнаци", is a name that the inhabitants of Dovista and the neighbouring villages (the so-called "Darnakochoria", villages of the Darnakes) use as a kind of "tribal" name. According to what the renowned Serb geographer Jovan Cvijić (Јован Цвијић) wrote in page 521 of his work "Основе за географију и геологију Македоније и Старе Србије" (Basic principles of Geography and Geology of Macedonia and Old Serbia, 1906):

"It is interesting that the Greek populations between Serres and Ziliachova (modern Nea Zichni) are called Darnaci (Darnakes) by the Slavs. It seems that Macedonian Greeks have no other tribal name".

Интересантно је да Словени зову грчко становништво између Сереза и Зиљахова дарнацима; иначе изгледа да македонски Грци немају других имена осим народнога.

Also the Bulgarian Vasil Kanchov (Васил Кънчов), chief inspector of the Bulgarian schools of Macedonia and Minister of Education later, who provided a detailed list of all the inhabited places of Macedonia with ethnographic and religious data in his work "Македония: етнография и статистика" (Macedonia, ethnography and statistics, 1900), wrote in page 73 in regards to Darnakes and Darnakochoria:

"The Greek villages around Serres are: Tipoliani (modern Chryso), Zili (evacuated after the Balkan wars, doesn't exist today), Tumba, Sarmusakli (modern Pendapoli), Dovista (modern Emmanouil Papas), Patriki, Soubaskioyϊ (modern Neo Souli), Vezniko (modern Aghio Pnevma) and Sokol (modern Sykia). There are few Konyar Turks in the last two. The population of these villages is called Darnakes (Darnaci). They are the remnants of an old Greek colony without Bulgarian admixture. Although the Darnakes are surrounded by Bulgarian villages, they don't know not even a single Bulgarian word and their relations with the other villages are very limited. Mixed marriages are not practised. Darnakes are industrious farmers and grow cotton, while they also have good vineyards. Based on some local traditions, Verkovich believes that Darnakes have migrated in that region from Thebes. According to Greek philologists, the name Darnakes derives from the word "dare"(δάρε) which these villagers pronounce instead of standard Greek "tora" (τώρα=now).

"Гръцки села около Сяр са Тополен, Зили, Тумба, Сармуксали, Довища, Патрик, Субаш Кьой, Везник и Сокол. В двете последни има и малко турци коняри. Населението на тия села се нарича дарнаци. Това са останки от стара гръцка колония без български примес. Дарнаците ако и да са обиколени с български села, не знаят дума българска и сношенията между тях и околните села са много ограничени. Смесени бракове не стават. Дарнаците са прилежни земеделци, работят памук и имат добри лозя. Като се основава върху някои местни предания Веркович вярва, че дарнаците са преселени от Тива. Според тълкуванието на гръцки филолози името дарнаци произлиза от думата δάρε, която тия селяни употребяват вместо τώρα (сега)"

In page 177 of the same book, Kanchov mentions Dovista with 1,500 Christian Greek inhabitants (Kanchov followed the usual Bulgarian tactic of using the native language of Macedonian populations as only criterion to determine their ethnic belonging, as opposed to Ottoman authorities that used in their censuses religion for that purpose).

The Bulgarian D. M. Brancoff (pen name of Dimitar Mishev, secretary of the Bulgarian Exarchate) mentions Dovista (as "Dovichta") with 1400 Greek inhabitants in page 200 of his work "La Macédoine et sa population chrétienne" (Macedonia and its Christian population, 1903).

=== Life and social structure in Ottoman time ===
During Ottoman time, the population of the village was organized according to the typical Greek communal institutions system that already existed in Byzantine time. This is documented in the "Codex" (a kind of archive held by Greek Orthodox churches in the past) of the main church of the village, dedicated to Saint Athanasius (Άγιος Αθανάσιος). In the mid 19th century there existed in Dovista a kindergarten and two separate Greek elementary schools for boys and girls. In 1885, the public assembly of the village population decided that a new school building should be erected because the old one lacked space and could barely host the continuously increasing number of pupils. The erection of the new building was to be funded by compulsory contributions of the inhabitants, that would be credited through the tobacco sales, which was already back then the main crop of the area. The relevant agreement goes as follows:

Each of us villagers growing tobacco, irrespectively of whether he signs the present document or not, is obligated to leave to the merchant who buys his crop, irrespectively of its quality, ten paras for each oka and this should be noted by the purchaser in his ledger. The amount to be thus withheld by the merchant should be in hard currency, that is a lira of 108=one hundred and eight.

The construction was completed in 1906. It is a neoclassical building which still decorates the place near the church of Saint Athanasius, bearing the inscription "ΕΚΠΑΙΔΕΥΤΗΡΙΑ ΕΛΛΗΝΙΚΗΣ ΟΡΘΟΔΟΞΟΥ ΚΟΙΝΟΤΗΤΟΣ ΔΟΒΙΣΤΗΣ 1906" (School of the Greek Orthodox community of Dovista). It was restored in the middle of the first decade of 2000 and today the ground floor serves as museum about the life and activity of the hero Emmanouel Pappas, while the first floor hosts occasionally Municipal Council meetings and other events.

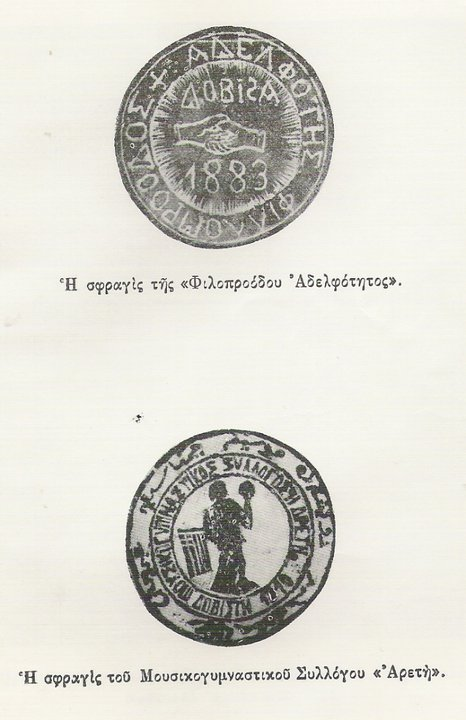
The seals of the "Progressive Fraternity Dovista" (founded in 1883) and the "Music-Gymnastics Society Virtue" (founded in 1910). The existence of the Greek flag in the second seal, despite the fact that the village was still under Ottoman rule back then, is remarkable

The decision to build a new school building was certainly associated with a significant spiritual and cultural flowering that occurred at the same time, which also led to the founding of various associations with social and educational activities and national guidelines. In late 19th-early 20th century, there existed in the village three such associations: the "Fraternity of Saint Demetrius" (Αδελφότης Αγίου Δημητρίου), which built a homonymous church in 1862, the "Progressive Fraternity Dovista" (Φιλοπρόοδος Αδελφότης Δοβίστα), founded in 1883 and the "Music-Gymnastics Society Virtue" (Μουσικογυμναστικός Σύλλογος Αρετή), founded in 1910. In the first years after the liberation of the area from Ottoman yoke and its incorporation to the Greek state, there was also founded the "Music-Gymnastics Club Emmanouil Papas" (Μουσικογυμναστικός Σύλλογος Εμμανουήλ Παπάς), whose board published a short-lived magazine titled "Emmanouil Papas" in 1932.

=== Greek War of Independence (1821) ===
The leader of the Greek revolution in Chalkidiki, Emmanouel Pappas, was born at Dovista in 1773. Many villagers were initiated into his secret revolutionary plans and were ready to fight in the coming revolution. According to local tradition, the Pappas' family house was used for storing weapons and ammunition which were first landed at the harbor of Tsayezi (close to modern Nea Kerdyllia and ancient Amphipolis) on the Strymonian Gulf and then transported to Dovista through the (drained since 1938) Lake Tachinos (named after the nearby village of Achinos), whose northernmost shores lie around 16–17 km from Dovista. With the outbreak of the revolution, many recruited fellow villagers of Pappas followed him to Chalkidiki. Many were killed in the battles there, while the survivors followed Pappas in his departure from Mount Athos after the Ottoman suppression of the revolution in Macedonia and continued the struggle in southern Greece, fighting under the commands of Emmanouel Papas' son Ioannis, who later fell in the battle of Maniaki, alongside Papaflessas.

=== Macedonian Struggle ===
The people of Emmanouil Pappas were present in the Macedonian Struggle as well, since many of them were initiated by the Hellenic Macedonian Committee (Ελληνομακεδονικόν Κομιτάτο) and took an active part, either as members of guerilla bands (andartes or "Makedonomachoi"-literally "Macedonian fighters" ), or transporting weapons and ammunition (following the known from 1821 route Tsayezi-Dovista through lake Tachinos) or serving in other posts. The presence of people from Dovista in armed bands that were active even as far as the soil of modern Bulgaria is documented in a telegram, sent on October 12, 1878, by the consul of Greece in Serres Ioannis Papakostopoulos to the Prime Minister Theodoros Deligiannis:

"In Kiz-Dervent, in the region of Razlog, eight insurgents, mostly from the Greek villages and with a Greek from Dovista as their leader, a village in a distance of two hours from Serres, seized the straits, attacked and robbed a company of 30 Turkish men, women and children. They only killed a Bey among them who resisted and didn't harass at all the women. They picked out 10 loads of spoils and took them on horses that belonged to the robbed company."

(Εν Κιζ Δερβενίω, εν τω διαμερίσματι Ραζλοκίω, οκτώ λησταντάρται κατά μέγα μέρος εκ των ελληνικών χωρίων, και υπό αρχηγόν Έλληνα τινά εκ Δοβίστης, χωρίον δύο ώρας εντεύθεν απέχοντος, καταλαβόντες τα στενά του δερβενίου προσέβαλον και ελήστευσαν συνοδείαν 30 Τούρκων ανδρών και γυναικοπαίδων. Εφόνευσαν μόνον έναν βέην μεταξύ αυτών αντιστάντα, ουδόλως δε ηνώχλησαν τας γυναίκας. Δέκα φορτία λαφύρων, ληφθέντων κατ' εκλογήν, απήγαγον επί ίππων ανηκόντων εις την ληστευθείσαν συνοδείαν).

Some years later, around 1904, the first agents of the Hellenic Macedonian Committee appeared in Dovista, usually disguised as pedlars, who came in contact with the inhabitants of the village and tried to ascertain what were their beliefs and ethnic sentiments. Thus, under the guidance of the Greek consulate of Serres, an action committee was set up in the village with president the physician Parrisios Panou and members Christos Ravanis, Georgios Birbilis, Constantinos Dikos, Ioannis Michalakis and Georgios Besios. Main task of this committee was the transportation of weapons and ammunition from the Strymonian Gulf, the hosting of members of Greek guerrilla bands in various houses of the village whenever it was necessary and also to provide info to the Greek consulate of Serres about suspicious movements in neighbouring Bulgarian villages. Other inhabitants of the village who assisted the committee were Vasilios Psitis, Athanasios Pyrgos, Ioannis Spandonis, Nikolaos Tsiapos, Theodosis Gontotsios and Georgios Pantotis, who were engaged in storing the weapons, while Christos Sitis, Christos Chatzieleftheriou and Evangelos Chatzieleftheriou served as messengers and were also responsible for the distribution of weapons in the neighbouring villages. Of the above-mentioned, Pyrgos, Spandonis and Pantotis constructed rifle cartridges. Also Michalis Tsiapos joined the guerrilla band of Kapetan Doukas, after having killed a Turk from the neighbouring village of Sokol (modern Sykia) for insulting the Christian faith. On June 13, 1905, a Greek band consisting of 8 men was arrested by an Ottoman detachment, along with 9 Gras rifles and 400 cartridges, according to a telegram of the British consul of Serres Ioannis Theodoridis to the British General Consul of Salonica Robert Graves. According to narrations of elderly inhabitants, some days before their arrest the guerrillas were hiding in the nearby hill of Saint Demetrius, and their rifles were hidden in the belfry of the homonymous church. However, their presence was noticed by bypassing inhabitants of the neighbouring Bulgarian village Moukliani (Мъклен/Mklen in Bulgarian), 8 km to the north, on the slopes of Mount Menoikio, who denounced them to the Ottoman authorities. So, when the guerrillas went to the village for provisions they were suddenly surrounded by Ottoman soldiers. Whenever they went to the village, they were dressed in local costumes in order to avoid to arouse suspicions. However, their brand new costumes didn't seem to fit with their answer to the inquiries of the Ottoman soldiers that they were workers in a local tobacco warehouse. They were arrested and after cruel tortures revealed the truth.

On July 14, 1907, a Greek band consisting mainly of inhabitants of Dovista and the other Greek villages of the vicinity and with Andreas Makoulis from Stenimaka (Στενήμαχος/Stenimachos in Greek) as chief, which was hosted in Dovista, in the house of the notable Nasios Mamiakas, was accidentally discovered (because of a quarrel between its members that ended up with the whole band pursuing with shots an undisciplined guerrilla who was bound but managed to escape running to the tobacco fields) by two strong detachments of Ottoman mounted gendarmes, that passed outside the village on their way to Serres, in order to participate in a battle against another Greek band there, that of Kapetan Mitrousis, which was trapped in the belfry of the church of Aghia Evangelistria and fought an uneven battle against the whole Ottoman military forces of the town and the nearby villages.

The guerrillas abandoned hastily the village and moved to Mount Menoikio, hoping to escape through its inaccessible gorges and ravines. They tried to make their way through a narrow gorge called "Ayiasma", however, they were soon surrounded from all sides, since the Ottoman detachments were assisted by armed inhabitants of the nearby Turkish village of Sokol and by the gendarmes of the Bulgarian village Mukliani, 7–8 km to the north and on the slopes of Mount Menoikio. Those were accompanied by many armed inhabitants of the above-mentioned village, who were at odds with the people of Dovista and the other Greek villages of the vicinity. In the long-lasting battle that followed until sunset, all Greek guerrillas were killed save one, who managed to return to the village in the night. He found shelter in a house and next day he was sent away, disguised as woman. Andreas Makoulis was heavily injured and captured alive by the Ottomans. They took him at their headquarters in the nearby village of Sarmousakli (modern Pendapoli) in order to interrogate him if he would recover, however he died the next day. The Turkish losses were around 25 dead who were buried in the neighbouring Turkish village Sokol.

The names of the guerrillas of Andreas Makoulis' band were: Andreas Makoulis, chief of the band, from Stenimaka of Eastern Rumelia (modern Asenovgrad in Bulgaria); Theodosis Godotsios or Bouboumis from Dovista, second in command (he was arrested by the Turks before the battle and imprisoned in Pontus. He was released few years later, with the general amnesty that was proclaimed by the Young Turks; Evangelos Chatzieleftheriou, from Dovista; Vasilios Psitis, from Dovista; Anastasios Abliamis, from Dovista; Nikolaos Tsiapos, from Dovista; Nikolaos Achiniotis, from Achinos, Serres; Sotirios Siosios, from Subaskioy (modern Neo Souli, Serres); Chrysafis Patramanis (the only survivor), from Subaskioy; Ioannis Stenimachiotis, from Stenimaka; Ilias Karlikioylis, from Karlikioy (modern Chionochori, Serres); Christos Frastanlis, from Frastani (modern Oreini, Serres); Andonis Nouskalis, from Kato Nuska (modern Dafnoudi, Serres).

In the following days, all notables and 120 other inhabitants of Dovista were arrested by the Ottoman authorities and brought to Serres for interrogation. 80 of them were sent to the prisons of Yedi Kule in Thessaloniki, where they remained for three months. Eventually, only those that hosted the guerrillas in their homes were found guilty: Konstantinos Dikos (mukhtar of the village), Fotios Mamiakas, Athanasios Mamiakas, Sotirios Palaskas, Vasilios Agorastos and the priest Dimitrios Papaoikonomou. Some were sentenced to death and others to life imprisonment and all were jailed in the White Tower. During the Young Turks revolution they were released, after the intervention of the Greek consul of Thessaloniki.

=== Balkan Wars ===
During the First Balkan War Emmanouil Pappas and the whole territory of modern Serres regional unit to the east of Strymonas river was captured by the Bulgarian army on November 6, 1912. A small Bulgarian garrison was installed in the village but it left just few days before the decisive Greek victory in the battle of Kilkis-Lahanas of the Second Balkan War, which marked the liberation of East Macedonia after 550 years of foreign rule. Thus, Emmanouil Pappas became part of Greece on June 29 (Julian calendar, which was used in Greece until 1923)/July 11 (Gregorian calendar), 1913. During the Bulgarian occupation of the village (known to local historical memory as "Proti Voulgaria", literary "First Bulgaria") that lasted 8 months, the inhabitants suffered harsh persecutions and oppression by the Bulgarian authorities who employed a Bulgarization policy. People from Emmanouil Pappas participated in the fierce clashes between Bulgarian troops and irregular Greeks (members of old bands and other armed civilians from the city and the Greek villages around) that took place during the last two or three days before the retreating Bulgarians set on fire the city of Serres and fled to Bulgaria upon the arrival of the Greek army. Their casualties were 8 dead: 1)Daniil Daniil, 2)Christos Katsaros, 3)Dimitrios Kartsios, 4)Ioannis Tounas, 5)Lascaris Tsiakiris, 6)Dimitrios Chatzieleftheriou 7)Eleftherios Chatzieleftheriou, 8) Athanasios Psaltis. The testimony of the Bulgarian officer Ivan Kirpikov to the international commission of the Carnegie endowment which conducted an inquiry on the war crimes committed in the Balkan Wars, is indicative of the severity of those clashes and the participation of people from Emmanouil Pappas and other Darnakochoria. There is no doubt that those peasants wearing "the peculiar Greek costume of the villages that were considered as centers of Greek propaganda", according to the Bulgarian officer, were from Emmanouil Pappas and the other Darnakochoria, who were approaching the railway station through the railway line that passes by the village of Chryso.

=== World War I-the Bulgarian hostageship ===
The inhabitants of Emmanouil Pappas could not enjoy their freedom for a long time because their village, like the rest of Eastern Macedonia fell during World War I again under Bulgarian occupation ( a period known in local historical memory as "Thefteri Voulgaria"-literally "Second Bulgaria") after the events of the National Schism in 1916. Bulgarian rule is much harsher this time. The Bulgarians, being confident that the region will remain in their possession after the war, are engaged in an orgy of repression and persecution of the native Greek populations, in order to force them either to be Bulgarized or to leave their homeland. Thus, many Greek civilians residing in Bulgarian-occupied areas decide to flee to the territory to the west of Strymonas river that still remained under Greek rule. Greek schools are shut down and replaced by Bulgarian ones while the Greek language is banned in the churches and Holy Service is held only in Bulgarian, by Bulgarian priests. However, the most inhumane measure is the so-called "hostageship", the displacement of Greek civilians aged 17–60 years to different regions of Bulgaria and the present-day Republic of North Macedonia (which was then also under Bulgarian occupation), where they are forced to perform hard labour and die by the thousands, due to the unacceptable living conditions, malnutrition, exhaustion, diseases etc. A committee of the American Red Cross that came to Eastern Macedonia to provide humanitarian aid when the war ended, estimated that the total number of displaced to Bulgaria (and other Bulgarian-occupied areas) Greek civilians from Eastern Macedonia and Western Thrace during the Bulgarian occupation of these areas during World War I was nearly 200,000, of whom around 60,000 died and never came back, while many of those who returned were in such wretched health condition that had become incapable of any work. Among these 200,000 hostages or "ta dourdouvakia", as they are known in local tradition (Greek corruption of the Bulgarian phrase трудов войник/troudov voinik=labour soldier, as they were called by the Bulgarians), there were about 200 inhabitants of Emmanouil Pappas, of whom 110 died in Kicevo (today Republic of North Macedonia) and Karnobat (Bulgaria). Their names are written in the memorial in honour of the fallen in the wars, in the central square of the village. The above-mentioned report of the Committee of the American Red Cross also mentions that humanitarian aid (food, clothing, etc.) was distributed in Dovista and the neighbouring villages. Another not so known aspect of the history of the village during World War I, is that apart from the Bulgarian garrison there was installed and Turkish force too, which had set up a temporary hospital (in the school building) with Austrian military doctors, according to the memoirs of the German Air Force Lieutenant Georg Wilhelm Heydemarck.

=== Interwar period ===
During the interwar period a significant economic and cultural growth took place in the village of Emmanouil Pappas, especially in the 1920s and until the aftermath of the great financial crash of 1929 reached Greece. The enormously high prices which US and European companies offered for Greek tobacco at that time brought to most inhabitants an economic prosperity, landmarks of which are a few neoclassical houses that were built then and survived until today. The village became an important center of tobacco production and processing with several tobacco houses, which employed over 400 workers, most of whom came from Serres and other villages. A lot of various shops opened for the needs of this newly emerged working class and there was also set up a private power plant, which electrified the houses and streets of the village. At the same time there was a remarkable intellectual blossoming and there were founded several clubs that developed a significant cultural activity, such as presenting theatrical plays and the publishing of a magazine, already mentioned in a previous chapter. In the same period also was formed for first time a football team in the village, by the "Music-Gymnastics Association Emmanouil Papas".

In the Asia Minor Campaign, the inhabitants of the village of military age were recruited in the Greek Army and 11 of them were among the thousands of other Greeks who paid with their lives the Asia Minor disaster.

== Historical population ==
Historical population
Year	Pop.	±%
1913	2,038	—
1928	2,407	+18.1%
1940	2,620	+8.8%
1951	2,077	−20.7%
1961	2,049	−1.3%
1971	1,207	−41.1%
1981	1,133	−6.1%
1991	1,086	−4.1%
2001	1,063	−2.1%
2011	601	−43.5%
2021	475	−21.0%

== Notable people descending from Emmanouil Papas ==
- Emmanouel Pappas (1773-1821), leader of the Greek War of Independence in Macedonia.
- Stergios Mourgos (1933-), retired professor of Quantitative Economics of City University of New York, former director of the Greek National Tourist Organization in New York and former consul of Greece in New York.
- Andonis Malliaris (1944-), author and publisher.
- Stergios Tsiallas (1948-), Dr. of Nuclear Physics and researcher of the National Centre of Scientific Research "Demokritos".
- Vasilis Karanasios (1950-), Professor of Chemistry and researcher of the Waterloo University in Canada.
- Christos Giouzelis, (1962-2017), basketball coach and former basketball player.
- Nikos Oikonomou (1973-), basketball coach and former basketball player.
- Panayiotis Kokoras (1974-), internationally award-winning composer and computer music innovator.
- Nikol Kyriakopoulou (1986–), pole vault athlete.

== See also ==
- List of settlements in the Serres regional unit
