= Dimitrios Papatsonis =

Greek revolutionary (c.1798-1825)

Dimitrios Papatsonis (Greek: Δημήτριος Παπατσώνης; c. 1798 – 24 June 1825) was a fighter of the Greek War of Independence from the Peloponnese. He was killed at the age of 27 in June 1825 during the battle of Trikorfa against the Egyptian forces of Ibrahim Pasha of Egypt.

== Biography ==
Dimitrios Papatsonis was born in the village of Naziri, Messenia (later renamed Eva, now part of the municipality of Messini) and his family was one of the most prominent in the region before the revolution. He was the son of the governor of the province of Androusa, Anagnostis Papatsonis, who died from poisoning in 1811, and brother of Ioannis Papatsonis.

Dimitrios Papatsonis participated in the Greek Revolution and played an important role in the Liberation of Kalamata on March 23, 1821, as the leader of a militant group of over a thousand Messenian fighters, including great chiefs such as Mitros Petrovas and Panagiotis Kefalas. Later, he participated in the seizure of Kyparissia (26 March), which had been abandoned by the local Ottomans, and then he went along with other Greek rebels to Karytaina, one of the first strongholds of the revolution. In May 1821 he participated in the battle of Valtetsi and in July of the same year he was appointed one of the lieutenants of the Messenian forces that took part in the siege of Tripolitsa. During the fall of Tripolitsa, his men entered the city from the Mystras Gate, along with the men of Krevvatas, Giatrakos, Kefalas, and the bishop Theodoretos of Vresthena.

The following year, he participated in the destruction of the expeditionary army of Mahmud Dramali Pasha, commanding 600 armed men from Androusa and Leontari along with Kefalas and Mitropetrovas. After the fall of Tripolitsa, he became a member of the Peloponnesian Senate and representative of the province of Emplakia. In July 1823 he was accused of abuse of power by residents of the province. Later, during the Greek civil wars of 1824–25, being on the side of Theodoros Kolokotronis, he was imprisoned for a while by the Kountouriotis Government.

He also took part in the military operations against the Egyptian expeditionary force of Ibrahim Pasha in the Peloponnese. Specifically, he participated in the battle of Trampala, having under his command 767 men. After the negative outcome of the battle for the Greeks, he took refuge in Chrysovitsi of Arcadia, together with Theodoros Kolokotronis, Dimitris Plapoutas, and Kanellos Deligiannis.

On 24 June 1825, he participated in the battle of Trikorfa, being in charge of distributing ammunition to the soldiers. The battle ended with the defeat of the Greeks and with Papatsonis falling in battle. His body was desecrated by opponents, who removed his weapons, his gold-embroidered clothing, and a sum of 350 pounds that he carried on him.

== See also ==
- Papatsonis family

== Bibliography ==
- Αρχεία της Ελληνικής Παλιγγενεσίας, 1821 – 1832, Έκδοσις Βιβλιοθήκης της Βουλής των Ελλήνων – εκ του Εθνικού Τυπογραφείου, τόμος 9ος, Αθήναι, 1976.
- Αποστόλου Ε. Βακαλοπούλου, Ιστορία του Νέου Ελληνισμού, τόμος ΣΤ', Θεσσαλονίκη 1982.
- Αποστόλου Ε. Βακαλοπούλου, Ιστορία του Νέου Ελληνισμού, τόμος Ζ', Θεσσαλονίκη 1986.
- Διονυσίου Κοκκίνου, Η Ελληνική Επανάστασις, εκδόσεις Μέλισσα, έκτη έκδοσις, Αθήναι 1974.
- Παπατσώνης, Παναγιώτης. Απομνημονεύματα. Αθήνα: Εθνικό Τυπογραφείο 1960.
- Φραντζής, Αμβρόσιος. Επιτομή της Ιστορίας της αναγεννηθείσης Ελλάδος, Τόμος Πρώτος. Αθήνα: Εκ της Τυπογραφίας Η Βιτώρια του Κωνστ. Καστόρχη και Συντροφίας 1839.
- Φώτιος Χρυσανθόπουλος, Βίοι Πελοποννησίων ανδρών και των εξώθεν εις την Πελοπόννησον ελθόντων κληρικών, στρατιωτικών και πολιτικών των αγωνισαμένων τον αγώνα της επαναστάσεως, Αθήναι, 1888.
