= Battle of Vasilika (Thessaloniki) =

Battle during the Greek War of Independence

- Part of the Greek War of Independence
Date	10 June 1821
Location	Vasilika, Thessaloniki, Ottoman Empire (now Greece)
Result	Ottoman victory

Belligerents
Greek revolutionaries	Ottoman Empire

Commanders and leaders
Stamatios Kapsas †	Bayram Pasha

Strength
2,000	~35,000

Casualties and losses
Heavy	Unknown

The Battle of Vasilika was fought on 10 June 1821 in Greece, between the Ottoman and the Greek forces led by the Captain Stamatios Kapsas.

== Background ==
During the Greek War of Independence, the region surrounding Thessaloniki revolted against the Ottoman authorities of the area. The local Ottomans requested reinforcements from the Sublime Porte, which arrived under the lead of Bayram Pasha. The latter arrived at Thessaloniki, pillaged and burned many villages and towns surrounding the city, and increased his army to about 35,000 soldiers, including 5,000 cavalrymen.

== Battle ==
The leader of the revolution around Thessaloniki, Emmanouel Pappas, was forced to flee in Polygyros with his contingent. Then, Bayram Pasha marched against Vasilika, where about 2,000 Greeks under the command of captain Stamatios Kapsas were encamped and fortified. The revolutionaries, realizing that the upcoming battle would be lost, attempted to ransom their women and children to the monastery of Hagia Anastasia, but the local Ottomans thwarted this attempt, and, during this clash, many Greeks lost their lives.

On 10 June 1821, Bayram Pasha stormed the camp of Vasilika. Fierce battle ensued, in which sixty-two Greek revolutionaries and some hundreds of Turkish soldiers were killed. Stamatios Kapsas himself was also killed in action, and the Greek defense collapsed shortly after his death. Most of the Greek revolutionaries retreated in Polygyros and Babdos.

== Aftermath ==
After the battle, Bayram Pasha continued pillaging regions that had revolted against the Ottomans. Then, Emmanouel Pappas decided to form a camp in Kassandra of Chalkidiki and started assembling many civilians and recruiting Greek soldiers. But due to ammunition and food shortages, he was unable recruit a large army and, nearly six months later, on 30 October 1821, the Ottomans attacked Kassandra. The assault was proved decisive, and the Turks destroyed the camp. Emmanuel Pappas barely managed to save his life, only to die several days after this conflict; thus, the revolution in Thessaloniki failed completely.

== Sources ==
- Christopoulos, Georgios A. & Bastias, Ioannis K., eds. (1975). Ιστορία του Ελληνικού Έθνους [History of the Greek Nation] (in Greek). Vol. ΙΒ: Η Ελληνική Επανάσταση (1821 - 1832) [The Greek Revolution (1821 - 1832)]. Athens: Ekdotiki Athinon. ISBN 978-960-213-108-4.
