= Nikola Andreev (Odrin voyvoda) =

Bulgarian revolutionary

- Born: Maklen (ruins), today in Emmanouil Pappas, Greece
- Organization: IMARO

Nikola Andreev was a Bulgarian revolutionary who worked in the Internal Macedonian-Adrianople Revolutionary Organization (IMARO).

Andreev was born in the former village of Maklen, Serres (neighbouring Duvista), then in the Ottoman Empire. He finished the Bulgarian Pedagogical School in Serres and became a teacher in Odrin Thrace. He was appointed leader of a revolutionary band in the region of Smolyan, that was part of the Odrin revolutionary region. In 1906, he was captured by the Turks, but he successfully escaped to Bulgaria.

During 1907, Nikola Andreev was a freedom fighter of the Drama revolutionary band of Mihail Daev. After the Young Turk Revolution he was no longer freedom fighter and started working as a teacher. Until the beginning of the Balkan Wars, he was a leader of a revolutionary band in the region of Smolyan, and later he became a member of a non-combatant support service of the 13th Kukush Battalion of the Macedonian-Adrianopolitan Volunteer Corps.

Information about the life of Nikola Andreev after 1913 is not available.
