= Dafnoudi =

Village in Central Macedonia, Greece

Coordinates: 41°03′40″N 23°44′46″E

Dafnoudi (Greek: Δαφνούδι) a village in Serres regional unit of Central Macedonia, Greece, located 22 km east of the city of Serres, at a short distance from the southwest slopes of the mountain Menoikio. Since 2011 administrative reform it is a municipal unit of the municipality of Emmanouil Pappas and has a population of 443 inhabitants. Until 1928 it was named “Nouska”.

== History ==
=== Antiquity ===
About 1000 m. west of Dafnoudi - at the "Paliochori" site - the location of a Roman settlement has been identified, based on the surface pottery. From the same place comes also the epitaph of a Thracian (2nd century AD). Furthermore, on the hill "Kailias", located a few kilometers northeast of Dafnoudi, near the administrative boundaries with the village of Agios Christoforos, there are remnants (walls and foundations of buildings) of an ancient fortified settlement. On the slopes of the nearby hills were discovered tombs and fragments of Roman-era vases. This is probably the place where another tomb of a Thracian (1st century AD), formerly found in the surrounding area by a resident of Agios Christoforos, probably comes from.
