= Hyameia =

Hyameia (Ancient Greek: Ὑαμεία), also known as Hyamia (Ὑαμία), was a town of ancient Messenia. According to tradition, Cresphontes established the territory of Hyameia (called the Hyameitis) as one of the five territories into which he divided Messenia. It was located between Messene and Androusa.
