= Neo Souli =

Neo Souli (Greek: Νέο Σούλι) can refer to:

- Neo Souli, Achaea, a village near Patras
- Neo Souli, Serres, a village in the Serres Prefecture
