= Panagiotis Kefalas =

Greek military leader

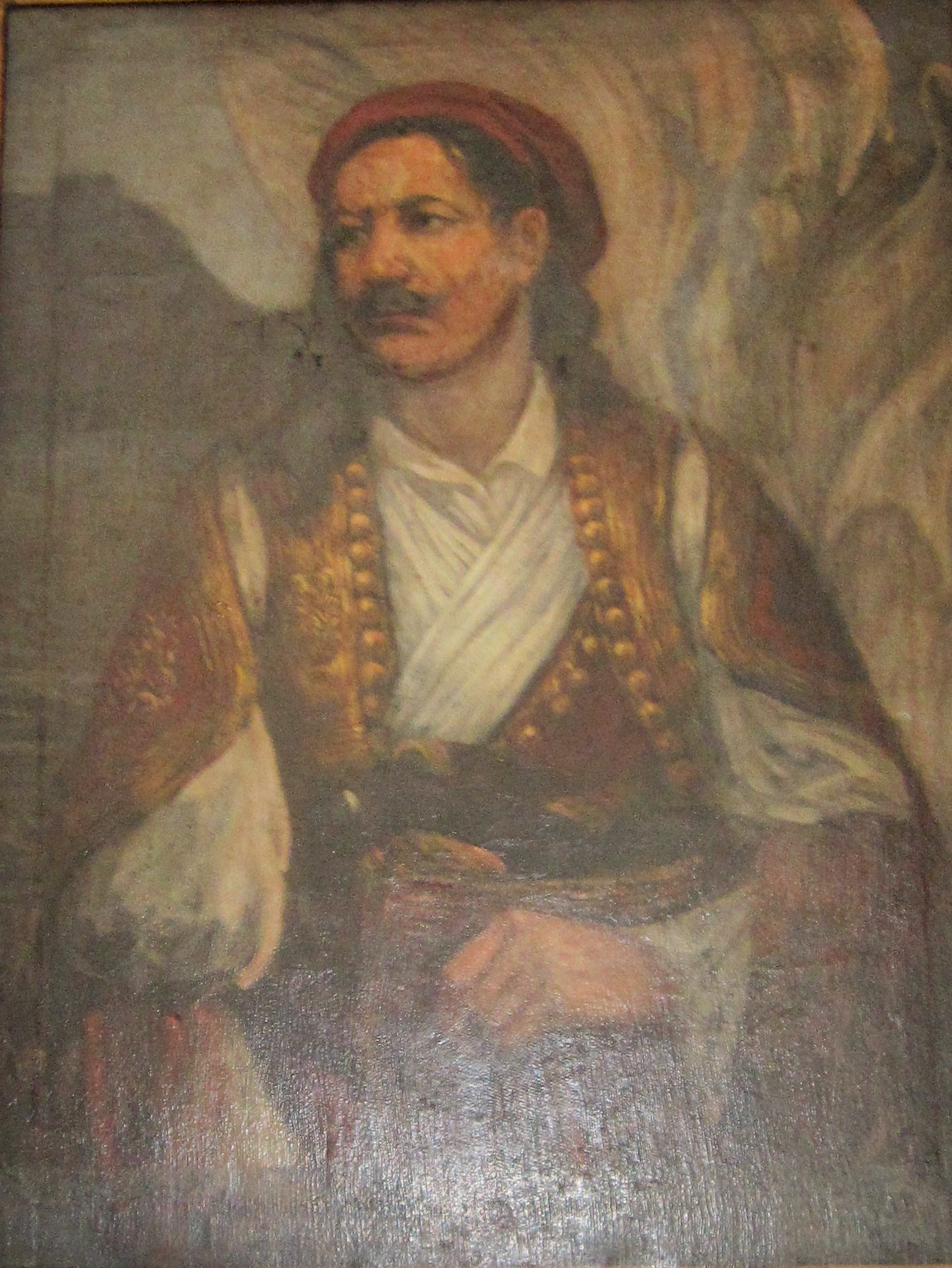
- Native name: Παναγιώτης Κεφάλας
- Born: Androusa, Morea Eyalet, Ottoman Empire (now Greece)
- Died: 20 May 1825; Maniaki, First Hellenic Republic
- Allegiance: (Greece) First Hellenic Republic
- Service / branch: Hellenic Army
- Battles / wars: Greek War of Independence: Liberation of Kalamata; Siege of Tripolitsa; Battle of Valtetsi; Battle of Maniaki †

Panagiotis Kefalas (Greek: Παναγιώτης Κεφάλας) was a Greek fighter of the Greek War of Independence.

== Biography ==
He hailed from Dirrachi in the Androusa province, but was unrelated to the Kefalas magnate family. He took part in several battles of the Greek War of Independence, from the capture of Kalamata and Karytaina to the Battle of Valtetsi and the Siege of Tripolitsa, where he commanded a Tsakonian detachment with distinction. He also fought against Mahmud Dramali Pasha in 1822, and in Continental Greece.

He fell at the Battle of Maniaki in 1825.

== Sources ==
- Fotios Chrysanthopoulos (1888). Βίοι Πελοποννησίων ανδρών και των εξώθεν εις την Πελοπόννησον ελθόντων κληρικών, στρατιωτικών και πολιτικών των αγωνισαμένων τον αγώνα της επαναστάσεως. Athens: Σταύρος Ανδρόπουλος, Τυπογραφείο Π. Δ. Σακελλαρίου.
