= Agio Pnevma =

Village in Central Macedonia, Greece

Agio Pnevma Άγιο Πνεύμα
- Community
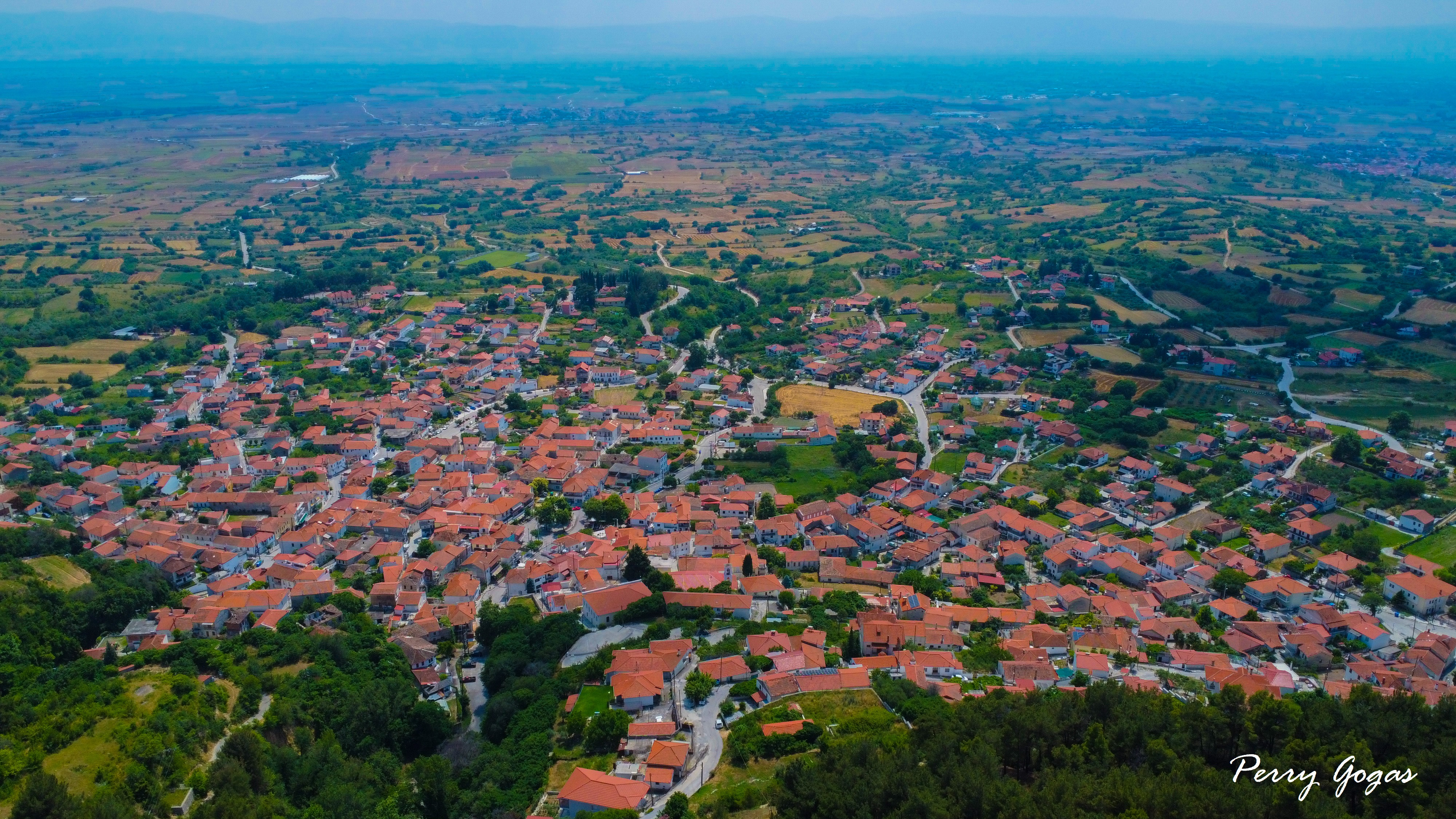

- Location within Greece
- Coordinates: 41°06′05″N 23°40′45″E
- Country: Greece
- Administrative region: Central Macedonia
- Regional unit: Serres
- Municipality: Emmanouil Pappas
- Municipal unit: Emmanouil Pappas

Population (2021)
  - Community: 1,031
- Time zone: UTC+2 (EET)
  - Summer (DST): UTC+3 (EEST)

Agio Pnevma (Greek: Άγιο Πνεύμα) is a village and a former community in Serres regional unit of Central Macedonia, Greece located 12 km east of the city of Serres, on the southwestern mountain slopes of Menoikio (altitude 310 m). Since the 2011 local government reform it is a part (municipal unit) of the municipality Emmanouil Pappas, whose the seat is in Chryso. It has a population of 1,031 inhabitants (2021). Until 1928 was named "Vezniko" and from 1928 until 1940 "Monoiko". Its current name is Greek for "Holy Spirit." Well known modern Greek singer Glykeria was born in Agio Pnevma in 1953.

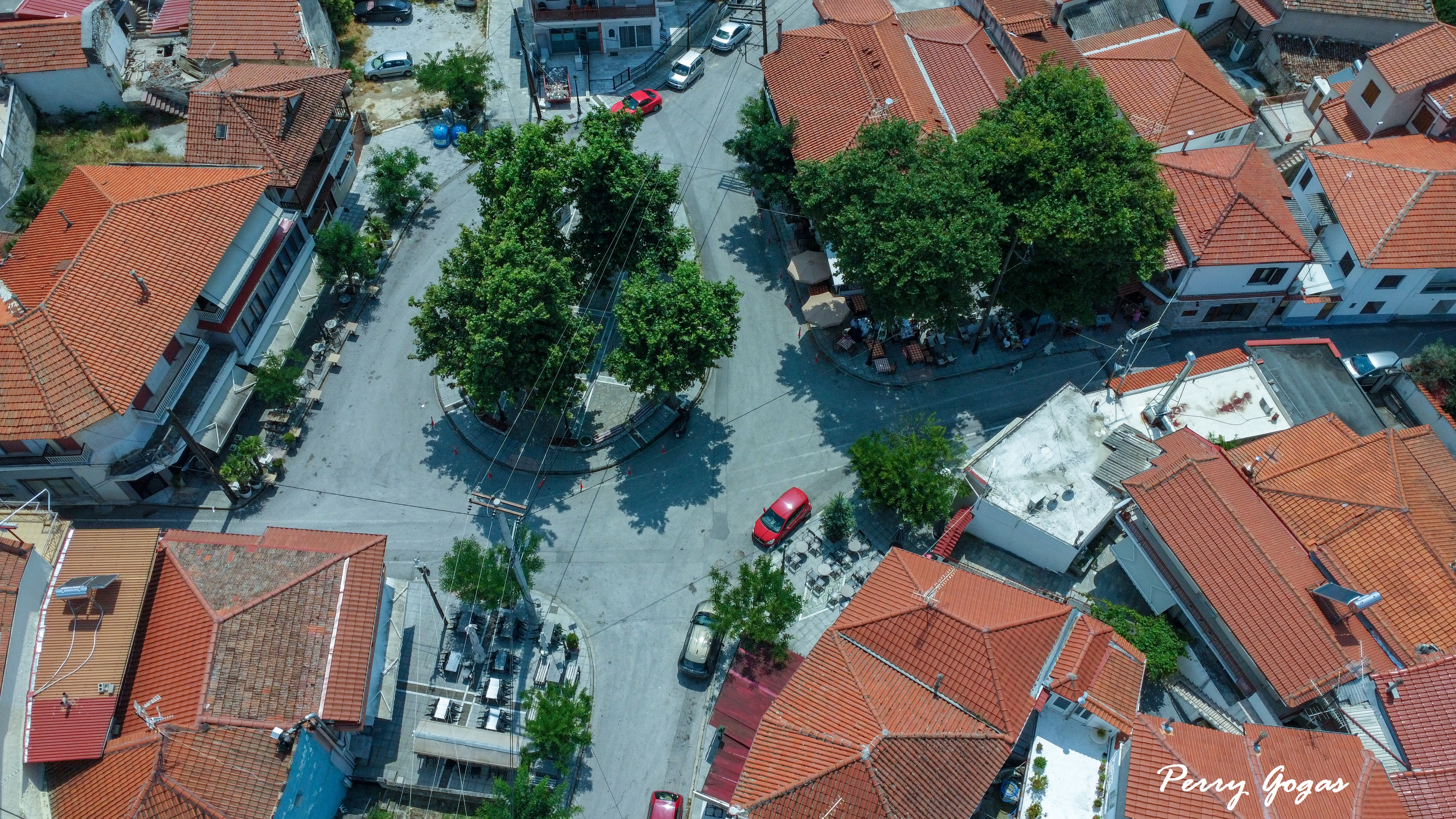
Central square

== History ==
=== Greek antiquity ===
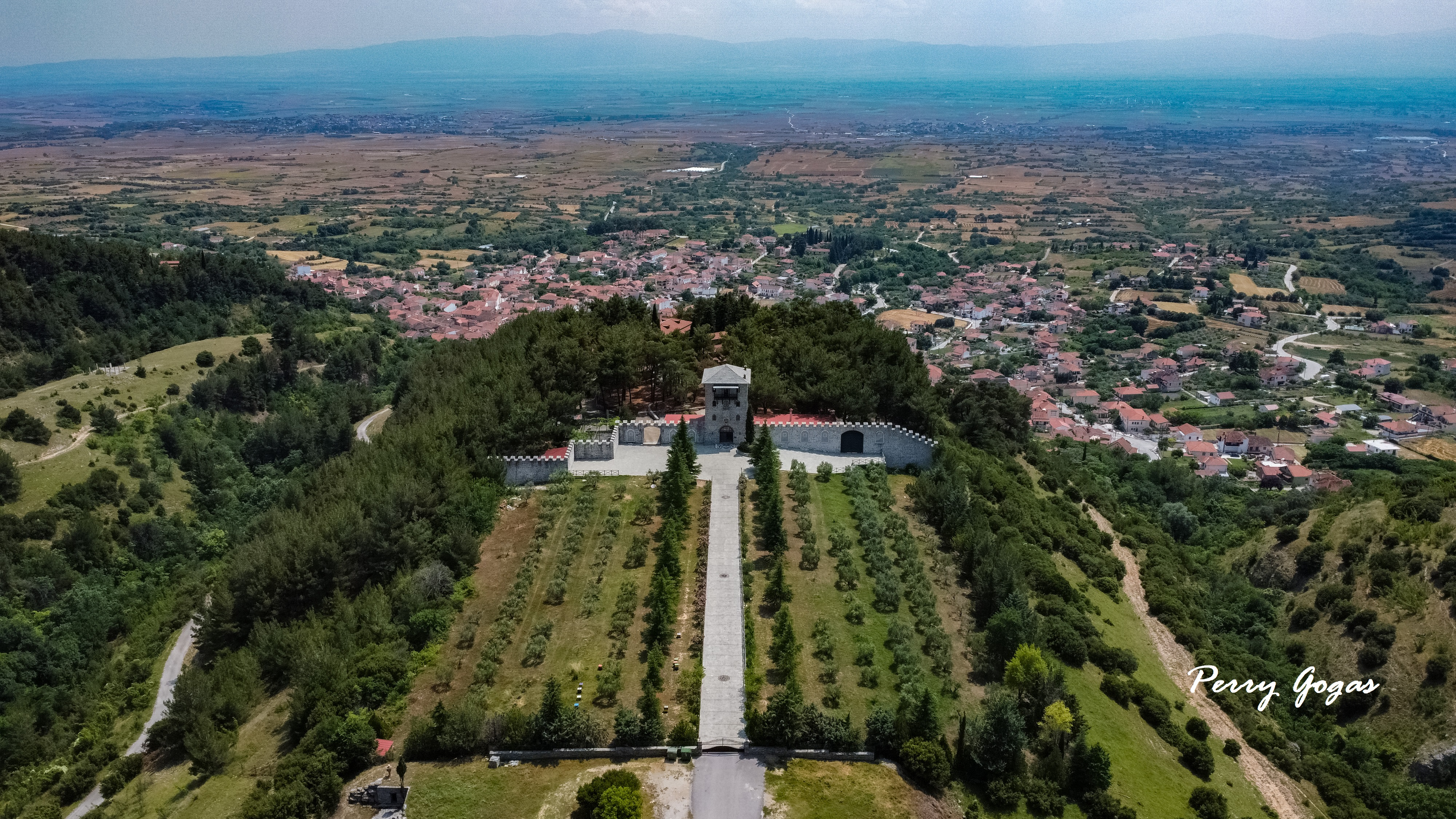
Monastery of Saint Elijah

The village presents an impressive lifetime from prehistoric until present times. Within the village at the hill of St. Constantine the site of a prehistoric settlement is testified, which was abandoned in early antiquity. After this life continued in the ancient times alongside the present village on the steep hill of "Gradiskos", where were found the ruins of an ancient small town, probably named "Monoikos" and belonged to the region of Odomantice.

=== Roman antiquity ===
This town, which survived until Byzantine times under the name "Monospito", had flourished in Roman times and especially during the imperial period (1st-3rd century AD). In the 3rd AD century, because of the frequent barbaric raids, it was fortified with acropolis, from which some parts of its wall have been preserved to the day. The iron rust and a Latin inscription show the systematic exploitation of the iron mines of the surrounding area. Of particular interest is also the discovery – a few kilometers northeast – of a marble quarry, which seems to have worked during the imperial period (Ist-3rd century AD).

== See also ==
List of settlements in the Serres regional unit
