= Mitropetrovas =

Greek revolutionary (1745–1838)

Mitros Petrovas or Mitropetrovas (Greek: Μήτρος Πέτροβας, Μητροπέτροβας; 1745 – 12 March 1838) was a military leader of the Greek War of Independence from Messenia and one of the leaders of the anti-government riots during the Bavarian regency of Greece.

== Biographical information ==
He was born in 1745 in Ano Melpeia (now part of the municipality of Oichalia in Messenia). He developed an early anti-Ottoman activity and in 1770 he participated in the Orlov Revolt. He was a friend of Theodoros Kolokotronis father, Konstantinos. Later, he participated in the preparation of the Greek War of Independence in Messenia and when that begun, he was at the side of Theodoros Kolokotronis, whom he followed in the military operations in Arcadia. Despite his advanced age, he participated in the Battle of Valtetsi in May 1821 as the head of the fighters of Androusa and Leontari. Positioned on the western bastion of the Greek camp together with Ioannis Mavromichalis, P. Kefalas and Dimitrios Papatsonis, he was distinguished for the repulse of the repeated attacks of the Ottoman cavalry. Later he participated in the siege and conquest of Tripolitsa. In 1822, he participated in the operations against the expeditionary force of Mahmud Dramali Pasha. For his contribution, he was named a chiliarch in 1823. During the Greek civil wars of 1824–25, he supported Kolokotronis's side and for that, he was arrested and jailed by the government forces of the Georgios Kountouriotis in the monastery of Prophet Elias on Hydra Island. Soon after his release in May 1825, he became a general and took part in the operations against Ibrahim Pasha of Egypt.

After the Revolution ended and Greek state was created, Mitropetrovas participated in 1834, after the trial and conviction of Kolokotronis for treason, in rebellions against the Bavarian regency in Mani (in June) and in Messenia (in August). After the suppression of the uprisings, he was arrested and convicted to death, but the sentence was not executed because of his advanced age and his contribution during the Greek Revolution. After remaining for some time in prison, he was given amnesty and then he returned to his home town, where he died in 1838.

== Bibliography ==
- Εκπαιδευτική Ελληνική Εγκυκλοπαίδεια – Παγκόσμιο Βιογραφικό Λεξικό, Εκδοτική Αθηνών, Athens 1991. (Greek)
- Dionysios Kokkinos, Η Ελληνική Επανάστασις, vol. 1 & 2, Athens 1974. (Greek)
