= Georgios Flessas =

Greek revolutionary (1716–1770)

- Born: Georgios Flessas; 1716; Poliani, Messenia, Greece, Ottoman Empire
- Died: 16 July 1770 (aged 53–54); Messini, Messenia, Greece, Ottoman Empire
- Children: Dimitris Flessas
- Father: Dimitris Flessas
- Relatives: Papaflessas (grandson)

Georgios Flessas (1716 – 16 July 1770) was the son of Dimitris Flessas and grandfather of the fighter Papaflessas.

== Early years ==
He was born in Poliani of Messenia in 1716. With his two brothers Nikolaos and Konstantinos they had the goats and sheep of the Flessians in Poliani and in the winter they went down to Gardiki to spend the winter. From a very young age he was trained in the rifle and the yatagan by his father and when he came of age he formed his own Klepht group with his brothers, other Flessians and Polianites, to protect their families from the Turks and bandits.

== Historical frame ==
In 1770 the Greek rebellion broke out at the instigation of Russia, which sent the Orlov brothers to Greece to take over the leadership. The Russians and the Greeks had friendly relations because of their common Orthodox faith. At the same time, the Russians believed that the Greeks could weaken the Ottoman Empire for their own benefit, while the Greeks, since they began to gain national consciousness, hoped that Russia would grant them their liberation.

Peter the Great was the first Russian who had conceived the dream of reconstituting the Byzantine Empire under his orders and for this reason he did his best to maintain friendly relations with the Greeks, whom he intended to use against the sultan in the future. The Greeks recognized in the person of Peter their patron. Russian aspirations were inherited as a natural continuation to Peter's successors. Thus Catherine II of Russia, who had been at war with the High Gate since January 1769, immediately thought of the Greeks when she needed a distraction to save her army which was threatened by the Tatars on the banks of the Dnieper river.

With the Treaty of Küçük Kaynarca the Russian forces withdrew leaving the Greeks.

== Participation in Orlov revolt ==
On 5 July 1770, the last act of the revolution took place in Messini by Orlov. There, in the ruins of the old tower of Izambos, in the present site of Panigyristria, Flessas fortified himself with 150 Messenians. He had arrived there earlier with 150 Messinians to support Ioannis Skylogiannis, a relative of P. Gerakaris, who distinguished himself under Morosini. They encamped in the tower of Georgios Hatzis or Pligouris outside the Fortress of Pylos, but were besieged by the Turks who had hurriedly arrived from Tripoli and a massacre ensued.

One remained from this clash:

Levéntes palikária apó tin Polianí
me t' isimóarmatá tous páne gia to Nisí.
Pernóntas tin Syróka kai tin Velanidiá
Evrískoun éna géro me 4 paidiá.
Geia sou chará sou géro
Kalós ta ta paidiá,
kalós ton kapetánio
me ta kleftópoula.
Síko na páme géro
na páme sto Nisí.
gia Toúrkika kefália
éla kontá kai sy.

Pós na 'rtho Kapetánie
poú eím' anímporos,
ma páre ta paidiá mou
ki' as meíno monachós.
Próseche Kapetánie
sto drómo poú tha vgis,
eínai giomátos Toúrkous
ki' adíkos tha chathís.
Fléssa Giórgi me léne
kai lógia den akó.
Toús Toúrkous tha ktypíso
to aíma tous tha pio...

— folk song

== See also ==
- Orlov revolt
