= Liberation of Kalamata =

Battle In the Greek War Of Independence

- Part of the Greek War of Independence
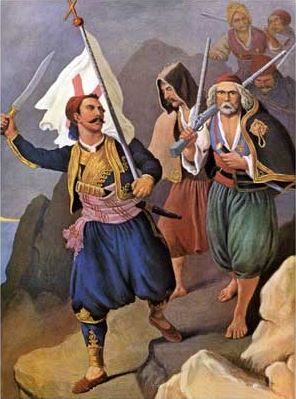
- Petros Mavromichalis revolts Messenia by Peter von Hess.
Date	22–23 March 1821
Location	Kalamata, Morea Eyalet, Ottoman Empire (now Messenia, Greece)
Result	Greek victory; Formation of the Messenian Senate

Belligerents
Greek revolutionies: Maniot Forces	Ottoman Empire

Commanders and leaders
Theodoros Kolokotronis; Dimitrios Papatsonis; Papaflessas; Anagnostaras; Nikitaras; Petrobey Mavromichalis	Ottoman Empire Suleiman Pasha Arnautoglu

Strength
3,000; 150	Unknown

Casualties and losses
Unknown	Unknown

The Liberation of Kalamata took place on 23 March (O.S.) 1821 when Greek irregular revolutionary forces took control of the city after the surrender of the Ottoman garrison, without fighting. It was one of the first events of the Greek War of Independence. Kalamata became the first major town to be liberated.

== Background ==
From the first days of March 1821, the revolutionary sentiment was prevailing in the Peloponnese and this worried the Ottomans, who sent their families to nearby fortresses. At the same time, the army chief of Kalamata, Suleiman Aga Arnaoutoglou, called the local Greek elites to express his concerns about reports of a forthcoming uprising.

He was told that the area was being looted by dangerous brigands and that his 150 Ottoman guards were not enough to defend the town. He was then persuaded to seek the help of the Maniots and their bey, Petrobey Mavromichalis. At the same time, Papaflessas, who was pulling the strings in the Peloponnese, had managed to persuade Petrobey to take a leading role in the uprising.

The plan was set up perfectly by the Greeks, who were extremely persuasive in making Suleiman Aga ask for help from Petrobey. The bey sent 150 experienced fighters from Mani together with his son Ilias Mavromichalis, under the pretext of protecting the town from the brigands. After gaining the confidence of the aga, Ilias Mavromichalis requested additional aid from Mani because rumors of an impending invasion of the town were growing. Indeed, the aga asked for reinforcements from Petrobey. This was the signal for the Greek rebels to attack.

== Liberation ==
On 22 March 1821, a force of 2000 armed men led by Theodoros Kolokotronis tightened the siege around the city coming from the southeast and occupying the surrounding hills. At the same time, Dimitrios Papatsonis arrived with a body of over a thousand Messinian fighters, including Mitros Petrovas and Panagiotis Kefalas, joining the Maniots of Petrobey Mavromichalis, and the forces of Papaflessas, Anagnostaras and Nikitaras.

On the morning of 23 March 1821, the Messinian revolutionaries occupied the town. The Ottomans surrendered without fighting and Suleiman aga handed over the town and the Turkish armaments to the Greek revolutionaries. At noon of the same day, in front of the Byzantine Church of the Holy Apostles in Kalamata, a doxology was performed by 24 priests and monks.

== Aftermath ==
Soon, one of the first tactical regiments was created in the city under the command of the Corsican philhellene Joseph Balestra. A meeting of the chiefs and local leaders followed, where it was decided to form the Messenian Senate, a revolutionary committee that was the first administrative institution of the revolting Greeks.

The Greeks soon began the sieges of the fortresses of Neokastro and Monemvasia.
