= Pentapoli =

Pentapoli Πεντάπολη
- Community
- Location within Greece
- Coordinates: 41°03′00″N 23°41′20″E
- Country: Greece
- Administrative region: Central Macedonia
- Regional unit: Serres
- Municipality: Emmanouil Pappas
- Municipal unit: Emmanouil Pappas

Population (2021)
  - Community: 773
- Time zone: UTC+2 (EET)
  - Summer (DST): UTC+3 (EEST)

Pentapoli (Greek: Πεντάπολη, Byzantine Greek: Ξυλοπήγαδο) a small town in Serres regional unit of Central Macedonia, Greece, located 14 km southeast of the city of Serres. Since 2011 it is a municipal unit of the municipality of Emmanouil Pappas. It has a population of 773 inhabitants (2021). Until 1928 it was named Sarmusakli (Σαρμουσακλή).

At Pentapolis is testified the traces of an ancient settlement. His cemetery was unveiled at the location "Alonia", where coins and vases of Roman times had been found in the past.
