= Toumpa, Serres =

Toumpa Τούμπα
- Community
- Location within Greece
- Coordinates: 41°01′26″N 23°42′25″E
- Country: Greece
- Administrative region: Central Macedonia
- Regional unit: Serres
- Municipality: Emmanouil Pappas
- Municipal unit: Emmanouil Pappas

Population (2021)
  - Community: 468
- Time zone: UTC+2 (EET)
  - Summer (DST): UTC+3 (EEST)

Toumpa (Greek: Τούμπα) is a village in Serres regional unit of Central Macedonia, Greece, located 20 km (12 mi) southeast of Serres. Since 2011 it is a municipal unit of the municipality of Emmanouil Pappas and has a population of 468 inhabitants (2021). The village bore the same name before 1928.

== History ==
On the hillside of Phakistra, located very close to Toumpa, a lot of archaeological finds have been unearthed over time and between them two Greek inscriptions of Roman imperial times (2nd century AD). All these testifies to the existence of an ancient settlement with a continuous life from prehistoric to Byzantine times.
