= Menoikio =

Mountain range in Greece

- Μενοίκιο
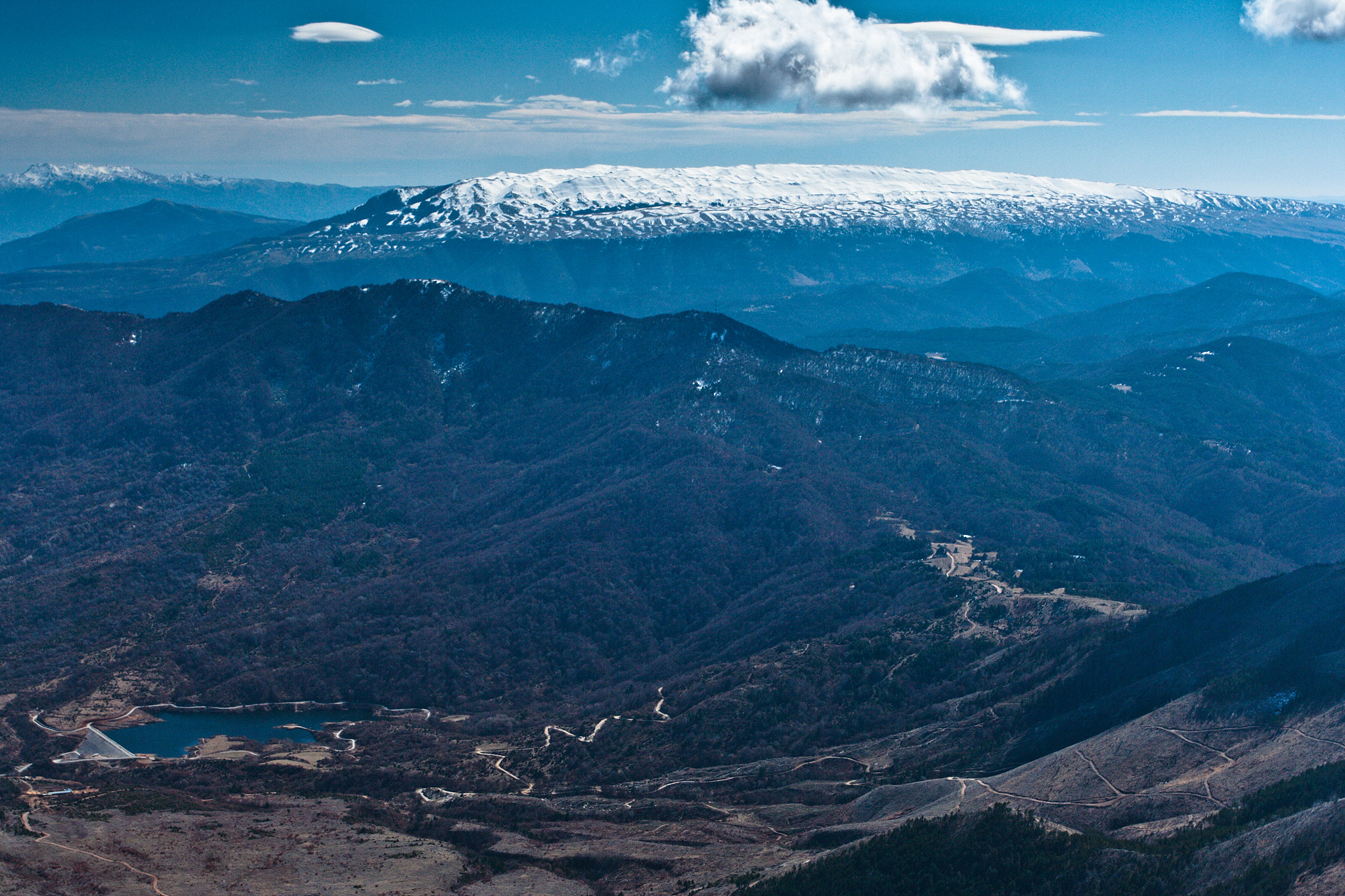
- Menoikio viewed from Orvilos (Slavyanka)

Highest point
- Elevation: 1,963 m (6,440 ft)
- Coordinates: 41°03′22″N 23°45′00″E

Naming
- Pronunciation: Greek: [meˈnikio]

Geography
- Location within Greece
- Location: Eastern Serres and western Drama regional unit, Greece

Menoikio (Greek: Μενοίκιο, also known to the local populations as "Bozdakas" and "Bozdas", Greek corruptions of the Turkish name "Boz Dag", which was applied to the mountain by the Turks in Ottoman time, Bulgarian: Сминица, Sminitsa) is a mountain range in the eastern Serres and western Drama regional units of eastern Macedonia, Greece. The highest peak of the mountain is Mavromata at 1,963 m.

== Geography ==
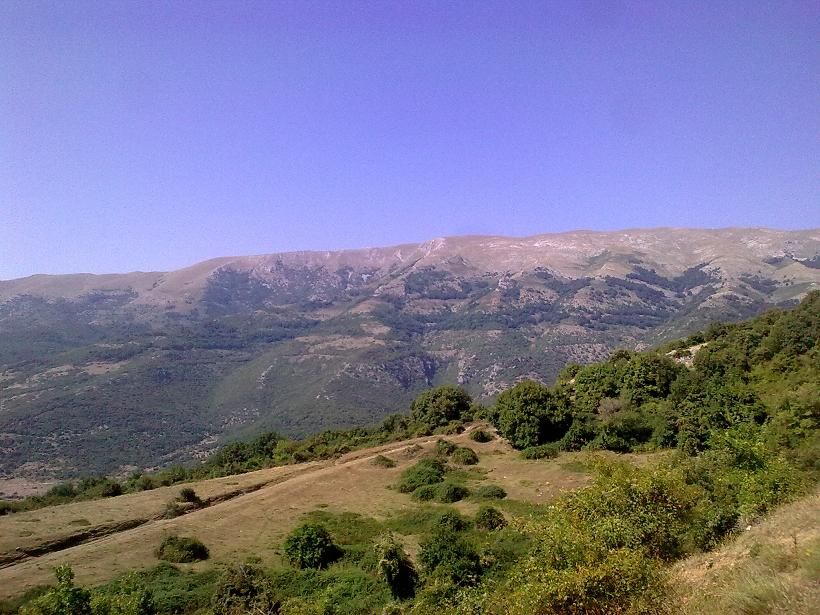
A close view of Mount Menoikio, from its foothills 8 km to the north-east of Emmanouil Pappas.

To the west, it is connected with the Vrontous mountain range and to the north via the Mavro Vouno mountain to Orvilos. Menoikio is mostly composed of marble and is almost entirely deforested.

The nearest significant settlements are Serres, Nea Zichni, Emmanouil Pappas and Agio Pnevma to the south and Alistrati and Mikropoli to the west and north. Otherwise the mountain is among the least populated in the Balkans.

== History ==
On the mountain is testified the existence, in the Roman (imperial) times, of marble quarries and iron mines.

A notable landmark of the mountain is the Byzantine monastery of John the Baptist (founded in 1270), 8 km to the north of the city of Serres. Gennadius, the first Ecumenical Patriarch after the Fall of Constantinople, after his resignation in 1465 lived as monk in the monastery, ended his days and was buried there in 1473. His relics were exhumed in 1854 and the following epigram was erected in the place where his grave stood:

Ἣδε μεν ἡ Προδρόμοιο Μονή τήν κόσμος αείδει
ἡ πολιή μήτηρ Μακεδόνων ζαθέων
ἥδε δε Γενναδίου πατριάρχεω, τοῦ κλέος εὐρύ,
νεκροδόχος λάρναξ ἀθανάτου φθιμένου.

This is the monastery of Prodromus, which is praised with hymns by the people
the hoary mother of sacred Macedonians
and this is the coffin of Patriarch Gennadius, whose glory was great,
the immortal deceased.

== See also ==
- List of mountains in Greece
