= Chryso, Serres =

Chryso Χρυσό
- Community
- Location within Greece
- Coordinates: 41°03′29″N 23°39′00″E
- Country: Greece
- Administrative region: Central Macedonia
- Regional unit: Serres
- Municipality: Emmanouil Pappas
- Municipal unit: Emmanouil Pappas

Population (2021)
  - Community: 1,006
- Time zone: UTC+2 (EET)
  - Summer (DST): UTC+3 (EEST)

Chryso (Greek: Χρυσό) is a small town in Serres regional unit of Central Macedonia, Greece, located 12 km southeast of Serres. Since 2011 it is a municipal unit of the municipality of Emmanouil Pappas. It has a population of 1,006 inhabitants (2021). Until 1928 it was named Topoliani (Τοπόλιανη).

== History ==
About 3 km south of Chryso, on a low hill, the traces of a Roman-era rural settlement was found, near where remains of a Roman arched bridge and a paved road section are preserved.

The existence of another agricultural Roman settlement has also been identified on the rocky hill (former village) of "Zeli", situated between Chryso and Agio Pnevma, from where comes a Greek funeral inscription of Roman imperial times (2nd-3rd AD century)

== See also ==
List of settlements in the Serres regional unit
