= Stamatios Kapsas =

Greek chieftain

- Born: Pazarakia (now Kryopigi, Chalkidiki, Greece)
- Died: 10 June 1821; Vasilika, Thessaloniki (now Greece)

Stamatios (Stamos) Kapsas (Greek: Σταμάτιος (Στάμος) Κάψας), known as Kapetan Chapsas (Καπετάν Χάψας), was a chieftain of the Greek Revolution of 1821 from Chalkidiki.

== Biography ==
Stamatios Kapsas was born in the village of Pazarakia (now Kryopigi, Chalkidiki) in the late 18th century. At an early age he moved to Sykia to find work, but quickly came into conflict with the local Ottoman authorities, and became a klepht active in the region of Sithonia, Mount Cholomon, and the Chasikochoria (modern Polygyros area).

By the time of the outbreak of the Greek War of Independence in 1821, he was serdar (watchman) of the central administrative body of the monasteries of Mount Athos at Karyes. On 23 March 1821, with the aid of ship captains from Psara and Ainos, Emmanouil Pappas landed on Athos with guns and ammunition. After meeting with Kapsas, they began forming an army. Supported by the Metropolitan of Maroneia Konstantios, they gathered 1,000 armed monks, while Kapsas roamed Chalkidiki, where he enjoyed great prestige due to his activity as a klepht, to rally more men to their cause. The men he gathered came mostly from the Sithonia and Kassandra peninsulas and the Chasikochoria, especially from Sykia. Kapsas' army quickly swelled to 2,000 men. The Ottomans, disquieted by the rapid spread of the revolt, launched pogroms against the Greek populace in Thessaloniki and its vicinity, thereby leading to the spread of the revolt with uprisings occurring throughout the modern Thessaloniki and Serres prefectures. In view of these developments, on 17 May Pappas officially proclaimed the Greek Revolution in northern Greece. The rebel army was split in two: Pappas with the monks and the men of the Mademochoria (the twelve villages around the silver mines in eastern Chalkidiki) moved east towards Rentina to confront the Ottoman troops moving to suppress the rebellion from Thrace, while Kapsas (with Anastasios Chymeftos as deputy commander) and his 2,000 men moved west to capture Thessaloniki.

From Athos, Kapsas moved through the villages of Chalkidiki to Vasilika and Thermi, where the rebels set up camp (8 June 1821) to prepare for the assault on Thessaloniki. On the same day, Kapsas' men confronted and defeated the Ottoman cavalry near the modern American Agricultural School, under Ahmed Bey of Giannitsa, in which the Greeks were victorious, forcing the Ottomans to retreat to Thessaloniki. The Austrian consul in the city reported at the time that "even here disorder is spreading. The anxiety and fear, whether the Greeks should strike at the city from both land and sea, is widespread, although the government has taken the richest and most influential Greeks as hostages."

In the meantime, however, Pappas had encountered the Ottoman reinforcements coming from Drama and Constantinople and was driven back after battles at Rentina and Apollonia. With only 200 men remaining, he sped west to unite with Kapsas. The latter, informed of the dire situation in the east, retreated to Vasilika, where he united with Pappas' men. In Thessaloniki, Ebu Lubut Pasha had gathered an overwhelming army of 30,000 foot and 5,000 horse, and moved to meet the rebels. Kapsas chose to give battle at the narrow valley of Anthemountas river, near the Monastery of St. Anastasia, but detached Chymeftos with some of his men to cover the Kassandra peninsula against a possible landing of Ottoman troops by sea in his rear.

The ensuing battle at Vasilika quickly turned into a disaster for the Greeks, especially after the Ottoman troops began massacring the inhabitants of the village. The local magnate Georgios Kotzias then suggested that the rebels should barricade themselves in the Monastery of St. Anastasia, but the monks would only allow the non-combatants to enter the monastery. Kapsas remained in the field with just 67 men to delay the Ottomans, while Pappas with the remaining army covered the civilians' flight to the monastery. Kapsas and his 67 men were killed to the last. A monument at the site commemorates their sacrifice.

== Sources ==
- The Greek Revolution in Chalkidiki, Serres Municipal Library
- Polygyros Municipality
