= Emmanouil Pappas (municipality) =

Emmanouil Pappas Εμμανουήλ Παππάς
- Municipality
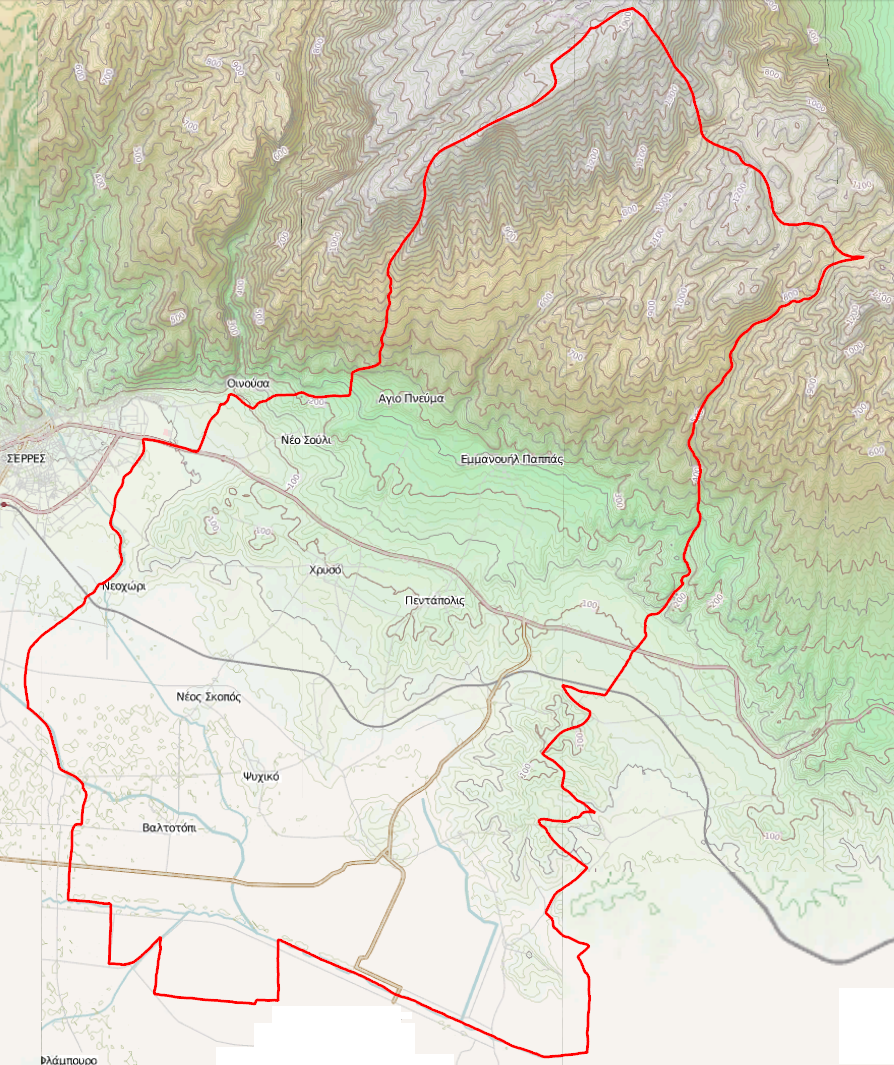

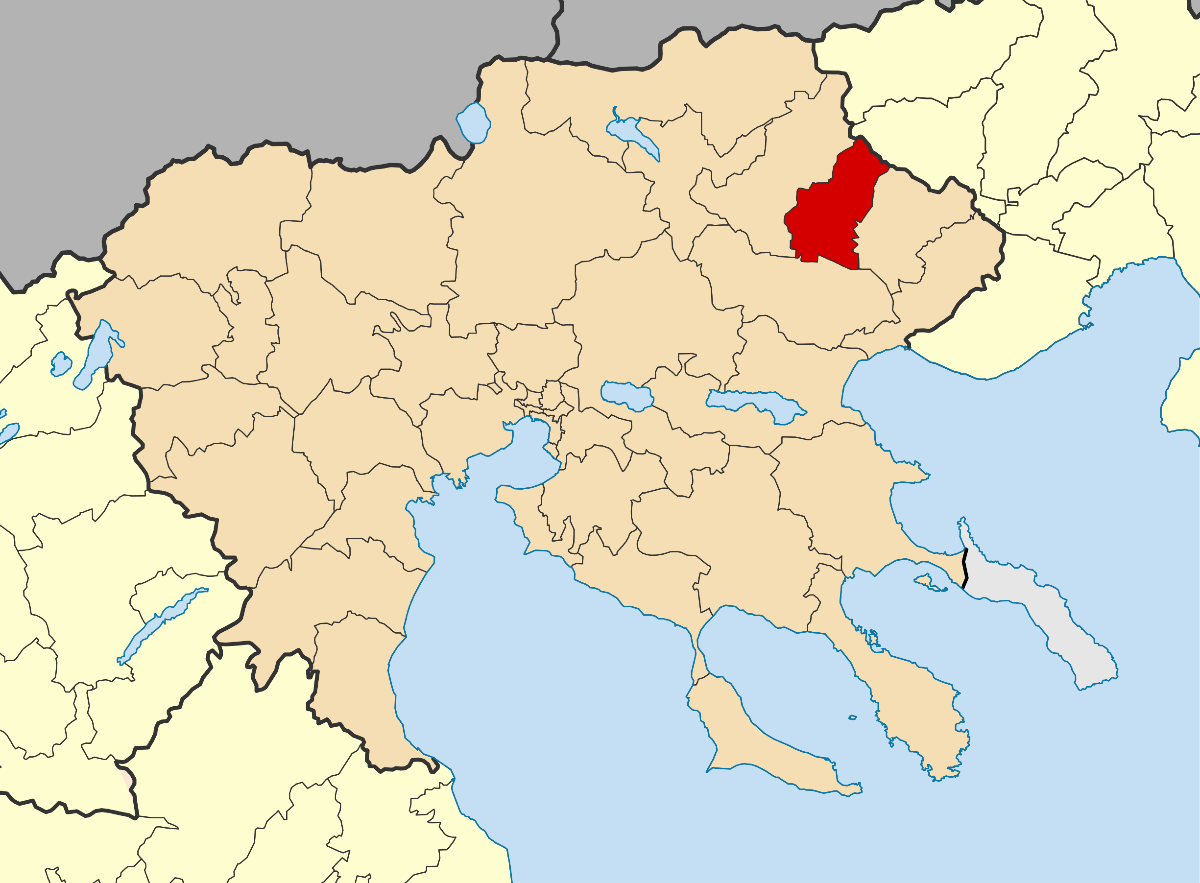

- Location within Greece
- Coordinates: 41°05′N 23°43′E
- Country: Greece
- Administrative region: Central Macedonia
- Regional unit: Serres
- Seat: Chryso

Government
  - Mayor: Dimitrios Notas (since 2014)

Area
  - Municipality: 337.9 km^{2} (130.5 sq mi)
  - Municipal unit: 217.5 km^{2} (84.0 sq mi)

Population (2021)
  - Municipality: 11,585
  - Density: 34.29/km^{2} (88.80/sq mi)
  - Municipal unit: 6,363
  - Municipal unit density: 29.26/km^{2} (75.77/sq mi)
  - Community: 475
- Time zone: UTC+2 (EET)
  - Summer (DST): UTC+3 (EEST)
- Vehicle registration: ΕΡ
- Website: edemocracy-empapas.gr

Emmanouil Pappas (Greek: Εμμανουήλ Παππάς) is a municipality in the Serres regional unit, Greece. The seat of the municipality is in Chryso. The municipality takes its name after a local historical figure who played an important part as a leader in the Greek War of Independence against Ottoman rule. Emmanouil Pappas was born in the village that was previously called Dovista (Δοβίστα), probably of Slavic origin, though historians are uncertain of the exact root of that word. One conjecture involves the mispronunciation of the Latin 'Dove est', meaning 'where is it?', because, apparently, the village was undetectable from a distance.

== Municipality ==
The municipality Emmanouil Pappas was formed at the 2011 local government reform by the merger of the following 2 former municipalities, that became municipal units:

- Emmanouil Pappas
- Strymonas

The municipality has an area of 337.922 km^{2}, the municipal unit 217.539 km^{2}. The municipal unit Emmanouil Pappas consists of the communities Agio Pnevma, Chryso, Dafnoudi, Emmanouil Pappas, Metalla, Neo Souli, Pentapoli and Toumpa.
