= Emmanouel Pappas =

Greek commander and revolutionary (1772–1821)

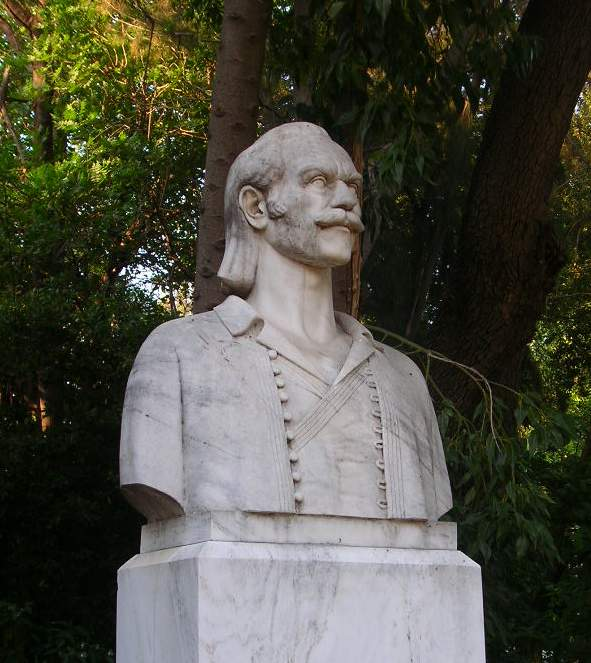
- Bust of Emmanouel Pappas in Athens
- Native name: Εμμανούηλ Παππάς
- Born: 1772; Dovista, Ottoman Empire (now Emmanouil Papas, Greece)
- Died: 5 December 1821 (aged 48–49) near Cape Caphereus, Aegean Sea
- Allegiance: Filiki Etaireia; Greek Revolutionary Army
- Conflicts: Greek War of Independence

Emmanouel Pappas (Greek: Εμμανουήλ Παππάς; 1772 – 5 December 1821) was a prominent member of Filiki Eteria and leader of the Greek War of Independence in Macedonia.

== Biography ==
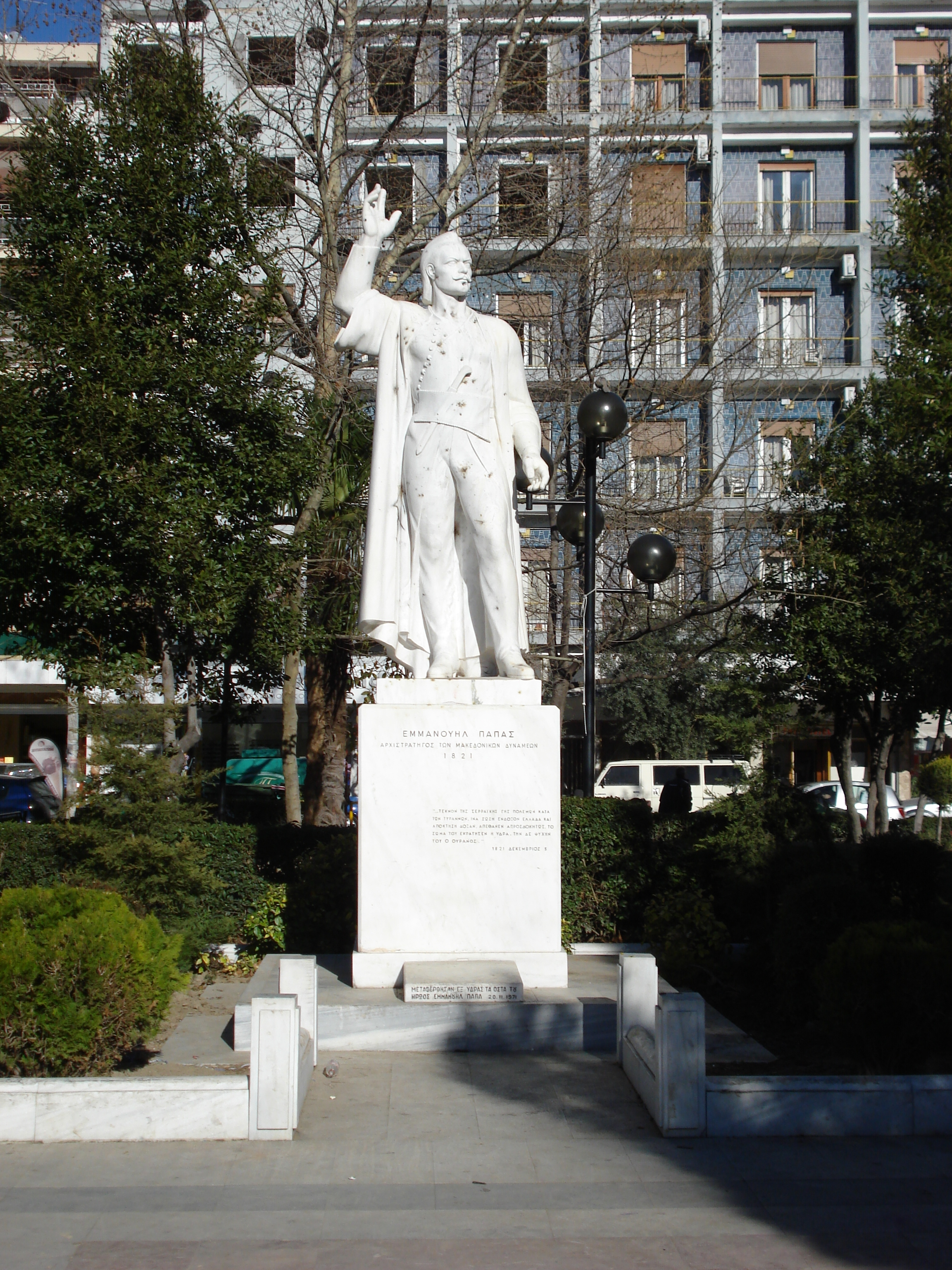
A statue of Emmanouel Pappas in Serres

Emmanouil Pappas was born in Dovista, a village in Macedonia, which is now named after him. Son of a priest, Pappas excelled in commerce and banking, not only in Macedonia, but also in Europe, establishing trading posts in Constantinople, Vienna and Budapest, despite the limited education he received.

As one of the founding members of Filiki Etaireia, after the outbreak of the War, Pappas dedicated his fortune to organising and financing guerrilla troops. In March 1821, he tried to coordinate his actions in eastern Macedonia with Anastasios Karatasos, a rebel leader in western Macedonia, hoping to unite the revolution across the region, but their actions were not well synchronized, and had little success.

== The Revolution in Macedonia ==
In Spring of 1821, he led 4,000 Macedonian fighters and landed to Chalkidiki, in Agion Oros, where on May 23 he started the Revolution, after all the leaders were grouped in the Koutloumousiou monastery. Quickly, the rise spread to Polygyros, Arnaia, Ormylia, Sithonia, and the area of Kalamaria.

Pappas was then named Leader and Defender of Macedonia and divided his force in two parts, the first under his leadership, moved towards Apollonia in order to intercept Ottoman forces moving from Constantinople and the second under Stamos Kapsas, through Arnaia and the mount Cholomon, reached Sedes outside Thessaloniki. After some impressive accomplishments in the beginning, where he managed to liberate the most part of the peninsula and even to threaten Thessaloniki, his lack of communication with Karatassos and the proximity of Chalkidiki to Thessaloniki, where massive Ottoman troops were stationed, enabled the Ottomans to move against him with large forces.

At first, Kapsas, not having enough forces to advance, retreated to Vasilika, Thessaloniki near the monastery of Saint Anastasia, where he was outflanked and overrun by superior Ottoman forces. Kapsas chose not to leave but to fight and with 68 men he put up a desperate struggle of which none survived.

Pappas was then forced to withdraw in Pallene and entrench in the ruins of ancient Potidaea, where on October 30 he was attacked by a 14,000 men corps, led personally by Mehmed Emin Pasha, Vali of Thessaloniki. Despite his efforts, the town was seized and burned, alongside many villages, however Pappas, on November with many locals, managed to sail towards Hydra, but during his trip he died of a heart attack. His defeat, along with the repression of Karatassos' revolution in Naoussa in April, 1822 marked the end of the Greek war of independence in North Greece. He is considered one of the most significant members of the Greek Revolution, being proclaimed hero of the Greek nation, during the First National Assembly at Epidaurus.

== See also ==
- Greek War of Independence
- List of Macedonians (Greek)
