= Papaflessas =

Greek patriot, priest, and government official

Archimandrite Grigorios Papaflessas Γρηγόριος Παπαφλέσσας
- Γεώργιος Δημήτριος Δικαίος-Φλέσσας
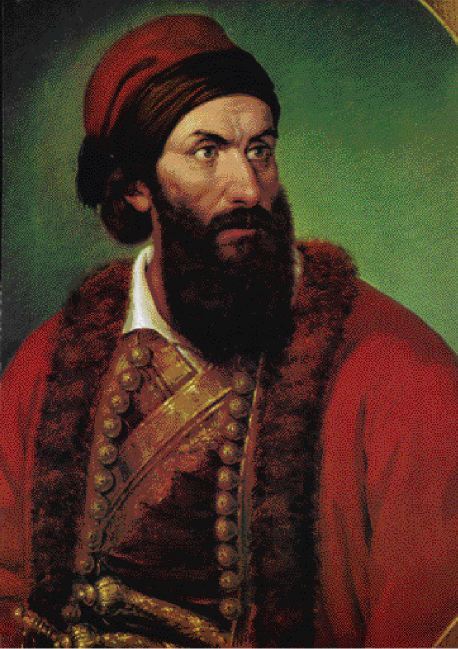
- A portrait of Papaflessas.
- Born: Georgios Dimitrios Dikaios-Flessas c. 1788; Poliani, Messinia, Ottoman Empire (now Greece)
- Died: 20 May 1825; Maniaki, Ottoman Empire (now Greece)
- Relatives: Georgios Dimitrios Flessas (grandfather); Dimitrios G. Flessas (father); Konstantina Andronaiou (mother); Nikitas Flessas (brother)
- Military career
- Allegiance: (Greece) First Hellenic Republic
- Branch: Filiki Etaireia; Greek Revolutionary Army
- Service years: 1820-1825
- Nicknames: Papaflessas (Παπαφλέσσας); Armodios (Ἁρμόδιος)
- Conflicts: Greek War of Independence: Battle of Dervenakia; Greek civil wars of 1823-1825; Battle of Maniaki †
- Other work: Minister of Internal Affairs

Grigorios Dimitrios Dikaios-Flessas (Greek: Γρηγόριος Δημήτριος Δικαίος-Φλέσσας; 1788 – 20 May 1825), popularly known as Papaflessas (Παπαφλέσσας), was a Greek priest and government official who became one of the most influential figures during the Greek War of Independence. The prefix papa- (παπα-) in the name Papaflessas indicates his status as a cleric since the word means 'priest' in Greek. He was appointed Archimandrite in 1819. He served as Minister of Internal Affairs and Chief of Police in the government of Alexander Mavrokordatos. Papaflessas was killed during the Battle of Maniaki on 20 May 1825, fighting against the forces of Ibrahim Pasha at Maniaki, Messenia.

== Name ==
Georgios Dimitrios Dikaios-Flessas was his birth name. His monastic name was Grigorios Flessas (Γρηγόριος Φλέσσας, Grigórios Flessas) or Papaflessas, while the pseudonym he used later in his life was Grigorios Papaflessas (Γρηγόριος Παπαφλέσσας).

== Early life ==
Grigorios Papaflessas was born Georgios Flessas or Flesias (Φλέσιας) in 1788 in the village of Poliani in Messinia. His father was Demetrios G. Flessas (Δημήτριος Φλέσσας), son of the klepht Georgios Dimitriou Flessas (Γεώργιος Δημητρίου Φλέσσας), and his mother, the second wife of Dimitrios, was Konstantina Andronaiou (Κωνσταντίνα Ἀνδροναίου) from Dimitsana. He was the 28th child of the Dimitrios family. In 1809, he attended the renowned school of Dimitsana, from whence many Greek national heroes graduated. While in school, he published a satire and pinned it on the door of Dimitsana Pasha (the Turkish local governor at the time) signing it "Grigorios Phos Kalamios" (Φῶς Καλάμιος τό νομα Γρηγόριος). Realizing he was in danger from his action he was sent in 1815 to become a priest or monk, taking the ecclesiastical name of Gregorios Flessas or Papaflessas. For a short time, he served in this capacity in the monastery of Velanidia, situated outside of the city of Kalamata, Messinia.

== Clergy ==
Grigorios was argumentative and defiant by nature and frequently at odds with his ecclesiastical superiors. He was an outlier known for radicalism and confrontation, perhaps "a touch of madness". Further, he was angry toward the Ottoman Turks because they had killed his family members. He also blessed a marriage of Mr. Zervas to his niece who was engaged to another man. He was asked to leave the monastery of Velanidia.

In April 1816, he moved to the monastery of Rekitsa (Ρεκίτσα), located between Leontari and Mystras. He soon argued with his superiors and the monastery's administration. He also came into conflict with a local Turkish authority over the boundaries of the monastery property and even used armed men to protect his claims. This eventually was settled by court in Tripolitsa with the court finding in Papaflessas' and the monastery's favour. This angered the Turkish official who told the authorities that Papaflessas was a revolutionary and was arming the rayahs against the Turks. The Tripolitsa authorities sentenced Papaflessas to death and sent soldiers to the monastery to arrest and execute him. Armed Poliani fighters delayed the soldiers and Papaflessas was able to leave his homeland, saying as he did so that he would return either a bishop or a pasha and deal with them.

Papaflessas went to the Ionian island of Zakynthos, a haven for Greeks from the mainland who were under death sentence by the Turks; the Ionian islands were under the protection of other empires. There he met fellow Greek future revolutionist Theodoros Kolokotronis. He obtained a reference letter from the Archbishop of Christianoupolis (Arcadia Kyparissia). While traveling by sea to Constantinople, Papaflessas was shipwrecked on Mount Athos during which the seal on his letter of recommendation broke. Reading the letter he was surprised to find that it called him dishonest, immoral and untrustworthy, causing him to discard the letter.

He arrived in Constantinople with the goal of studying Ancient Greek and theology and to become an archbishop in the patriarchy of Agia Sofia. While studying Greek and the Periklis harangue, he also started meeting prominent "patriots". Because he was under death sentence by the Turks, and due to his reputation from Peloponnisos, he used the name Dikaios. He soon joined the secret organization Filiki Eteria with the code name Armodios (A. M.), Ἁρμόδιος, and the number five (5). In an important meeting of Filiki Eteria's leadership in the town of Izmail in October 1820, he was the only Morean in attendance, and freely spoke on behalf of all Moreans, saying they were willing and ready to begin the uprising. When he arrived in the Morea later and told the Morean notables that they were expected to rebel, neither he nor his tidings were well received.

In 1819, Gregorios was ordained to the highest priesthood position, archimandrite, a rank next to bishop, by Patriarch Gregorios V of Constantinople and he was given the ecclesiastical "officio of Dikaios" (the Ecumenical Patriarch's representative), in order to be able to move freely in the Moldovlachia area and not to be bothered by the Turks. Papaflessas was sent to the northern part of the Ottoman Empire to inspire and spread hope among his countrymen for the nation's independence from the Turks.

== Action in Resistance ==
Returning to Constantinople from his successful mission, Papaflessas again came to the attention of the Turkish authorities and had to flee. At the end of 1820, he sailed to Aivali in Asia Minor and catechized all scholars of the Big School (as it was called there) while awaiting the arrival of war supplies from Smyrna. From Smyrna he received military supplies and the assurance of additional ammunition if needed.

Papaflessas traveled to several areas seeking support for a revolution against the Ottoman Empire. At the Saint George monastery he called a meeting of Greek authorities and high priests to discuss if the time was right to start the a revolution. After heated arguments the meeting was postponed for a later time in the monastery of Agia Lavra.

In January 1821 meetings took place with Papaflessas recounting his supplies and assurances of support coming from Russia. Concerns about the practicalities of war and the uncertainty of the promises of military support led the other participants to propose to secretly jail Flessas in the monastery of Agia Lavra in order to avoid problems for the nation. But Papaflessas had armed supporters and no one dared arrest him. The synod decided to get further information and the opinion of neighbouring countries before starting a revolution.

Flessas' problem was with the upper class (landowners) in the villages and municipalities, including the top echelon of the clergy, who did not trust Papaflessas, and his mission was received with a great deal of skepticism and fear. He felt safer to first approach farmers and peasants, and the poor class of people who were easily magnetized by his speeches looked upon him as the messiah of their freedom.

After the meeting he went to Kalavryta and met with Nikolaos Souliotis and Asimakis Skaltsas in order for them to write a letter in the first ten days of March 1821 to Oikonomos Eliopoulos. Then he retreated to Kalyvia, Messenia, waiting for news from Souliotis and Skaltsas and the arrival in Almyros, a small port near Kalamata, of the boat with the war supplies. From Kalyvia he went secretly to Gardikion (now Amfeia), near his hometown of Poliani, and learned that the small boat of Mexis Poriotis arrived in Almyros. Papaflessas immediately called his brothers, and Nikitas Flessas, the oldest brother, received the ammunition.

In March 1821, he received news the ship with military supplies had arrived. He gathered about 400 men with mules and donkeys from the Poliani area and went to Almyros Kalamata. In order to unload the boat they had to have the authorization of the area's harbourmaster, the famous Mavromichalis, who was in the pay of the Turks' security force. The harbourmaster demanded a large bribe to cover up what the Greeks were unloading.

Papaflessas sent 45,000 grosia to Mavromichalis who accepted it but still did not sign the proper papers. He wanted half of the supplies in the boat to have them as reserves to fight the Greeks when they started the revolution against the Turks. This was agreed to and the supplies were transported to the monastery of Velanidia, where Papaflessas served as a monk, summoning prominent klephts, chieftains from the area. By purpose or accident some of the gunpowder was dropped at a local well and the next day the stablemen of the local pasha found and reported it. The pasha summoned all the prominent Greeks and clergy from the Kalamata area and jailed them.

Papaflessas arranged his men to cover various strategic positions in the area. When a Turkish sympathizer tried to leave the city he was killed, starting the revolution prematurely on 21 March 1821. The Filiki Eteria had decided at their meeting in Izmail to start the revolution on 25 March 1821, but received news on the 22nd that the fighting had already begun. The Greek War of Independence is still considered to have officially started on 25 March 1821 (intentionally coinciding with the Feast of the Annunciation) and brought a great change to the church of the free kingdom. The clergy had taken a leading part in the revolution.

== Papaflessas during the Revolution (1821–1825) ==
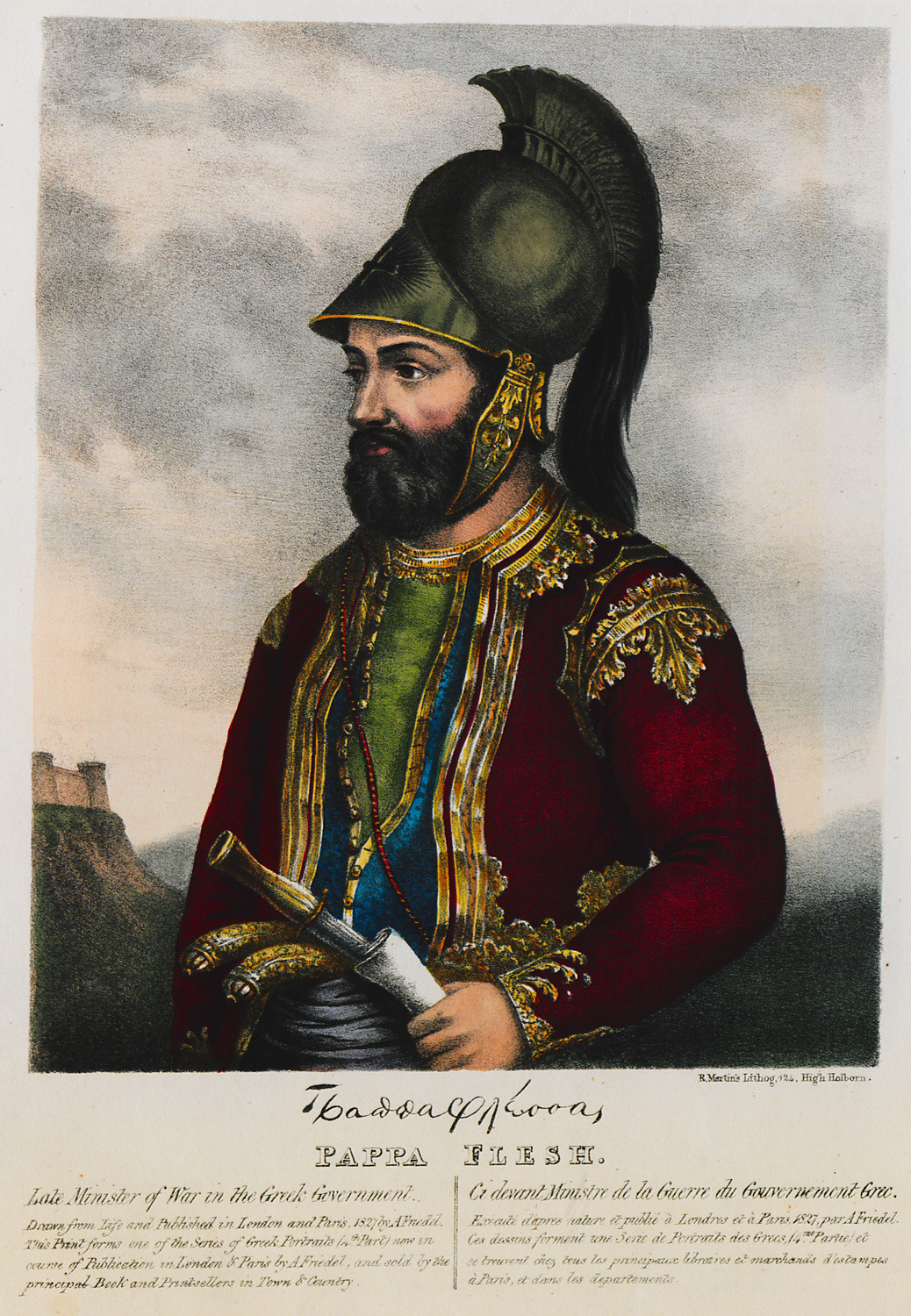
Papaflessas by Adam Friedel

In 1823, Papaflessas was named the Minister of Internal Affairs and the Chief of Police by the government of Prince Alexander Mavrokordato under the name Gregorios Dikaios, the name he had when he was in Filiki Etairia. He instituted many reforms, established the mail system and built schools in various towns. He created the title of Inspector General for schools and he was the first to establish a political conviction certificate to be given to the friends of the government. He took part in many battles against the Turks and he sided with the government when the civil war started in 1824. He took part in the campaign in Messinia and the rest of the Peloponnese to suppress the rebels against the provisional government. During the civil war, he was initially on Theodoros Kolokotronis' side, but later switched sides due to his personal ambitions. This was not uncommon among the warring Greeks.

Slavery

It was not uncommon for the Greeks to take Muslim captives as slaves during the revolts, as retribution for their own enslavement at Ottoman hands and as war booty. Muslims who were not killed outright or able to flee were sold among notables, soldiers, and even peasants. Muslims from prominent Turkish families could buy back their loved ones for high ransom and these funds were used to finance the Greeks' campaign; so, these especially valuable individuals were intentionally sought. Papaflessas had his own slaves; his Muslim concubine and their children traveled with him.

The fight against Ibrahim

When Ibrahim Pasha invaded the Peloponnese in 1825 (with an army consisting mostly of Egyptians), Papaflessas was still Minister of Internal Affairs. Realizing the great danger the nation was facing with the Ibrahim's invasion, he demanded the government grant amnesty to Kolokotronis and other political prisoners. This demand was refused and he appeared before the executive branch and parliament to tell them he would go to Messinia alone to organize a resistance against Ibrahim, determined to return victorious or die in the battlefield.

George Finlay writes in his book, “The archimandrite Daikaios (Pappa Phlessas) was still Minister of the Interior. He was the most unprincipled man of the party of the Moreot chiefs. The universal indignation now expressed at his conducts convinced him that it would be dangerous for him to remain in Nauplia, where his licentious life and gross peculation pointed him out as the first object of popular vengeance, and the scapegoat for the sins of his colleagues. The archimandrite was destitute of private virtue and political honesty, but he was a man of activity and courage. Perhaps too, at this decisive moment a sense of shame urged him to cancel his previous misdeeds by an act of patriotism. He asked permission of the government to march against the Egyptians, boasting that he would vanquish Ibrahim or perish in the combat”.

Papaflessas gathered 3,000 poorly armed men and went to the province of Pylia, Messinia, searching for the best spot to face Ibrahim's army coming out of the city of Pylos. He selected the hills of Maniaki in order for him to have a better view of the enemy's movements and there Papaflessas established three lines of defence. On 20 May 1825 Ibrahim's forces, led by well-trained French officers, attacked Papaflessas' defence lines. Most of the Greek troops lost their nerve, abandoned their positions, and fled. Papaflessas continued to fight the Egyptians with a small force of 300-600 men loyal to him and his cause.

Papaflessas knew that in choosing to face Ibrahim he would die on the battlefield. Papaflessas's defenses were ultimately broken by the heavy bombardment of Ibrahim's artillery and the repeated attacks of his infantry and cavalry. Fierce hand-to-hand fighting ended with the death of the last defender.

After Papaflessa's death from a bullet in the chest, Ibrahim ordered that his body be cleaned of blood and dirt and tied to a tree. After a few minutes of looking at his foe, Ibrahim walked up to the corpse and kissed it on the cheek as a sign of extreme respect. In speaking of Papaflessas after his death, it is said that Ibrahim told his officers: "If Greece had ten heroes like him, it would not have been possible for me to undertake the military campaign against the Peloponnese".

== Legacy ==
Papaflessas remains a key revolutionary figure in Greek history and places and events have been named in his honour. Such instances include an annual international athletics meeting in Kalamata called Papaflessia and a former municipality in the Peloponnese called Papaflessas

== See also ==
- History of Greece
