= Neo Souli, Serres =

Village in Central Macedonia, Greece

Neo Souli Νέο Σούλι
- Community
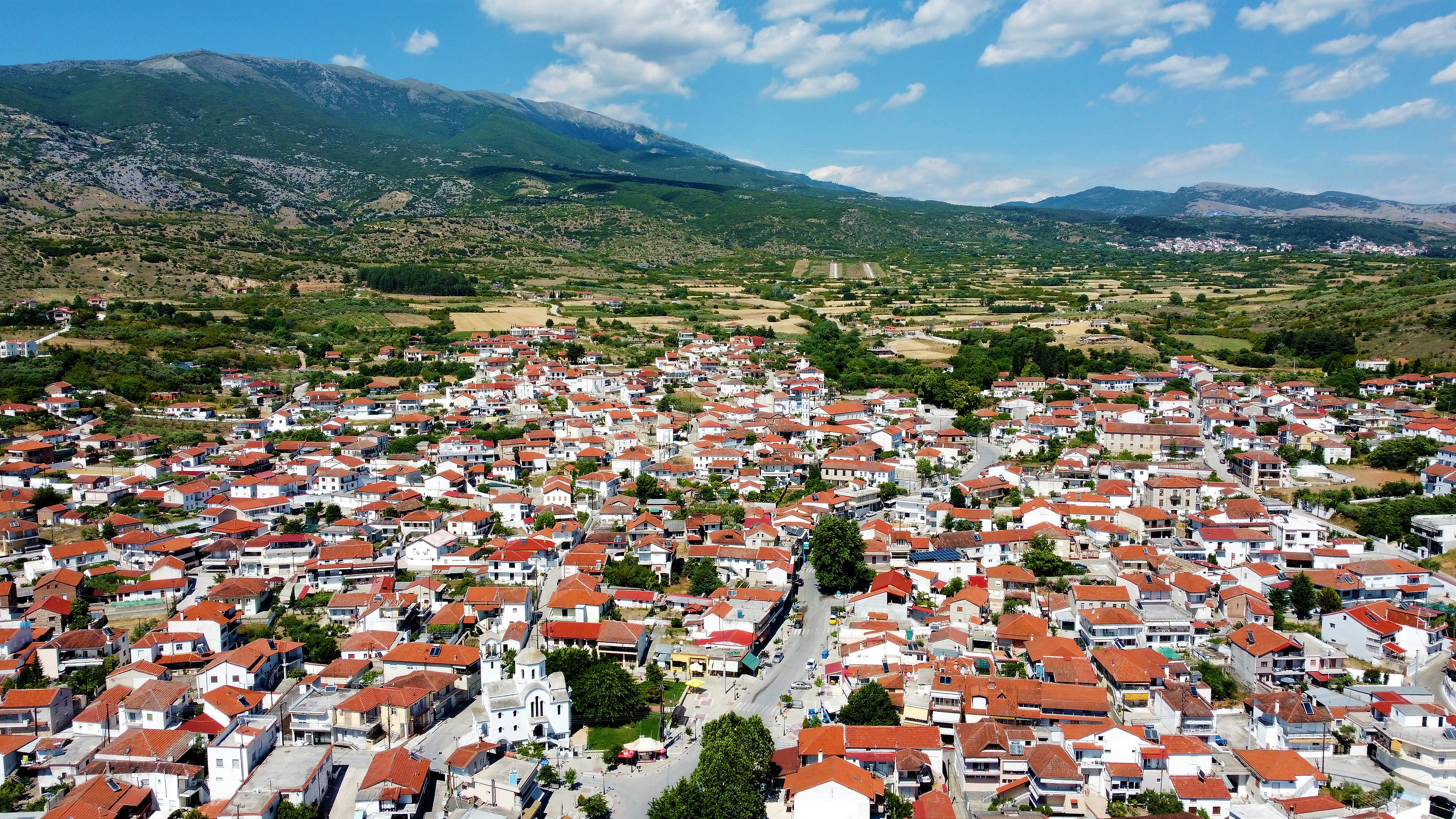

- Location within Greece
- Coordinates: 41°05′38″N 23°38′35″E
- Country: Greece
- Administrative region: Central Macedonia
- Regional unit: Serres
- Municipality: Emmanouil Pappas
- Municipal unit: Emmanouil Pappas

Population (2021)
  - Community: 2,051
- Time zone: UTC+2 (EET)
  - Summer (DST): UTC+3 (EEST)

Neo Souli (Greek: Νέο Σούλι) is a village in Serres regional unit of Central Macedonia, located 7 km (4.3 mi) east of Serres. Since the 2011 administrative reform it is a municipal unit of the municipality Emmanouil Pappas. It has a population of 2,051 inhabitants (2021) and until 1928 it was named Soumpaskioi.

== History ==
At the southeastern end of Neo Souli, on the "Agrianista" hill, has been found an ancient settlement, with continuous habitation from prehistoric to modern years.

In Roman times the settlement belonged to the territory ("chora") of the city of Sirra (modern Serres), from which it was administratively dependent. South of Neo Souli the ancient necropolis was extended, where various archaeological findings (vases, reliefs, coins etc.) were found, as well as Greek inscriptions of the Roman imperial period.

== See also ==
List of settlements in the Serres regional unit
