= Maniaki, Messenia =

Maniaki Μανιάκι
- Community
- Location within Greece
- Coordinates: 37°04′35″N 21°46′21″E
- Country: Greece
- Administrative region: Peloponnese
- Regional unit: Messenia
- Municipality: Pylos-Nestoras
- Municipal unit: Nestoras

Population (2021)
  - Community: 44
- Time zone: UTC+2 (EET)
  - Summer (DST): UTC+3 (EEST)

Maniaki (Greek: Μανιάκι) is a village in the municipality Pylos–Nestoras, Messenia, Greece. It was the place where the Battle of Maniaki occurred on 1 June 1825.
