= Androusa =

Androusa Ανδρούσα
- Municipal unit
- Location within the regional unit

- Location within Greece
- Coordinates: 37°07′N 21°56′E
- Country: Greece
- Administrative region: Peloponnese
- Regional unit: Messenia
- Municipality: Messini

Area
  - Municipal unit: 50.514 km^{2} (19.504 sq mi)

Population (2021)
  - Municipal unit: 1,800
  - Municipal unit density: 36/km^{2} (92/sq mi)
  - Community: 522
- Time zone: UTC+2 (EET)
  - Summer (DST): UTC+3 (EEST)
- Vehicle registration: ΚΜ

Androusa (Greek: Ανδρούσα) is a village and a former municipality in Messenia, Peloponnese, Greece. Since the 2011 local government reform it is part of the municipality Messini, of which it is a municipal unit. The municipal unit has an area of 50.514 km^{2}. Predominantly a farming region, the principal exports include kalamata olives, olive oil, and livestock. It is located 22 km north-west of the regional capital Kalamata. Municipal unit population 1,800 (2021), village population 522 (2021).

== History ==
Androusa is recorded as being founded by William II of Villehardouin during the mid 13th century. This was the same period as when the Androusa fortress/castle is thought to have been built, of which city walls and partially ruined towers remain on the village's eastern perimeter overlooking the Pamisos River and the Messenian plain. There are alternate theories pointing to an earlier (and possible Byzantine) construction due to certain design elements of the fortress walls. Later in the 14th century, Androusa developed into an important religions seat, becoming the base of the Episcopal with the Decree of Patriarch Athanasios (1304–1310) who was from the village. After recapture by the Byzantines, it later became part of the Ottoman Empire as with the majority of the Peloponnese after the fall of Constantinople, and largely remained this way until liberation in the Greek War of Independence.

More recently, Androusa has become a regional agricultural center for the area where olives, olive oil, figs, raisins, and wine are produced, sold, and exported.

A number of historic constructions and locations in and around Androusa still contain evidence of its Byzantine past:

- Ruins of a medieval castle fortification (formerly known as the Castle of Druges): commenced by William II of Villehardouin or the Byzantines around the 13th century, of which the outside fortification enclosure and several ruined turret towers remain. Traces of marble constructions dating to the Roman, post-Roman, or Latin Empire era are also revealed on the inner part of the fortification.
- The Monastery of Saint George Isodomous: dating back to around the 11th century, this modest construction is possibly the best preserved Byzantine-era building within the village. Some roof restoration work has been completed in recent years;
- The Church of Saint Samarina: dating back to the 11th and 12th centuries, another modest construction among the most significant Byzantine constructions in the area as it is well preserved and showcases multiple well known Byzantine architectural elements (3 km north);
- The abandoned monastery of Andronikos (a Byzantine emperor) in Maganiako, 10 km north-west.
