= Battle of Amphipolis =

Military investment of Amphipolis by Sparta (422 BC)

Coordinates: 40°49′25″N 23°50′49″E

- Part of the Peloponnesian War
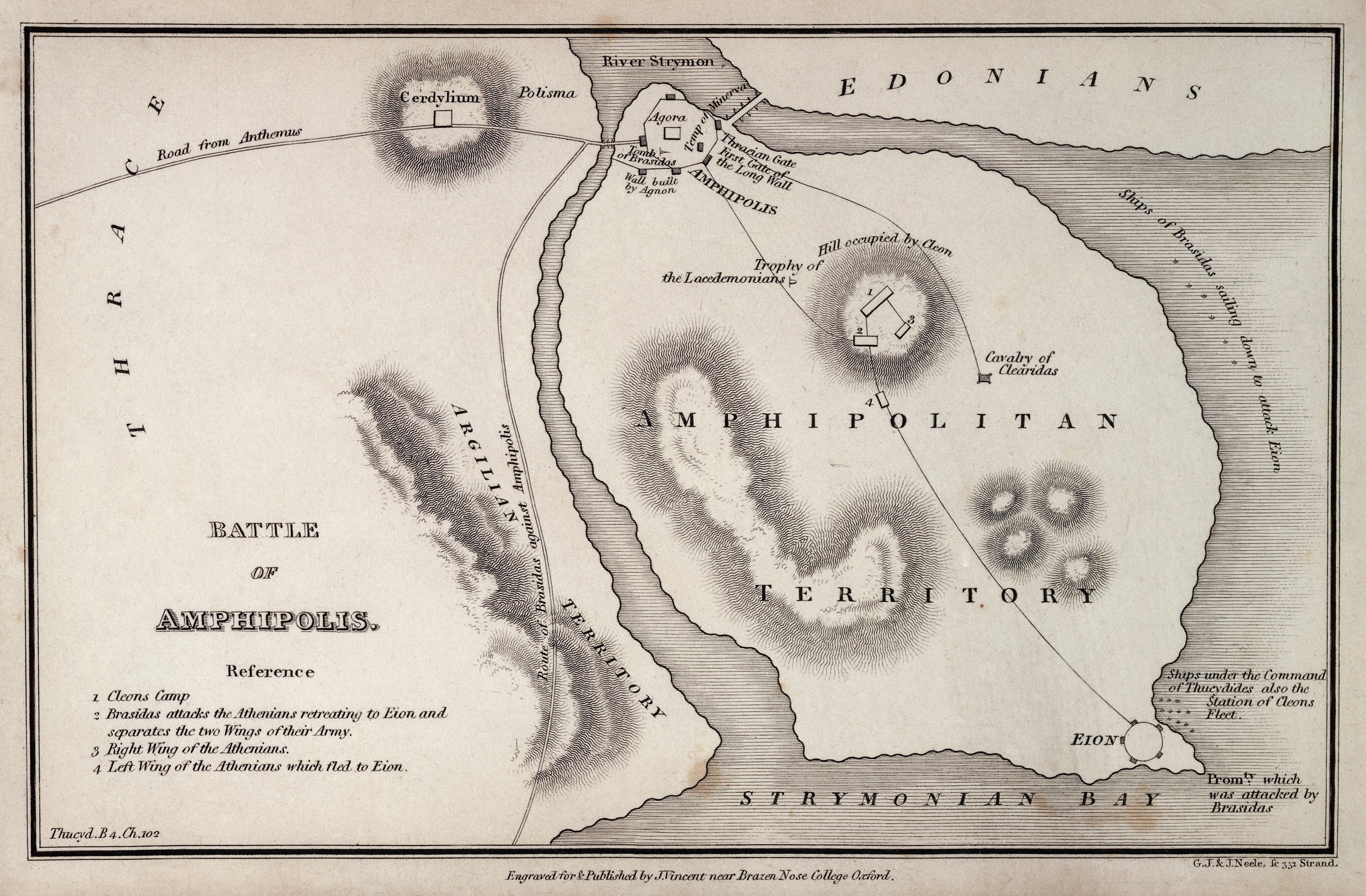
- An 1825 map illustrating the battle arrangements according to Thucydides
Date	422 BC
Location	Amphipolis
Result	Spartan victory

Belligerents
Athens	Sparta

Commanders and leaders
Cleon †; Thucydides; Eucles	Brasidas †; Clearidas

Strength
About 2,000	About 2,500

Casualties and losses
About 600	7
- Greece

The Battle of Amphipolis was fought in 422 BC during the Peloponnesian War between Athens and Sparta. It was the culmination of events that began in 424 BC with the capture of Amphipolis by the Spartans.

== Prelude ==
In 424 BC, in response to the Athenian harassments of the Peloponnese from Pylos and Cythera after the Battle of Pylos, Spartan general Brasidas gained permission to take an army north to attack Athenian holdings in Thrace. Brasidas gathered an army of 700 helots armed as hoplites and 1,000 mercenary hoplites from the Peloponnese near Corinth. After foiling an Athenian attempt to capture Megara, Brasidas marched his army through Thessaly and linked up with Perdiccas II of Macedon, one of Sparta's northern allies. In late August, the Brasidians arrived at and took Acanthus on the Chalcidice. Early December 424, Brasidas set out for his main objective: Amphipolis.

== Capture of Amphipolis, 424–423 BC ==
In the winter of 424–423, around the same time as the Battle of Delium, Brasidas besieged Amphipolis, an Athenian colony in Thrace on the Strymon river. The city was defended by the Athenian general Eucles, who sent for help from Thucydides (at that point a general, later a famous historian), who was at Thasos with seven Athenian ships.

In order to capture the city before Thucydides arrived, Brasidas offered to let everyone who wished to stay keep their property, and offered safe passage to those who wanted to leave. Amphipolis surrendered, despite protests from Eucles. Thucydides arrived at the nearby port of Eion on the same day the city surrendered, and defended it with help from those who had left Amphipolis. Meanwhile, Brasidas began to ally with more Thracian towns and attack other towns in the area, such as Torone. The Athenians were afraid that their other allies would quickly capitulate, as the Amphipolitans had, if Brasidas offered them favourable terms of peace.

Thucydides, who recounted the capture of Amphipolis in his History of the Peloponnesian War, is often considered to be partially or entirely responsible for the fall of Amphipolis. Some have seen his actions as "gross negligence," although he claimed he was unable to arrive in time to save the city. He was recalled to Athens, where he was tried and exiled.

== Armistice of 423 BC ==
In response to the fall of the city, Athens and Sparta signed an armistice. Athens hoped they could fortify more towns in preparation for future attacks from Brasidas, and the Spartans hoped Athens would finally return the prisoners taken at the Battle of Sphacteria earlier in 425 BC. According to the terms of the truce, "It is proposed that each side should remain in its own territory, holding what it now holds...The armistice is to last for one year." While the negotiations were going on, Brasidas captured Scione and refused to give it back when news of the treaty arrived. The Athenian leader Cleon sent a force to take it back, despite the treaty.

== Second Battle of Amphipolis, 422 BC ==
When the armistice ended in 422, Cleon arrived in Thrace with a force of 30 ships, 1,200 hoplites, and 300 cavalry, along with many other troops from Athens' allies. He recaptured Torone and Scione; at Torone, the Spartan commander Pasitelidas was taken captive back to Athens. Cleon then took up position at Eion, while Brasidas took his position at Cerdylion, a nearby elevated settlement on the other side of the Strymon (also Latinized as Cerdylium). Brasidas had about 2,000 hoplites and 300 cavalry, plus some other troops in Amphipolis, but he did not feel that he could defeat Cleon in a pitched battle. Brasidas then moved his forces back into Amphipolis and prepared to attack; when Cleon realized an attack was coming, and being reluctant to fight before expected reinforcements arrived, he began to retreat; the retreat was badly arranged and Brasidas attacked boldly against a disorganised enemy, achieving victory.

In an excerpt of Brasidas' brief pre-battle speech, he specially addressed the allied Lacedaemonian forces, whom he assigned under Clearidas leadership, while for himself he handpicked a hundred and fifty hoplites; he said: "..bear in mind that the three virtues of a good soldier are zeal in battle, sense of honor and obedience to the leaders..and I will reveal that I will conduct myself in action following the advice I give to my comrades."

In the rout that followed, Brasidas was mortally injured, although the Athenians did not realize it. Cleon was also killed when he was attacked by troops under the Spartan commander Clearidas. The entire Athenian army fled back to Eion, although about 600 of them were killed before they reached the port. Only seven soldiers were killed on the Spartan side.

== Results ==
Brasidas lived long enough to learn of his victory, and was honorably buried in the agora area of Amphipolis. The Amphipolitans began to regard him as a hero, instituting games and yearly offerings in his honour. They also made him the city's founder and dedicated it to him, pulling down the buildings which Hagnon the Athenian had erected and destroying any memorials which might have remained to future time of his foundation. After the battle, neither the Athenians nor the Spartans wanted to continue the war (Cleon being the most hawkish member from Athens), and the Peace of Nicias was signed in 421 BC. This treaty was also eventually broken. Thucydides was exiled for his failure to protect Amphipolis, thus ending the period of the war in which he directly participated.

Ch. Koukouli-Chrysanthaki in her three decade research at Amphipolis offers evidence of the recovery and identification of Brasidas' burial at the ancient Amphipolis' agora. An archaeological dig at Amphipolis unearthed the foundations of a small building, and a cist grave containing the remains of a silver ossuary accompanied by a gold wreath, believed to hold the remains of Brasidas. This ossuary is currently located in the Archaeological Museum of Amphipolis. The grave itself was a hole dug into the existing rock, with limestone blocks and mortar used to create the cist grave.

In Plato's Apology, the philosopher Socrates claims to be a veteran of this battle.

== Sources ==
- Agelarakis, A. “Physical anthropological report on the cremated human remains of an individual retrieved from the Amphipolis agora”, In “Excavating Classical Amphipolis” by Ch. Koukouli-Chrysantkai, <Excavating Classical Culture> (eds.) Stamatopoulou M., and M., Yeroulanou, BAR International Series 1031, 2002
- Kagan, Donald, The Archidamian War, Cornell University Press, 1974.
- Plato. Apology.
- Thucydides, The Peloponnesian War. London, J. M. Dent; New York, E. P. Dutton. 1910.
