= Palaiokomi =

Palaiokomi Παλαιοκώμη
- Community
- Location within Greece
- Coordinates: 40°52′17″N 23°54′6″E
- Country: Greece
- Administrative region: Central Macedonia
- Regional unit: Serres
- Municipality: Amphipolis
- Municipal unit: Amphipolis

Population (2021)
  - Community: 1,195
- Time zone: UTC+2 (EET)
  - Summer (DST): UTC+3 (EEST)
- Vehicle registration: ΕΡ

Palaiokomi (Greek: Παλαιοκώμη) is a village in the municipality of Amphipolis in the regional unit of Serres. It is the second largest village of the municipality of Amphipolis in terms of population (1,195 inhabitants in 2021), after Rodolivos.

== See also ==
- List of settlements in the Serres regional unit
