= Dinocrates =

Ancient Greek architect and adviser to Alexander the Great

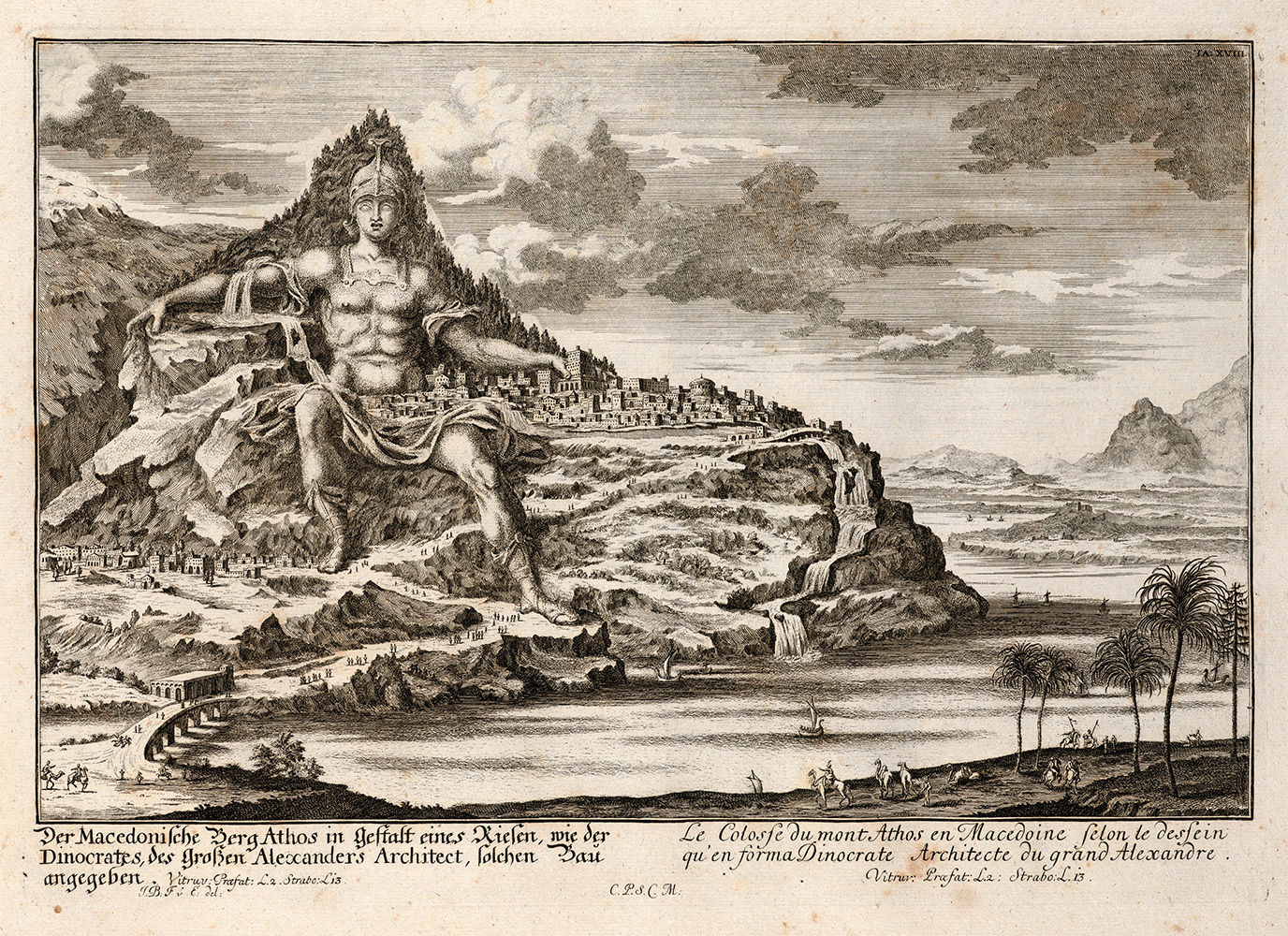
Modern engraving of Dinocrates' proposal for Mount Athos.

Dinocrates of Rhodes (also Deinocrates, Dimocrates, Cheirocrates and Stasicrates; Ancient Greek: Δεινοκράτης ὁ Ῥόδιος, fl. late 4th century BC) was a Greek architect and technical adviser to Alexander the Great. He is remembered for his plan of Alexandria, the monumental funeral pyre for Hephaestion, and the reconstruction of the Temple of Artemis at Ephesus. Ancient sources and modern historians, including Will Durant in The Story of Civilization, emphasize his role in shaping the architectural vision of Alexander’s empire.

== City proposal of Mount Athos ==
Dinocrates is noted by Vitruvius, in his treatise De Architectura, for proposing to sculpt Mount Athos into a colossal statue of a man. The figure would hold a city in one hand and pour a river into the sea with the other. Alexander rejected the plan, as Dinocrates had not considered agricultural needs for the inhabitants. The fertile Nile delta site of Alexandria was chosen instead.

== Plan of Alexandria ==
In 332 BC, Alexander appointed Dinocrates to direct the surveying and urban planning of Alexandria. The city was laid out on a Hippodamian plan, with wide streets intersecting at right angles. Dinocrates worked alongside Cleomenes of Naucratis and Crates of Olynthus, who designed the waterworks and sewer system. Durant notes that Alexandria’s rational grid plan contrasted sharply with the irregular streets of older Greek cities, symbolizing Alexander’s ambition to impose order and grandeur on his empire.

== Pyre of Hephaestion ==
In Babylon, Dinocrates designed the funerary monument for Alexander’s closest companion, Hephaestion, who died in 324 BC. Ancient writers including Diodorus Siculus, Arrian, Strabo, and Plutarch describe the pyre as a gilded, six‑story structure imitating a Babylonian ziggurat. Durant remarks that the pyre was “a mountain of gold and stone, raised to honor friendship as much as conquest.”

== Second Temple of Artemis ==
Dinocrates contributed to the reconstruction of the Temple of Artemis at Ephesus, one of the Seven Wonders of the Ancient World, after its destruction by Herostratus in 356 BC. The temple was rebuilt on a grander scale, coinciding with the birth year of Alexander.

== Other works ==
Dinocrates also worked on an unfinished funerary monument for Philip II of Macedon, Alexander’s father. He is credited with city plans and temples in Delphi, Delos, and other Greek centers. Some archaeologists have suggested he may have been involved in the design of the Casta Tomb at Amphipolis, discovered in 2012.

== Legacy ==
Dinocrates is remembered as one of antiquity’s most imaginative architects. His works combined technical skill with symbolic grandeur, aligning architecture with Alexander’s vision of empire. Will Durant observed that “in Dinocrates, Alexander found an architect equal to his dreams, one who could translate ambition into stone and city.”
