= Mikro Souli =

Mikro Souli Μικρό Σούλι
- Community
- Location within Greece
- Coordinates: 40°53′25″N 23°56′40″E
- Country: Greece
- Administrative region: Central Macedonia
- Regional unit: Serres
- Municipality: Amphipolis
- Municipal unit: Rodolivos

Population (2021)
  - Community: 334
- Time zone: UTC+2 (EET)
  - Summer (DST): UTC+3 (EEST)

Mikro Souli (Greek: Μικρό Σούλι) is a semi-mountainous village (altitude 300 m.) in Serres regional unit of Central Macedonia, Greece, located 60 km southeast of the city of Serres. Since the 2011 local government reform it is a part (municipal unit) of the municipality of Amphipolis. It has a population of 334 inhabitants (2021). Its former name was "Semalto" (probably from the Latin words "semi-" and "altus")

== History ==
A little further west of Mikro Souli, on the hill "Zavarnikia", were revealed traces of an ancient settlement, which was located on the via Egnatia, as presumed by the discovery of a Roman miliarium. On the next hill of "Agia Marina" there was a prehistoric settlement. Thus, taking also into account the ruins of early Christian basilicas, it is concluded that the area of these two hills was continuously inhabited from prehistoric to Byzantine times. In 13th century the settlement was given as a gift to the Vatopedi monastery in Athos mountain by the bulgarian tsar John Asen II. The settlement was mentioned in royal hrisovoulis under the name Semalto.
