= Hermagoras of Amphipolis =

Stoic philosopher

Hermagoras of Amphipolis (Greek: Ἑρμαγόρας ὁ Ἀμφιπολίτης) (3rd century BC) was a Stoic philosopher, student of Cypriot Persaeus, in the court of Antigonus II Gonatas. He wrote several dialogues, among them a Misokyōn (Μισοκύων, Dog-hater, Cynic-hater); one volume On Misfortunes; Έκχυτος Ekchytos (about egg-divining); On Sophistry addressed to the Academics. None of his works are known to survive.
