= Archaeological Museum of Amphipolis =

Museum in Amphipolis, Greece

Coordinates: 40.825216°N 23.848653°E

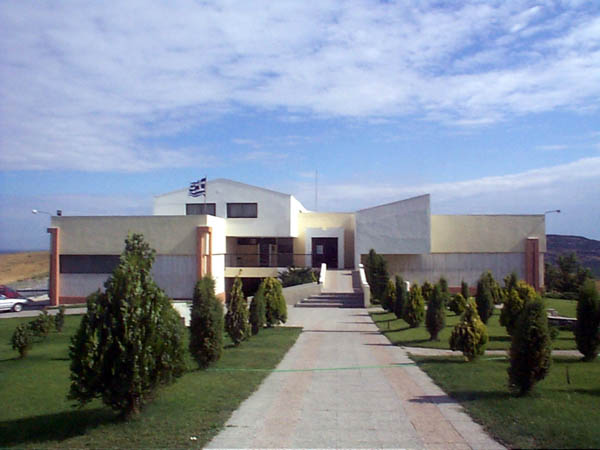
Outside view

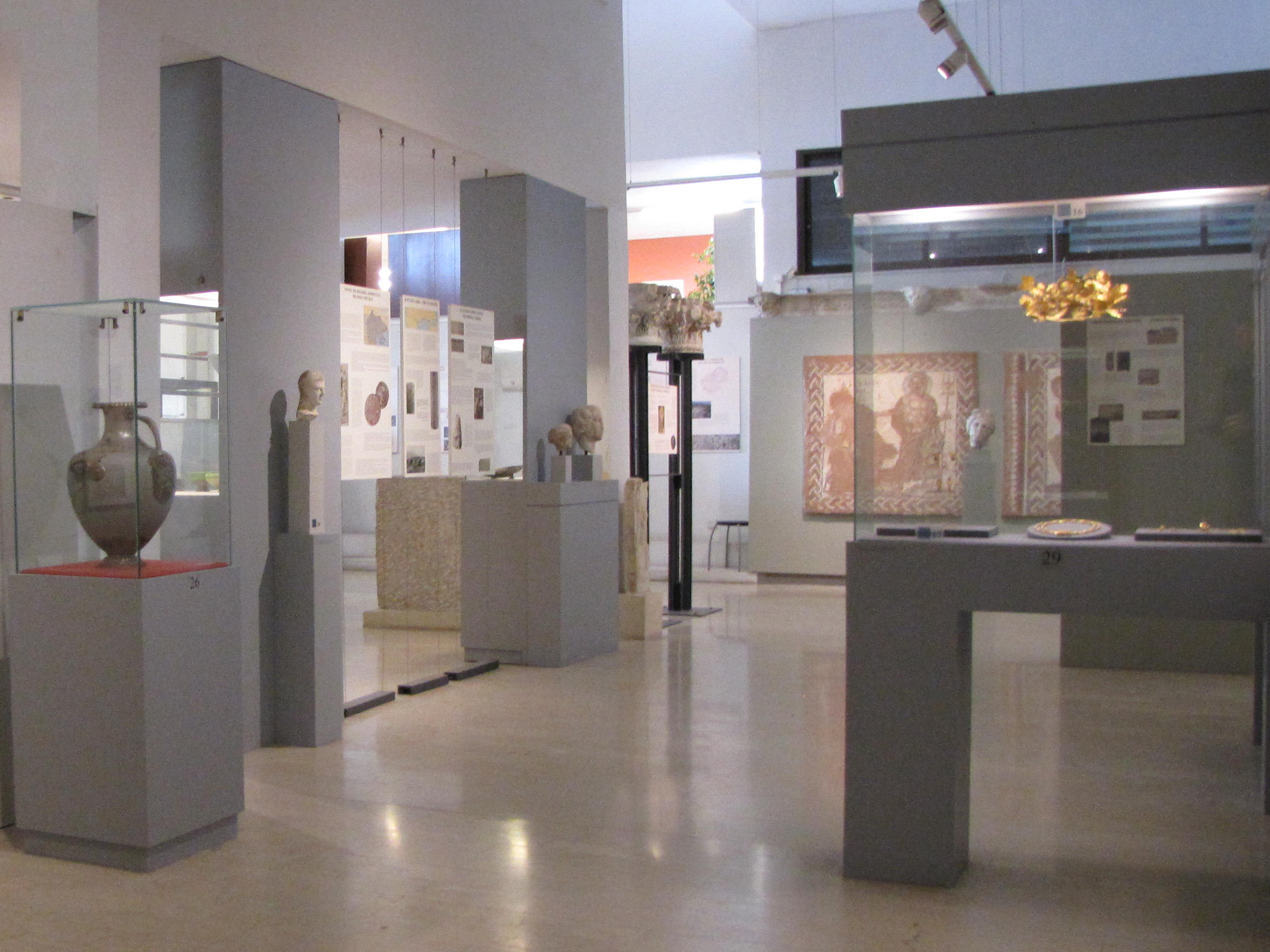
Museum of Amphipolis (Basement)

The Archaeological Museum of Amphipolis is a museum in Amphipolis, Central Macedonia, Greece. It is located in the archaeological site of ancient Amphipolis (a city founded in 437 BC), near the River Strymon and close to the Thessaloniki–Kavala national highway and within the walls of the ancient city itself.

In the museum, finds from Amphipolis and its surroundings from the Archaic to Byzantine periods are exhibited. Artefacts were found in sanctuaries, settlements and tombs. The excavations took place mainly from 1956 to 1984, under the direction of the late archaeologist Dimitris Lazaridis. After his death in 1985 his daughter, Calliope Lazaridis, continued the work until 1989.

The construction of the museum occurred between 1984 and 1995. The two-storey building contains exhibition spaces, offices, a conference room and a warehouse.

The collection also includes finds from ancient Argilos and Eion, the port of ancient Amphipolis, together with wall panels relating the history of ancient Amphipolis and the surrounding area. Documentary collections include correspondence from 18th-century historians about ancient Amphipolis, as well as photographs of the unearthing and restoration of the Lion of Amphipolis in 1913.

== Location ==
The museum is located about 600 meters north of the acropolis, right at the entrance to the modern village of Amfipoli.

== Arrangement of the finds ==
=== Basement ===
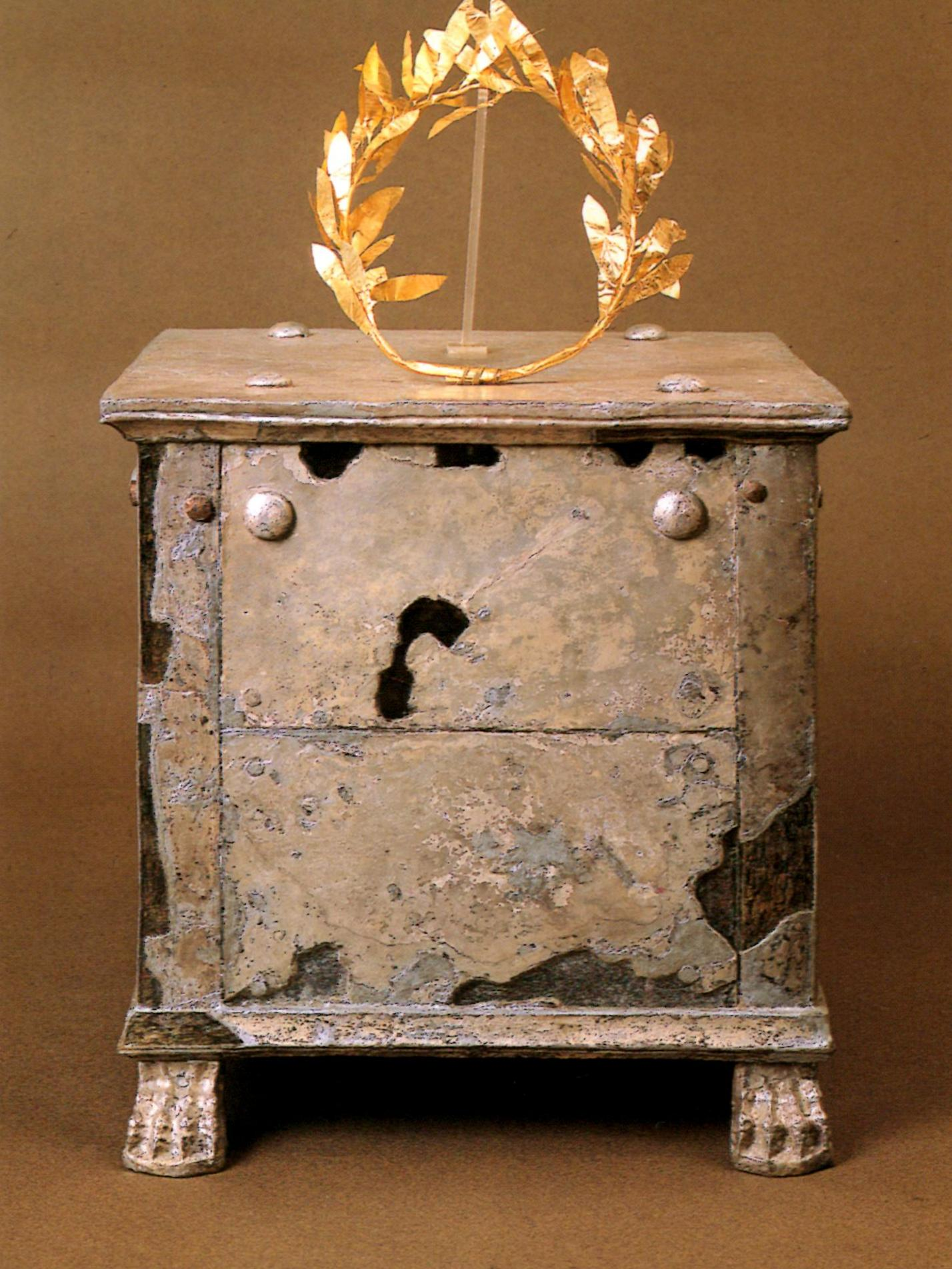
Silver ossuary and gold crown of Brasidas

- Prehistoric era
- Early historical period
- Classical and Hellenistic time
- The sanctuaries
- Public and private life
- tombs
- The early Christian period
- The Byzantine period
- Temporary exhibitions

=== Upper floor ===
- The history of Amphipolis
- The history of the colonization of the surroundings of Strymon river
- The history of neighboring places like Argilos, Eion and Brea
- The evolution of the Macedonian kingdom and some of its kings

== Important finds ==
- Figures from prehistoric times
- Gold jewelry from the Kasta tomb
- A clay bust of a female deity, found in a tomb from the Hellenistic period
- The stele into which the Ephebic law was carved
- A silver vessel and a golden branch of olive leaves
- A golden wreath (grave offering from the 4th century BC)
- A head of Aphrodite (Roman replica)
- Capital from the Basilica C of Amphipolis
- A gold coin of Justinian (Byzantine epoch 527 to 565 AD)
- Gold coin (stater) of Alexander the Great

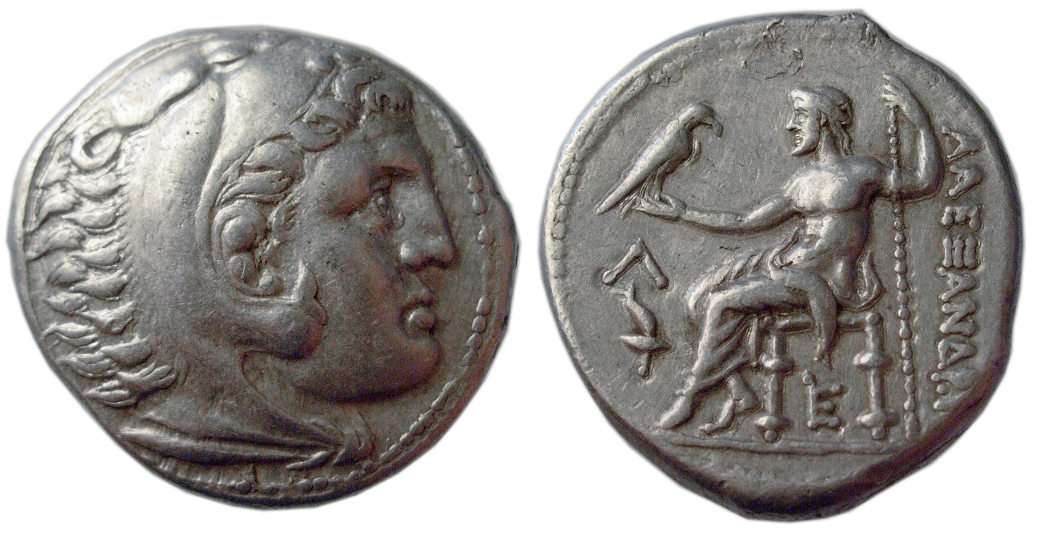
Alexander Tetradrachme Amphipolis

== The Macedonian coinage ==
Due to precious metal mines on the peninsula of Halkidiki and the Pangaion Mountains, enough raw materials were available for coinage. In the first half of the 5th century BC Alexander I introduced coinage in the Macedonian Kingdom. By extending his kingdom to the east, Alexander I brought more mines, located in the vicinity of Philippi, under his control. The yield from these mines alone was estimated at one TalentSilver (about 26 kg) per day. Depending on the sufficient availability of the raw material silver, the coins were either made of pure silver or of a silver alloy mixed with other metals. From the 5th century BC BC, two currencies existed in parallel. Heavier and more valuable coins for foreign trade and smaller, lower value, for payments within Macedonia. Towards the end of the 5th century, the smaller pieces of silver were gradually replaced by bronze coins. Philip II of Macedon continued to expand the Macedonian state, gaining control over more mines. In addition to the mint in Pella another was built in Amphipolis. From this time, gold coins were also made to the Attic standard (see Attic talent), which was introduced by Philip II.

== Gallery ==
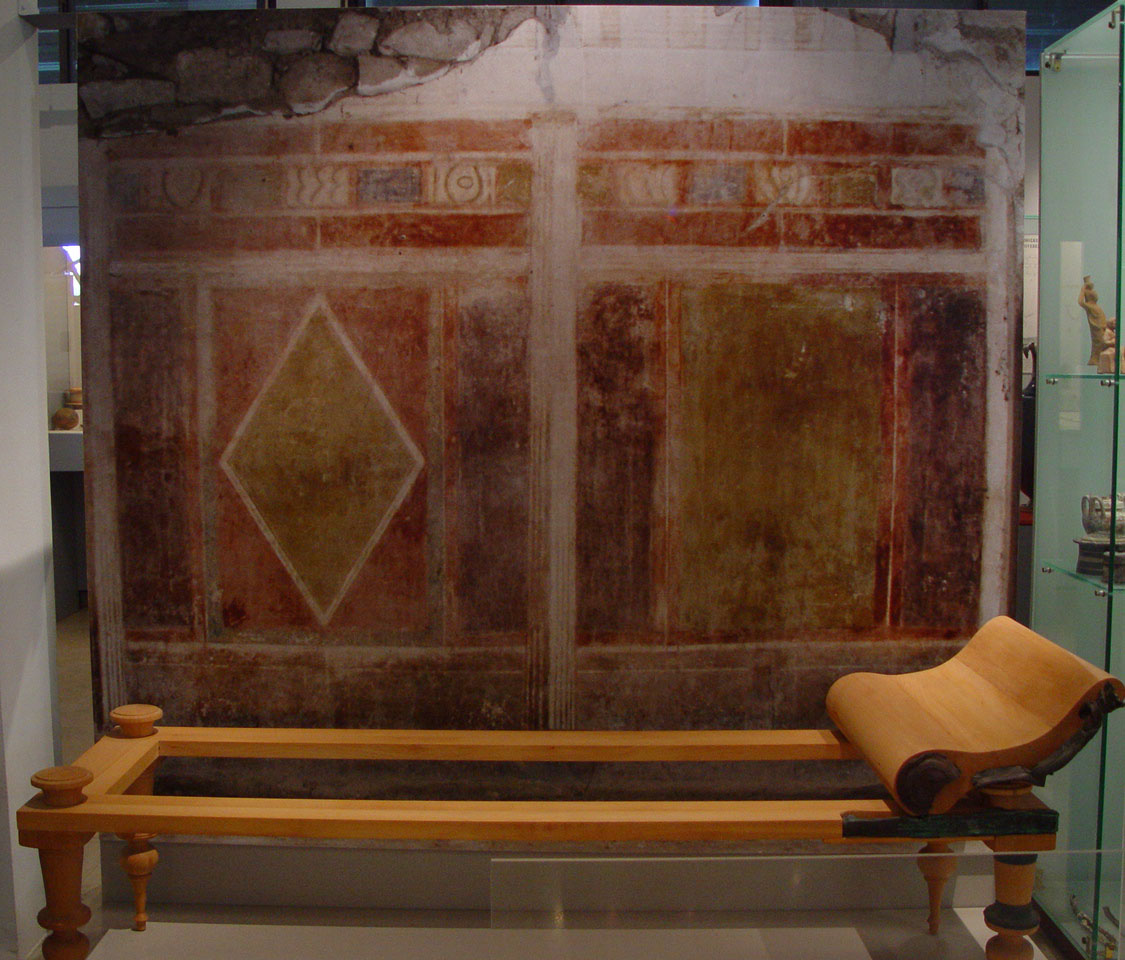
Frescoes on display

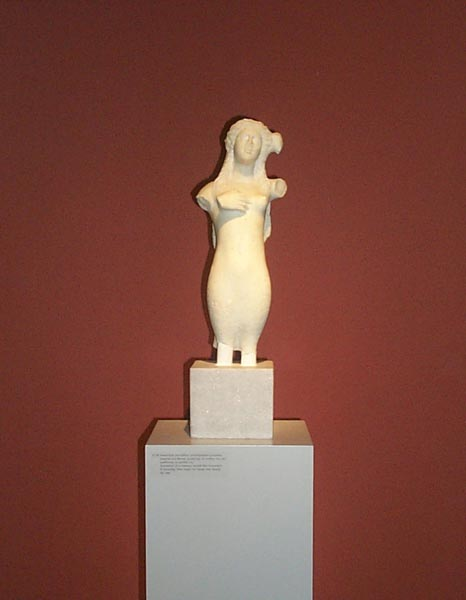
A sirens statue

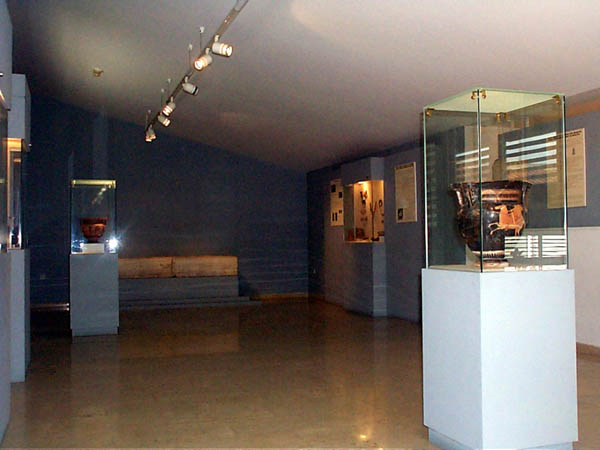
First floor exhibits

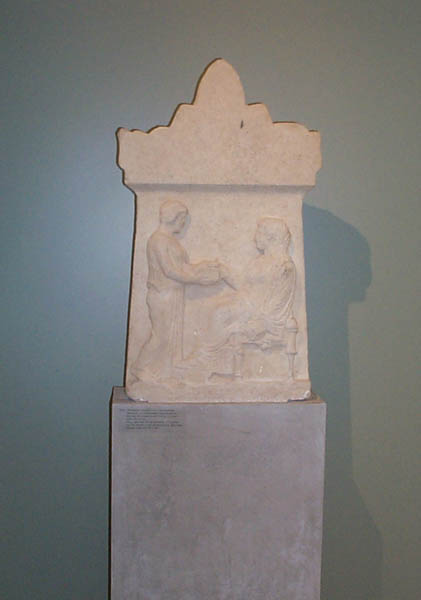
Inscribed grave stele
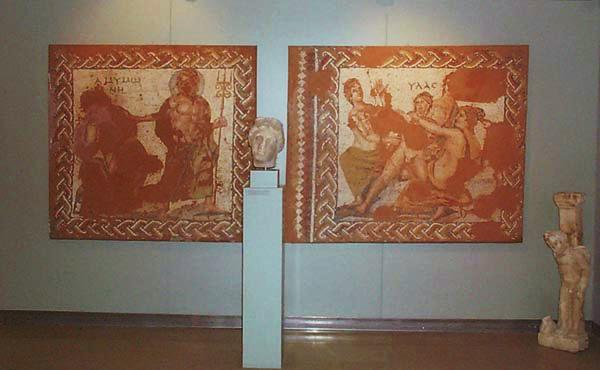
Mural paintings

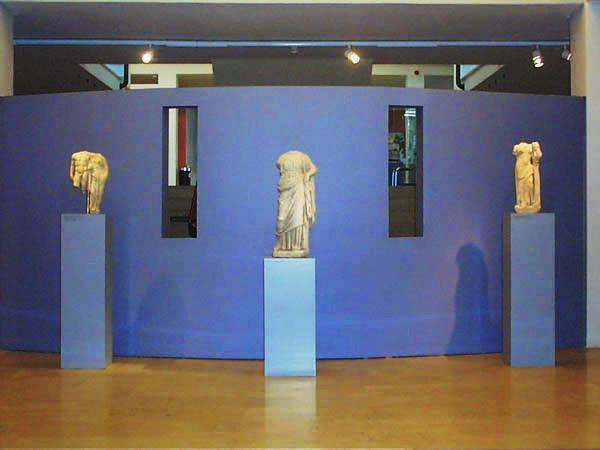
Statues of Orestes and Electra
