= Mesolakkia =

Mesolakkia Μεσολακκιά
- Community
- Location within Greece
- Coordinates: 40°49′52″N 23°55′57″E
- Country: Greece
- Administrative region: Central Macedonia
- Regional unit: Serres
- Municipality: Amphipolis
- Municipal unit: Amphipolis

Population (2021)
  - Community: 341
- Time zone: UTC+2 (EET)
  - Summer (DST): UTC+3 (EEST)
- Vehicle registration: ΕΡ

Mesolakkia (Greek: Μεσολακκιά) is a village and a community located in the Pangaion Hills, dating from the 10th century. It is located in the southern part of the mountains in the regional unit of Serres. The community consists of the villages Mesolakkia and Nea Mesolakkia.

== See also ==
- List of settlements in the Serres regional unit
