= Aetion =

3rd-century BC Greek artist

Aetion /eɪˈiːʃən/ (Ancient Greek: Ἀετίων) was an ancient Greek sculptor of Amphipolis, mentioned by Callimachus and Theocritus, from whom we learn that at the request of Nicias, a famous physician of Miletus, he executed a statue of Asclepius in cedar wood. He flourished about the middle of the 3rd century BC. There was an engraver of the same name; but when he lived is not known.

== Sources ==
- Antonio Corso. Aetion, Artist of the Age of Alexander. Actual Problems of Theory and History of Art: Collection of articles. Vol. 7. Ed. S. V. Mal’tseva, E. Iu. Staniukovich-Denisova, A. V. Zakharova. St. Petersburg, St. Petersburg Univ. Press, 2017, pp. 103–109. ISSN 2312-2129. https://dx.doi.org/10.18688/aa177-1-11
