= Panagia Eikosifoinissa Monastery =

- Μονή Παναγίας Εικοσιφοινίσσης
- Interactive map of Panagia Eikosifoinissa Monastery

Monastery information
- Established: 450
- Dedication: Presentation of the Theotokos
- Celebration: August 15; September 14; November 21, 22 & 23
- Diocese: Metropolis of Drama

Site
- Location: Amphipolis, Serres
- Country: Greece
- Coordinates: 40°57′58″N 24°6′20″E

The Panagia Eikosifoinissa Monastery (Greek: Μονή Παναγίας Εικοσιφοινίσσης) is a historical monastery located in the municipality of Amphipolis in the County of Serres, near the borders with the Counties of Kavala and Drama. Ecclesiastically, it belongs to the Holy Diocese of Drama. It is built at an altitude of 753 meters, on the northern side of Mount Pangaion.

== The Establishment ==
The establishment of the Monastery dates back to the years of Bishop Philippi Sozontos, who took part in the 4th Ecumenical Council of Chalcedon, Asia Minor (451 AD). According to tradition, Bishop Sozon founded, around 450 AD, a Temple and a monastic settlement at Vigla, near the Monastery. This monastic settlement was abandoned over the years and the Monastery was actually founded by Saint Germanos in the 8th century.

== The Monastery ==
Today the Monastery is female and has 23 nuns. It celebrates the memory of the first founder of Saint Germanos and the two Constantinople officials Nikolaos and Neophytos, on November 22 and the following day the memory of its second founder, Saint Dionysios, Patriarch of Constantinople. It also celebrates on August 15, in Dormition of Theotokos, on September 14, in memory of the Exaltation of the Holy Cross and on November 21, in memory of Presentation of the Theotokos. In front of the Monastery there is the monument of the 172 monks who were slaughtered by the Turks in 1507.

In 2011, after actions of the Metropolis of Drama, part of the holy Relic of Saint Dionysios (second founder of the Monastery) was returned from Bulgaria. The relic was stolen during the Bulgarian Occupation, along with many other relics that remain today in Sofia (at the Center for Slavo-Byzantine Studies Ivan Dujev and the National History Museum of Bulgaria). Also, in 2016, with the contribution of the Archdiocese of America, a rare manuscript New Testament of 674 pages, written in the 9th century, which had been stolen in 1917 by the Bulgarians and had ended up at the Lutheran School of Theology in Chicago in the U.S., was returned to the Monastery .P.A. It is the world's oldest complete manuscript of the New Testament.

== Sources ==
- Μητροπολίτου Δράμας Διονύσιου Κ. Κυράτσου «Ιστορία και Θαύματα Παναγίας Εικοσιφοινίσσης», έκδοση της Ιεράς Μονής Εικοσιφοινίσσης, Δράμα 2003
- Δρ. Θεοχάρη Μ. Προβατάκη «Η Μονή Εικοσιφοίνισσας η Αχειροποίητος του Παγγαίου Όρους», έκδοση της Ανώνυμης Τεχνικής Εταιρείας «Μηχανική», Αθήνα 1998
- Βασίλη Άτσαλου «Η ονομασία της Ιεράς Μονής της Παναγίας της Αχειροποίητου του Παγγαίου, της επονομαζομένης της Κοσινίτσης ή Εικοσιφοινίσσης», έκδοση του ιστορικού αρχείου του Δήμου Δράμας, Δράμα 1995
- orthodoxia.gr
- Νομαρχιακή Αυτοδιοίκηση Σερρών
- Ιερά Μητρόπολις Δράμας
- Ομιλία της Α.Θ.Π. του Οικουμενικού Πατριάρχη κ. Βαρθολομαίου, 1 Νοεμβρίου 2008
