= Zaeelii =

Ancient tribe known from coins

Zaeelii (written on the coin as ΖΑΙΕΛΕΩΝ) is the name of an ancient tribe in Northern Greece(Thraco-Macedonian regions in the Pangaean district) known only from silver coins bearing the name made in circa 500-480 B.C.

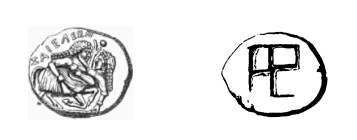
silver coin with zaielion depicted with centaurs
