= Rodolivos =

Rodolivos Ροδoλίβος
- Municipal unit
- Location within the regional unit

- Location within Greece
- Coordinates: 40°55′N 23°58′E
- Country: Greece
- Administrative region: Central Macedonia
- Regional unit: Serres
- Municipality: Amfipoli

Area
  - Municipal unit: 106.0 km^{2} (40.9 sq mi)

Population (2021)
  - Municipal unit: 2,002
  - Municipal unit density: 18.89/km^{2} (48.92/sq mi)
  - Community: 1,557
- Time zone: UTC+2 (EET)
  - Summer (DST): UTC+3 (EEST)
- Vehicle registration: ΕΡ

Rodolivos (Greek: Ροδoλίβος) is a town and a former municipality in the Serres regional unit, Greece. Since the 2011 local government reform it is part of the municipality Amfipoli, of which it is the seat and a municipal unit. The municipal unit has an area of 106.034 km^{2}. It is about 30 km from Drama. Its population was 2,002 in 2021. The village is at the foot of Mount Pangaio.

Just next to Rodolivos, namely on the hill of "St. Athanasius" and also in the neighboring place "Kouria", are attested traces of two ancient settlements of Edonis (Greek: Ηδωνίδα), which were located on the via Egnatia. In these sites were found some inscriptions of imperial times (2nd-3rd AD).

== Subdivisions ==
The municipal unit Rodolivos is subdivided into the following communities (population in 2021 in square brackets):

- Rodolivos [ 1,557 ]
- Domiros [ 111 ]
- Mikro Souli [ 334 ]

== See also ==
List of settlements in the Serres regional unit
