= Nea Kerdylia =

Village in Central Macedonia, Greece

Nea Kerdylia Νέα Κερδύλια
- Community
- Location within Greece
- Coordinates: 40°47′40″N 23°50′30″E
- Country: Greece
- Administrative region: Central Macedonia
- Regional unit: Serres
- Municipality: Amphipolis
- Municipal unit: Amphipolis

Population (2021)
  - Community: 510
- Time zone: UTC+2 (EET)
  - Summer (DST): UTC+3 (EEST)
- Vehicle registration: ΕΡ

Nea Kerdylia (Greek: Νέα Κερδύλια) is a village in the municipality of Amphipolis, in Central Macedonia, Greece. It is located on the national road Thessaloniki - Alexandroupolis and is 50 km away from Nigrita, 70 km from Serres. The village is named after Mount Kerdylion, which is part of the Kerdylion mountain range.

== See also ==
- List of settlements in the Serres regional unit
