= Kasta Tomb =

4th century BC tomb in Macedonia

- Τύμβος Καστά (Greek)
- Amphipolis Tomb (Τάφος της Αμφίπολης)
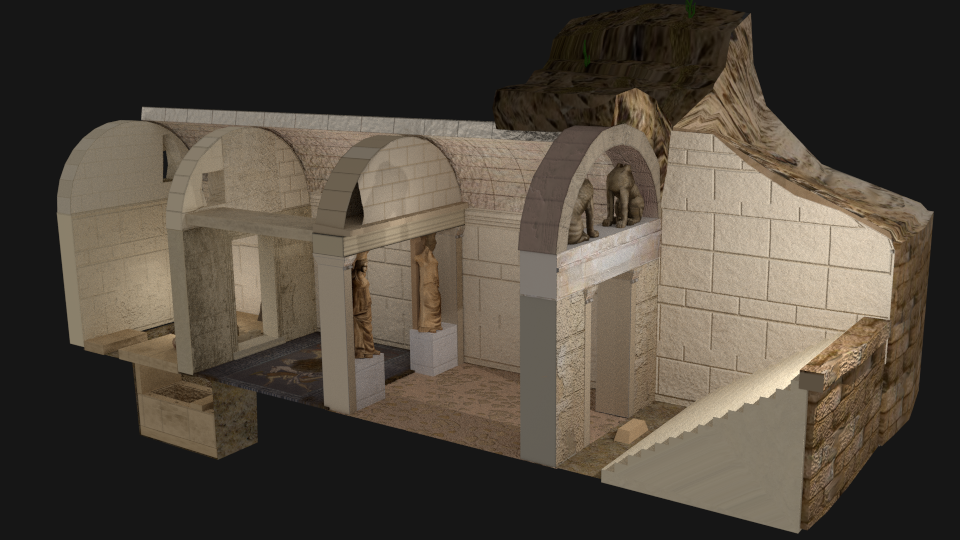
- 3D representation of the tomb structure

- Location within Greece
- 40°50′23″N 23°51′48″E
- Type: Macedonian tomb
- Periods: Hellenistic
- Associated with: Hephaestion
- Location: Amphipolis
- Region: Central Macedonia, Greece

History
- Built: Late 4th century BC

Site notes
- Excavation dates: 1964–present
- Archaeologists: Katerina Peristeri (Κατερίνα Περιστέρη)
- Public access: Not accessible, excavations still under way

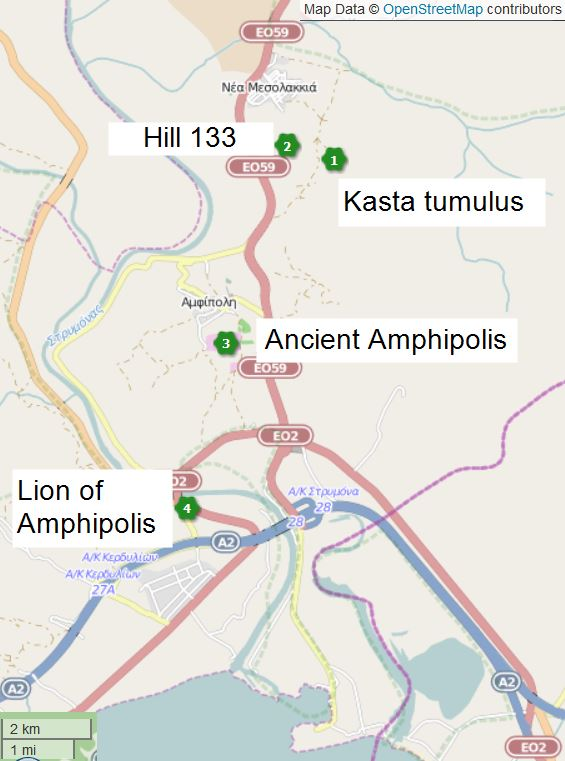
Kasta tumulus and Amphipolis location map

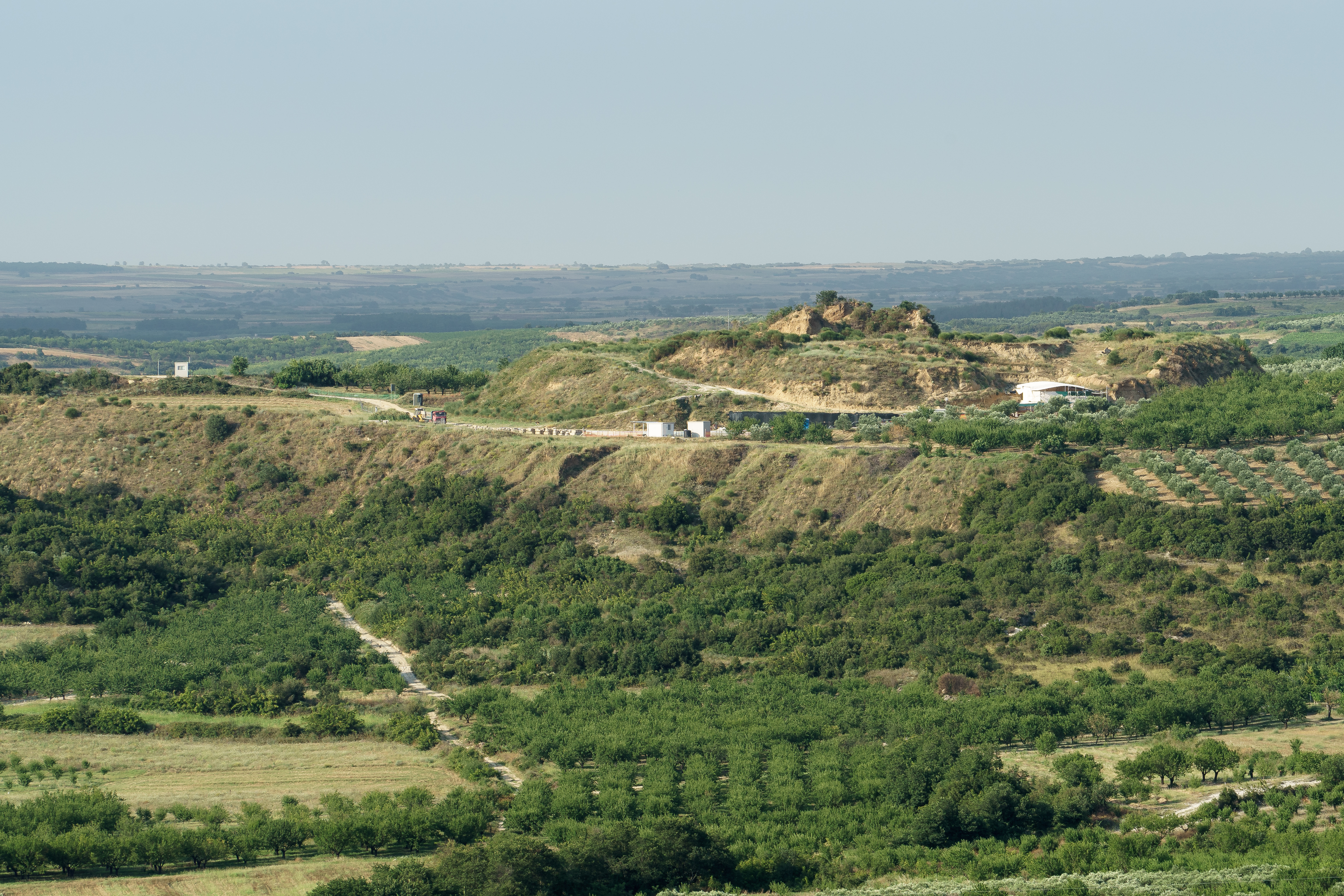
Kasta tumulus – view from Amphipolis

The Kasta Tomb (Greek: Τύμβος Καστά), also known as the Amphipolis Tomb (Greek: Τάφος της Αμφίπολης), is the largest ancient tumulus (burial mound) ever discovered in Greece, and by comparison dwarfs that of Philip II of Macedon, father of Alexander the Great, in Vergina.

It is an ancient Macedonian tomb of the last quarter of the 4th c. BC, and is enclosed in the Kasta mound near the ancient city of Amphipolis, Central Macedonia, in northern Greece. The first excavations at the mound in 1964 led to exposure of the perimeter wall, and further excavations in the 1970s uncovered many other ancient remains. The inner tomb was first discovered in 2012 and entered in August 2014.

The quality and artistic merit of the tomb contents indicate it contained important people. The remains of five people were found in the tomb.

== Occupants ==
Initial public speculation that, due to its size and cost of construction, it could have been built as the Macedonian tomb of Alexander the Great but was not used due to Ptolemy I Soter having seized the funeral cortege, as the available historical records mention Alexandria in Egypt as the final resting place of Alexander's body. However, this idea was dismissed by experts when commenting on the published findings. Nevertheless, due also to Alexander's associations with the city, it is thought likely to be the tomb of a close relation. Alexander prepared for campaigns here against Thrace in 335 BC and the port was used as naval base during his campaigns in Asia.

After Alexander's death, his wife Roxana and their young son Alexander IV were exiled by Cassander and later murdered here. Apart from the sheer size of the monument, some experts say it also bears the handprint of Dinocrates of Rhodes, the chief architect of Alexander the Great.

In 2014, the skeletal remains of five people were unearthed inside a corresponding tomb located in the lower levels of the third chamber. The bodies interred within are those of a woman aged older than 60, two men aged between 35 and 45, a newborn infant, and a fifth person consisting of only a few cremated bone fragments.

The excavation team argued that the tomb was a memorial dedicated to the dearest friend of Alexander the Great, Hephaestion, based on three inscriptions which apparently link the tomb to Hephaestion. The ancient Greek word ΠΑΡΕΛΑΒΟΝ (meaning 'received') is written in the inscriptions, and next to it the monogram of Hephaestion.

Others argue that Olympias, mother of Alexander, was buried here.

== Discovery ==
In the 1970s, a building of 10 m (33 ft) width was found on top of the centre of the mound, and is thought to have been a grave marker. This, together with other evidence, supported the likelihood of a large funerary complex within. The tumulus was also found to have covered earlier cemeteries with at least 70 graves from the nearby "Hill 133" settlement predating Amphipolis.

== Tumulus details ==
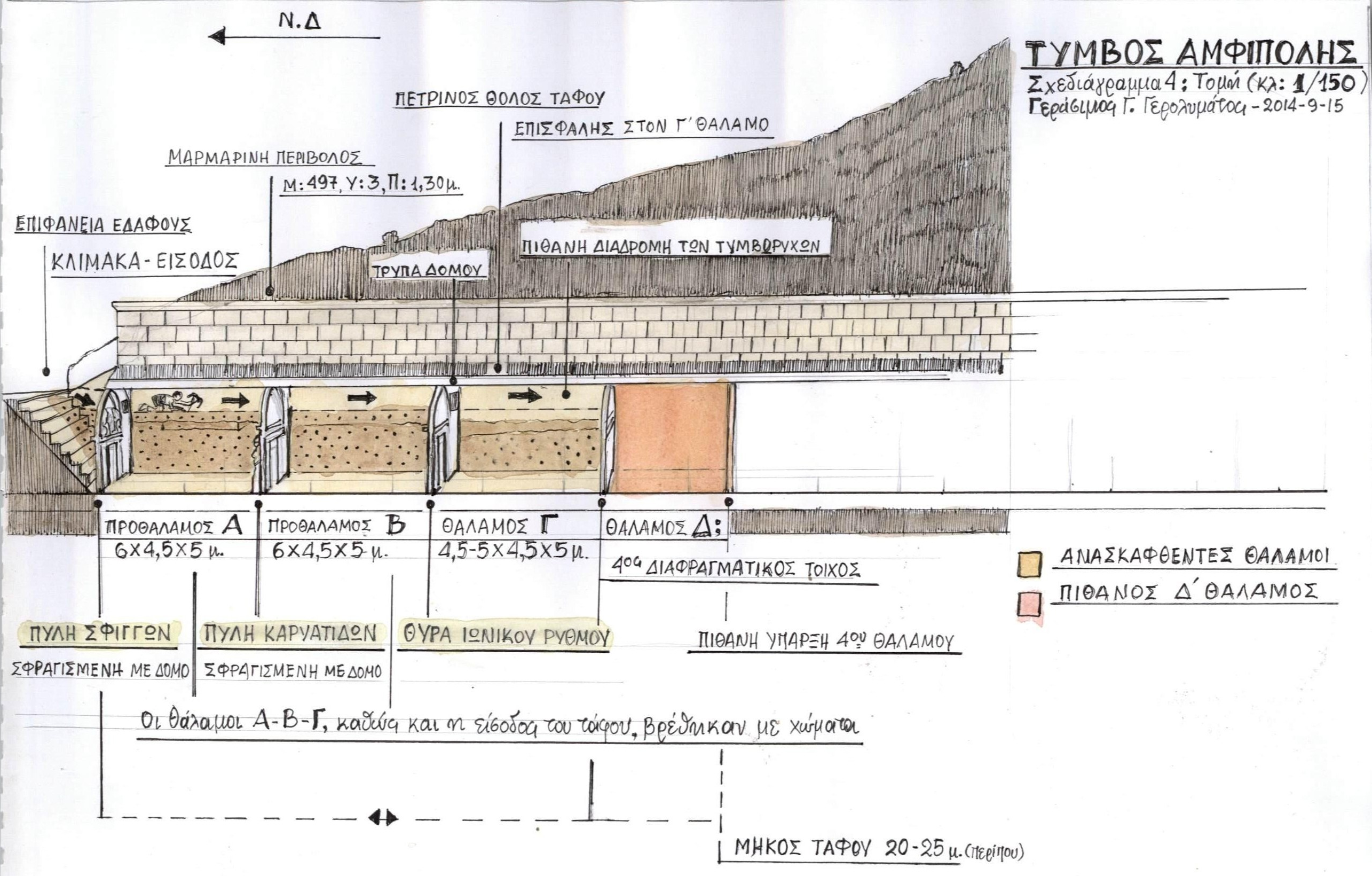
Structural model (2014)

The tomb complex is surrounded by an almost circular wall of 158 m (518 ft) of diameter and 3 m (10 ft) height made of limestone covered with marble from the island of Thassos, 60 km from Amphipolis. The state of preservation of the wall and the cornice covering the building is in part very good. The burial mound is about 30 m high and 250,000 m^{3} of sand were needed to fill it. Parts of the wall were removed during the Roman period and single ashlars were found in the base of the Lion of Amphipolis.

=== The tomb ===
The tomb consists of three chambers. The ceiling throughout is a barrel vault. Access is via a 13-step staircase, the masonry of the entrance area is plastered. Originally, the access to the tomb as well as the access from the first to the second chamber were sealed with massive blocks of stone. The tomb was largely filled with sand or earth.

=== First chamber ===
The staircase is separated from this chamber by a wall with a doorway. The space between the lintel and the vaulted ceiling is open. There are two sphinxes on the lintel guarding the main entrance to the tomb, parts of the heads and wings of which were found in the third chamber. The sphinxes were around 2 m tall. The passage to the first chamber is framed by two columns decorated with painted egg-and-dart motifs. The floor is paved with pieces of white marble embedded in red mortar.

A fresco below the sphinxes mimics an Ionian peristyle.

=== Second chamber ===
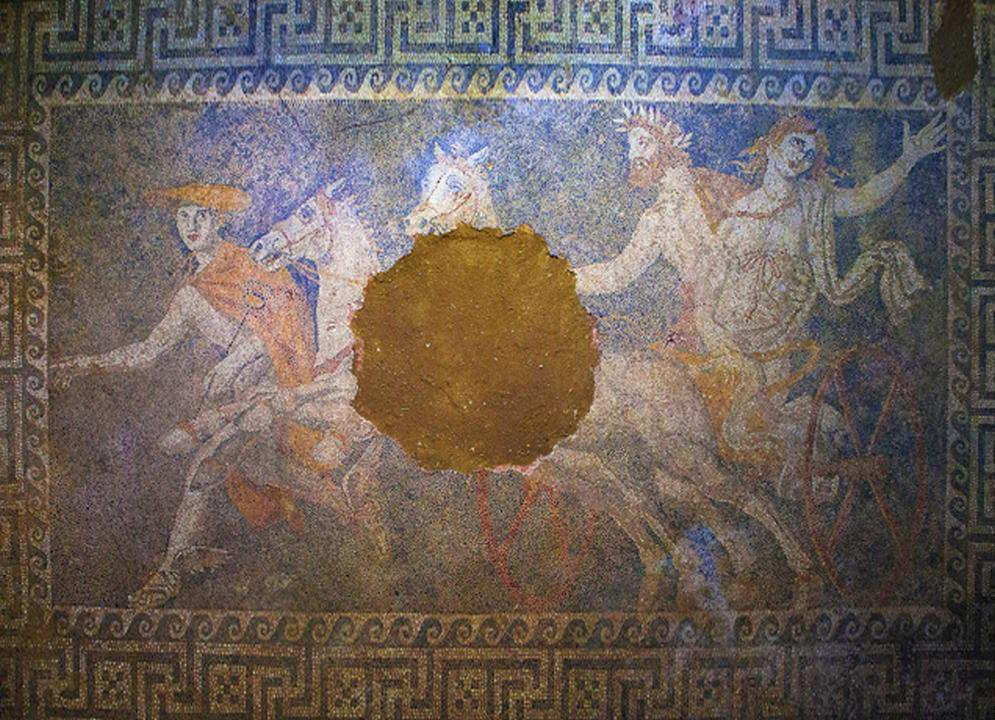
Mosaic: Rape of Persephone by Pluto

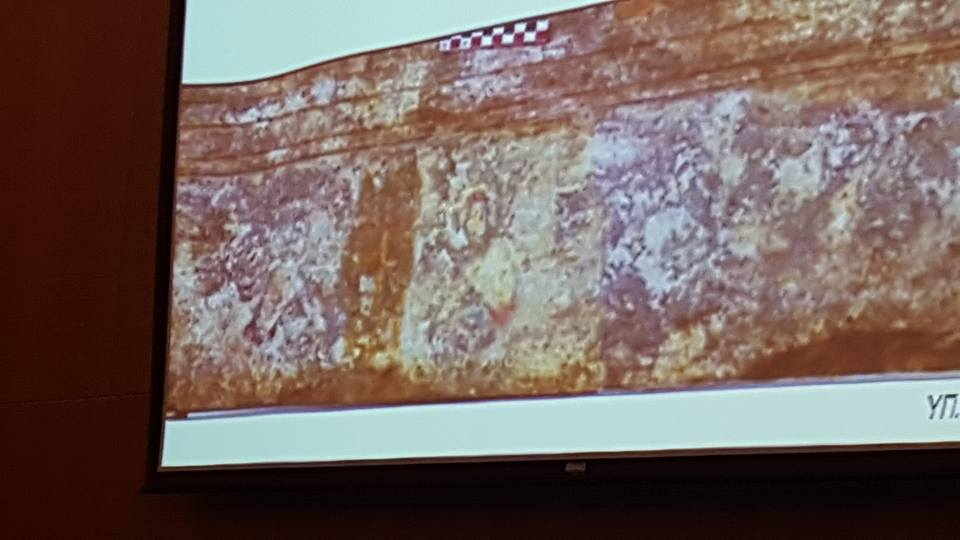
One of the 7 architraves, found in the 2nd Chamber

The chamber is 4.5 m wide, 3 m long and around 6.5 m high. It is slightly taller than the first chamber and is separated from it by a threshold. The lintel leading to the second antechamber is supported by two caryatids. They each stand on a 1.4 m high platform and are 2.27 m tall. The face of the caryatid west of the gate is well preserved, the face of the east is broken, parts of which were found in situ.

The entire floor is decorated with a mosaic of expert craftsmanship, though never intended to be seen. It uses black, white, grey, yellow, blue and red pebbles and is framed with a meandering geometric pattern and a wave pattern on the inside. In the middle of the mosaic the tesserae are missing on an almost circular surface with a diameter of approximately 80 cm. Some of the missing pebbles were found in the layer of earth covering the chamber. The picture depicts the abduction of Persephone by Hades. Both stand on a chariot drawn by two white horses and are guided by Hermes who accompanies the spirits of the deceased to Hades. Persephone wears a white robe with a narrow red ribbon around her waist. Hades is depicted with a crown and Hermes with winged sandals.

=== The burial chamber ===
The burial chamber is 4.5x4.5 m and is separated from the second chamber by a double marble door carved to imitate wooden doors with fittings and nails. Insets in the doors indicate that metal rings were originally attached to them. The external dimensions of the inner tomb are 3.23 x 1.56 m and about 1 m deep. The tomb is constructed of massive stone blocks. The box-shaped tomb is embedded in the floor which is paved with ashlars. According to a report by the Greek Ministry of Culture, nails from a wooden coffin and decorative elements made of bone and glass remained from the burial in the otherwise robbed grave.

The head of one of the two sphinxes and parts of the wings were found in the burial chamber with parts of the broken marble door.

Remains of five people were found here. The deceased were a 60-year-old woman, two men aged 35 to 45, an infant and another person who was cremated. The younger man showed signs of unhealed, possibly fatal wounds.

== Public access ==
The tomb opened in April 2023 for specific groups (tour operators, researchers, scientists). It is expected to open to the general public in early 2028.

== In popular culture ==
The board game Amphipolis, designed by Reiner Knizia, was published in 2015 and it is based on the location and findings of the Kasta Tomb.

== See also ==
- Vergina Tombs
