= Philip of Amphipolis =

Philip of Amphipolis (Greek: Φίλιππος ὁ Ἀμφιπολίτης) was a Greek writer of unknown date, remarkable for his obscenity, of which the Suda has given a sufficiently significant specimen. He wrote a history of Rhodes, which the Suda especially stigmatizes for the obscenity of its matter, a history of the Cos island and Thasiaca a history of Thasos. He wrote some other works not enumerated by the Suda. Theodorus Priscianus, an ancient medical writer, classes Philip of Amphipolis with Herodian and Iamblichus the Syrian, as a pleasant writer of amatory tales, whose works tended to allure the mind to the pursuit of pleasure. All his works appear to be lost.
