= Proti, Serres =

Village in Eastern Macedonia, Greece

Proti Πρώτη
- Municipal unit
- Location within the regional unit

- Location within Greece
- Coordinates: 40°57′N 24°00′E
- Country: Greece
- Administrative region: Central Macedonia
- Regional unit: Serres
- Municipality: Amfipoli

Area
  - Municipal unit: 79.2 km^{2} (30.6 sq mi)

Population (2021)
  - Municipal unit: 1,546
  - Municipal unit density: 19.5/km^{2} (50.6/sq mi)
  - Community: 907
- Time zone: UTC+2 (EET)
  - Summer (DST): UTC+3 (EEST)
- Vehicle registration: ΕΡ

Proti (Greek: Πρώτη, known as Φυλίς "Fylis" before 1927 and as Κιούπκιοϊ "Turkish: Küpköy" before 1919) is a village and a former municipality in the Serres regional unit, Greece. Since the 2011 local government reform it is part of the municipality Amphipoli, of which it is a municipal unit. The municipal unit has an area of 79.241 km^{2}. The population of the municipal unit was 1,546 at the 2021 census.

Near Proti has been found an archaeological site that is probably identified with the Roman station of via Egnatia Domeros. From here comes also various ancient inscriptions, among which a Latin inscription that mentions the inhabitants of two ancient settlements (i.e. "Montani" and "Suritani").

== Notable people ==
- Konstantinos Karamanlis (1907–1998) conservative politician, prime minister (1955–1963, 1974–1980) and president of Greece (1980–1985, 1990–1995)
- Kostas Karamanlis (1956–) conservative politician, prime minister (2004–2009) of Greece
- Christos Govetas, master Greek traditional musician, singer and recording artist, based in Seattle since the 1980s.
