= Amphipolis (municipality) =

Amfipoli Αμφίπολη
- Municipality
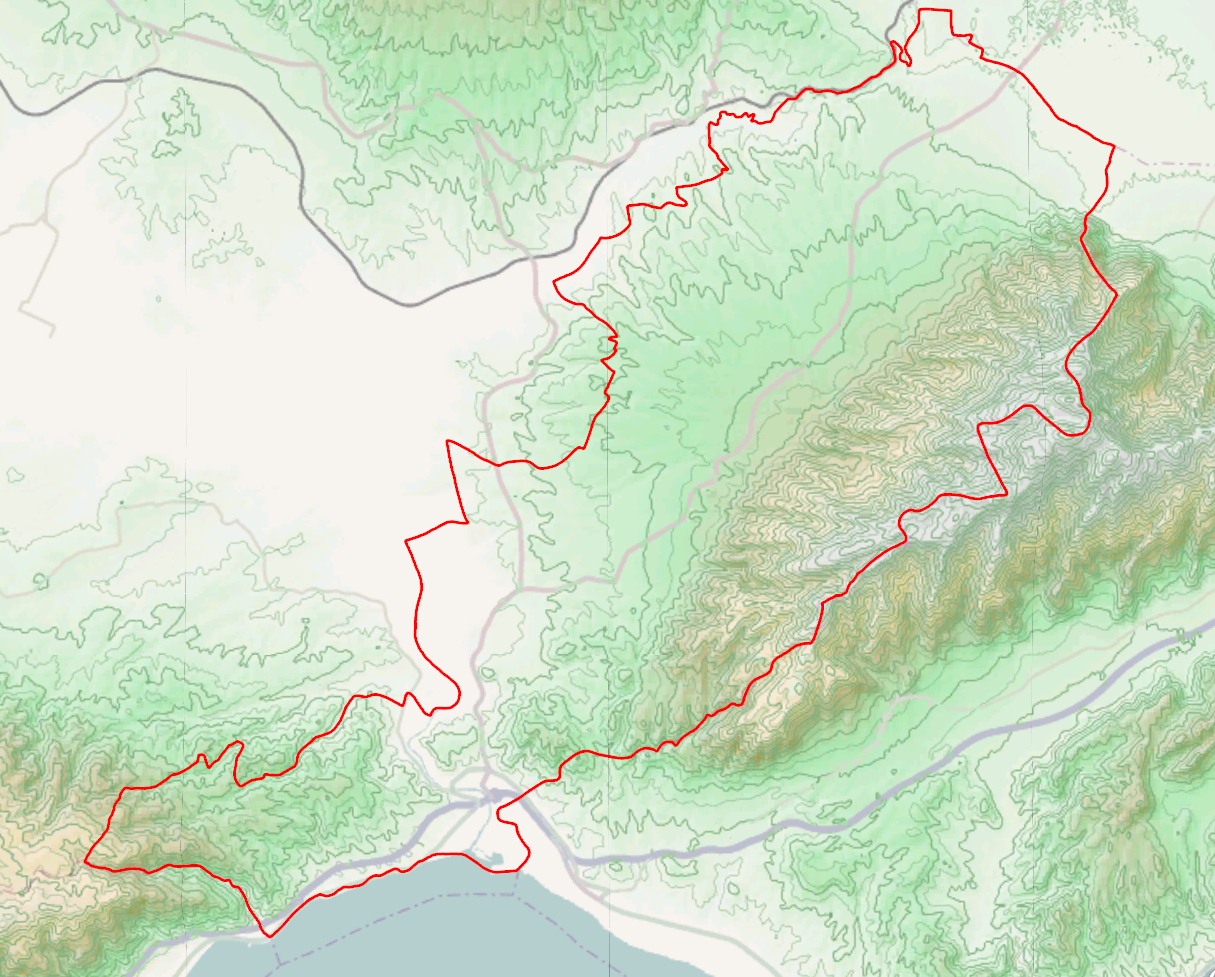
- Amfipolis municipality

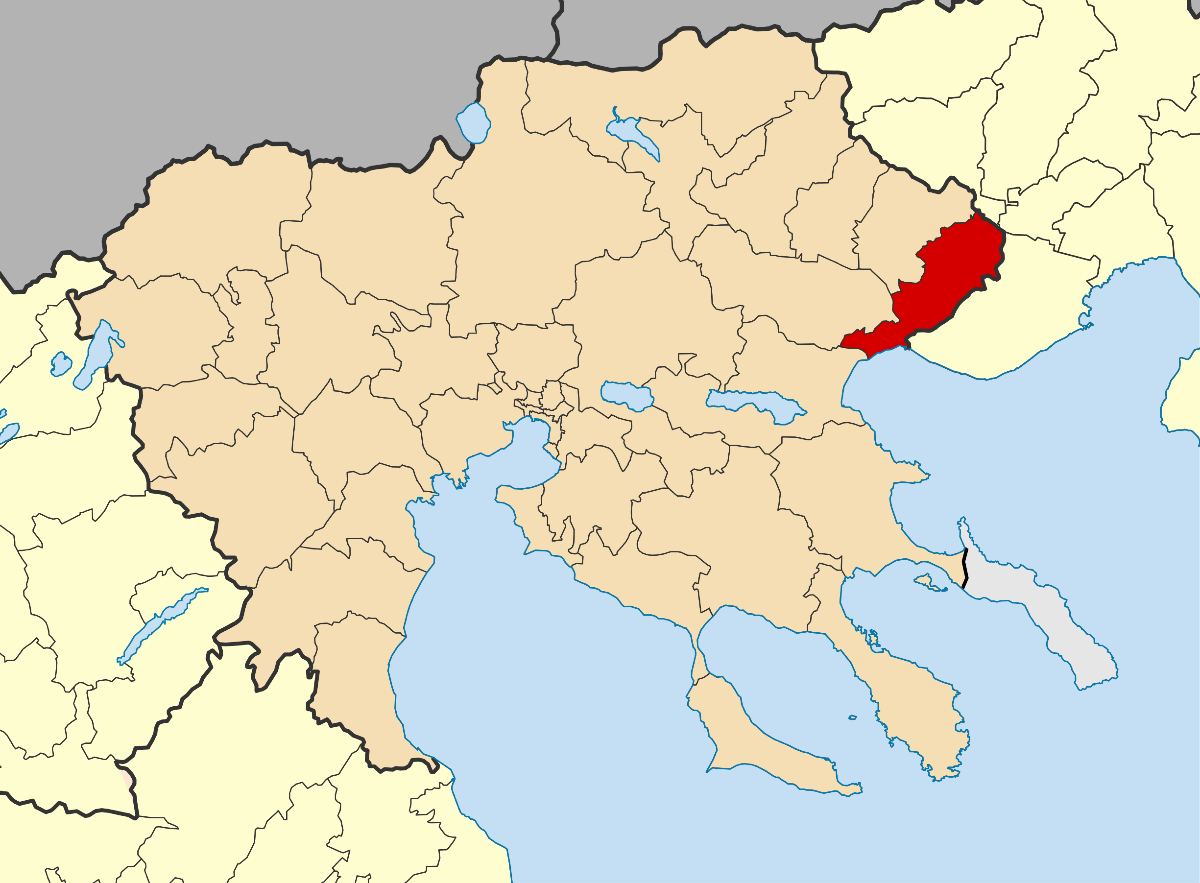

- Location within Greece
- Coordinates: 40°49′6″N 23°50′24″E
- Country: Greece
- Administrative region: Central Macedonia
- Regional unit: Serres
- Seat: Rodolivos

Government
  - Mayor: Stergios Frastanlis (since 2019)

Area
  - Municipality: 411.7 km^{2} (159.0 sq mi)
  - Municipal unit: 152.1 km^{2} (58.7 sq mi)

Population (2021)
  - Municipality: 7,186
  - Density: 17.45/km^{2} (45.21/sq mi)
  - Municipal unit: 2,170
  - Municipal unit density: 14.3/km^{2} (37.0/sq mi)
  - Community: 163
- Time zone: UTC+2 (EET)
  - Summer (DST): UTC+3 (EEST)
- Vehicle registration: ΕΡ
- Website: dimos-amfipolis.gr

Amphipolis (Greek: Αμφίπολη, Amfípoli) is a municipality in the Serres regional unit of Greece. The municipality is named after the ancient city of the same name. The seat of the municipality is Rodolivos.

== Municipality ==
The municipality Amfipoli was formed at the 2011 local government reform by the merger of the following 4 former municipalities, that became municipal units:

- Amfipoli
- Kormista
- Proti
- Rodolivos

The municipality has an area of 411.773 km^{2}, the municipal unit 152.088 km^{2}. The municipal unit Amfipoli consists of the communities Amfipoli, Mesolakkia, Nea Kerdylia and Palaiokomi.
