= Argilos =

Argilos Άργιλος
- Community
- Location within Greece
- Coordinates: 40°16′01″N 21°44′49″E
- Country: Greece
- Administrative region: Western Macedonia
- Regional unit: Kozani
- Municipality: Kozani
- Municipal unit: Kozani

Population (2021)
  - Community: 340
- Time zone: UTC+2 (EET)
  - Summer (DST): UTC+3 (EEST)

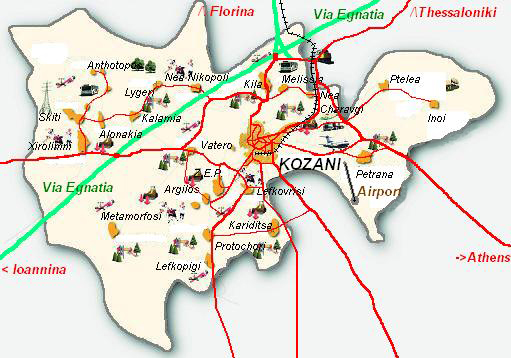
Location in Kozani

Argilos (Greek: Άργιλος) is a community of the city of Kozani in northern Greece. Located south-west of the city centre, it had a population of 340 at the 2021 census. During the Ottoman Empire it was called Geni-kioi. The modern name of the village comes from the argil soil with the red colour.
