= Pangaion Hills =

Mountain range in Greece

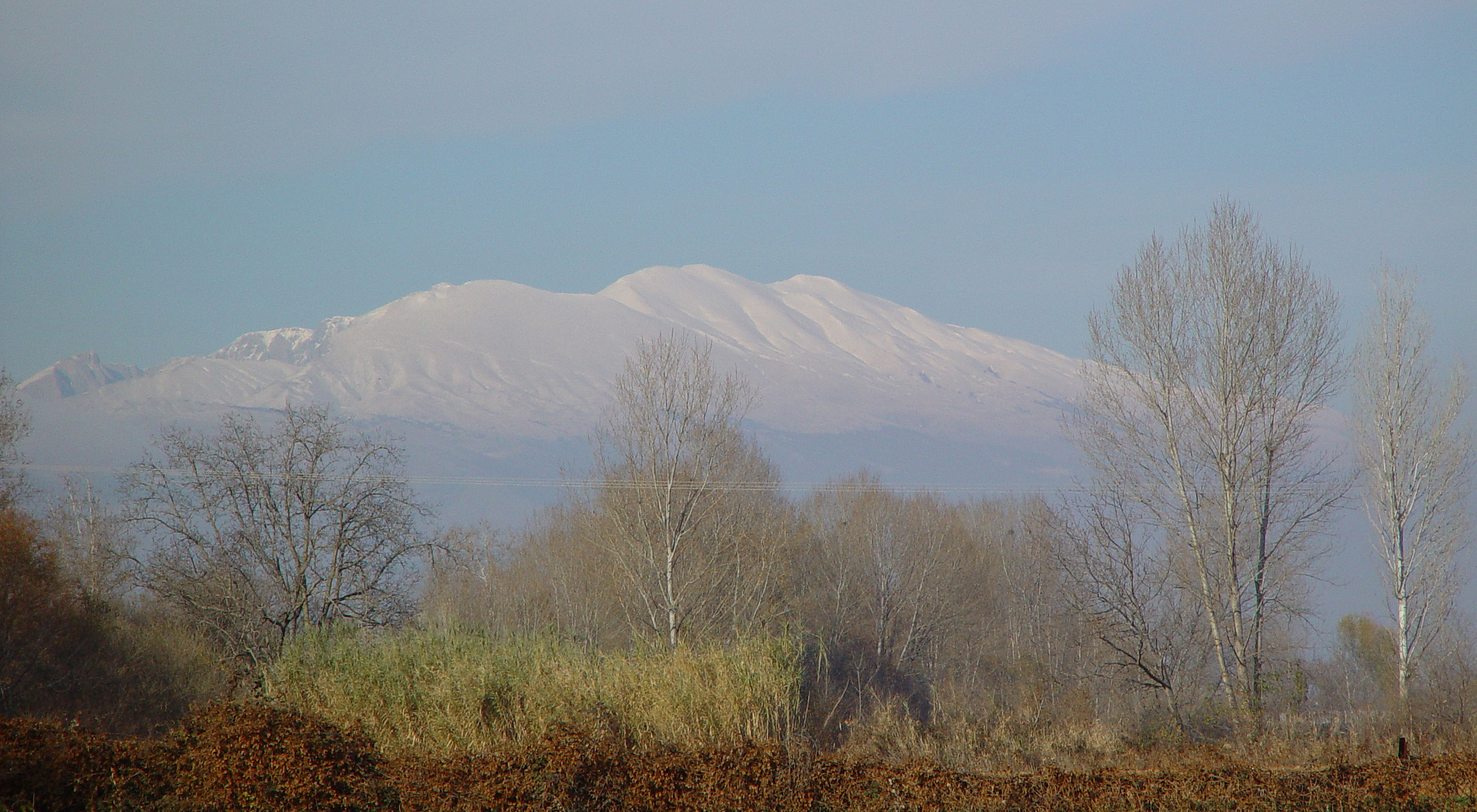
- Snow-covered Pangaion hills from the forests of Kavala

Highest point
- Peak: Koutra
- Elevation: 1,956 m (6,417 ft)
- Prominence: 1,773 m (5,817 ft)
- Listing: Ultra
- Coordinates: 40°55′01″N 24°04′58″E

Geography
- Country: Greece
- Regional unit: Kavala; Serres

The Pangaion Hills (Greek: Παγγαίο, romanized: Pangéo; Ancient Greek: Καρμάνιον, romanized: Karmánion; Homeric Greek: Nysa; also called Pangaeon or Pangaeum) are a mountain range in Greece, about 40 km west of Kavala. The highest elevation is 1,956 m at the peak of Koutra. The Aegean Sea lies to the south and the plains of Philippi–Kavala to the north. The mountain range covers the southeastern portion of the Serres regional unit as well as the northwestern part of the Kavala regional unit, which includes the larger part of the hills.

The Ottoman Turks called the hills Pınar Dağ ("Spring Mount"). The Slavic name is Kushnitsa (Кушница) or Kushinitsa (Кушиница).

== Description ==
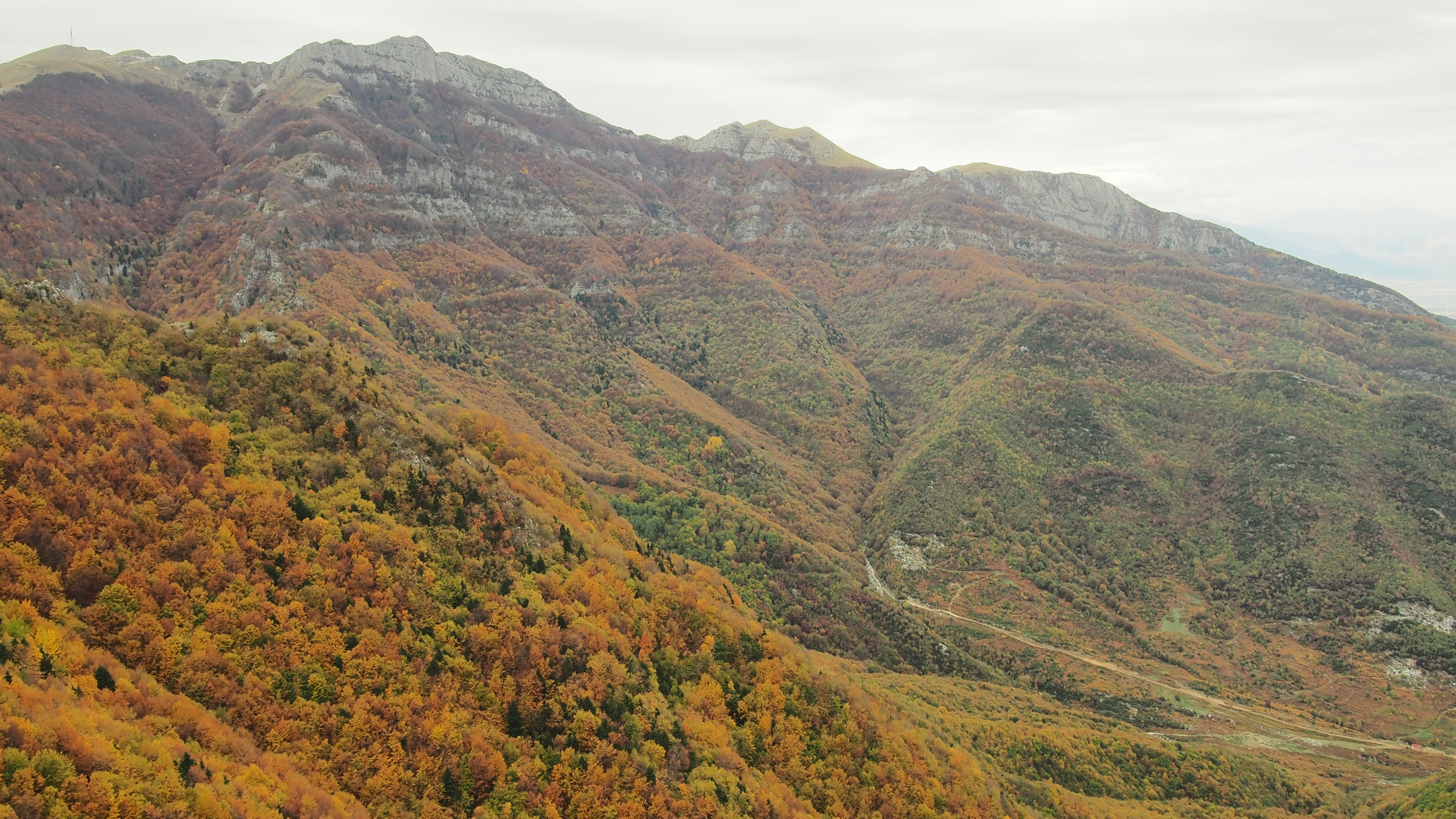
View of Pangaion at c. 1500 m

The hills are located across a fertile plain from the ancient city of Philippi, known for the Battle of Philippi, a Roman-era civil war battle that took place in 42 BC. They are located in the ancient country of Sintice, between the Strymon and the Xiropotamos rivers, and are covered with oriental plane and chestnut trees.

Towns in the Pangaion hills include Nikisiani and Palaiochori, which are mainly agricultural and produce crops such as grain and tobacco. The town of Palaiochori contains the ruins of an ancient castle on a peak overlooking the town.

Gold and silver were mined in the area in ancient times. The Athenian tyrant Pisistratus was exiled in the mountains. The rich gold and silver deposits in the region encouraged the Athenians to establish a colony in 465 BC at a site known as the Nine Roads (Ennéa Hodoí). The colonists were massacred by nearby Thracians and the colony was abandoned, though the Athenians later returned to the area with their colony at Amphipolis.

Pangaion is frequently mentioned by ancient Greek and Latin sources. It was famous for its gold and silver mines, as well as for shipbuilding timber and the oracle of Dionysus.

According to Pseudo-Plutarch, the mountain range was named after Pangaeus, son of Ares and Critobule, who killed himself after accidentally sleeping with his own daughter.

The municipality of Pangaio is named after this mountain range and the seat of the municipality is Eleftheroupoli.

== See also ==
- Zaeelii: Tribe attested from coins that are from the Pangaion hills.
- Panagia Eikosifoinissa Monastery
