= Persaeus =

Greek Stoic philosopher (307/6–243 BCE)

Persaeus (Greek: Περσαῖος; 307/6–243 BC) of Citium, son of Demetrius, was a Greek Stoic philosopher, and a friend and favourite student of Zeno of Citium.

== Life ==
He lived in the same house as Zeno. Later writers wrote that Persaeus had been Zeno's slave, who had perhaps originally been an amanuensis sent to Zeno by King Antigonus II Gonatas; however, the source of this story seems to be due to a sarcastic remark made about Persaeus by Bion of Borysthenes who, upon seeing a statue of Persaeus inscribed: "Persaeus the pupil of Zeno", sneered that it ought to have been: "Persaeus the Servant of Zeno".

It is known that Antigonus II Gonatas invited Zeno to his court at Pella around 276 BC. Zeno refused because of his old age and sent his students Persaeus and Philonides of Thebes instead. While Persaeus was at Antigonus' court, Antigonus once, wishing to make trial of him, caused some false news to be brought to him that his estate had been ravaged by the enemy, and as his countenance fell, "Do you see," said he, "that wealth is not a matter of indifference?"

Persaeus subsequently became an important figure at the Macedonian court. After Antigonus captured Corinth around 244 BC, he put Persaeus in control of the city as Archon. Persaeus died in 243 BC defending the city against the attack led by Aratus of Sicyon.

== Writings ==
None of the writings of Persaeus survive except a few fragments. Diogenes Laërtius lists the following works as being written by Persaeus:

- Ἠθικαῖς σχολαῖς – Ethical School.
- Περὶ βασιλείας – On Kingship.
- Πολιτεία Λακωνική – Constitution of the Lacedaemonians.
- Περὶ γάμου – On Marriage.
- Περὶ ἀσεβείας – On Impiety.
- Θυέστης – Thyestes.
- Περὶ ἐρώτων – On Love.
- Προτρεπτικοί – Exhortations.
- Διατριβῶν – Conversations.
- Χρειῶν – Apophthegms.
- Ἀπομνημονεύματα – Reminiscences.
- Πρὸς τοὺς Πλάτωνος νόμους – Plato's Laws.

Concerning Persaeus's philosophical views, Cicero mentions that:

Persaeus says that it was men who had discovered some great aid to civilisation that were regarded as gods, and that the names of divinities were also bestowed upon actual material objects of use and profit, so that he is not even content to describe these as the creations of God, but makes out that they are themselves divine.
