= Anagnostaras =

Greek military general (1760–1825)

Anagnostis Papageorgiou Αναγνώστης Παπαγεωργίου
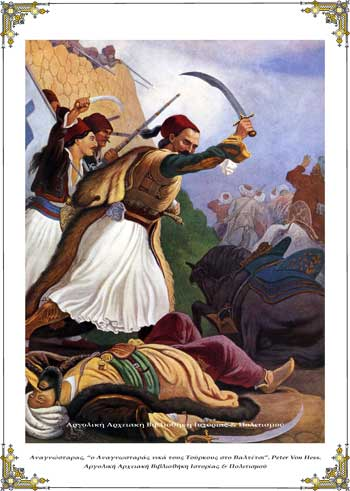
- Anagnostaras in the Battle of Valtetsi by Peter von Hess.

War Minister of the provisional Greek Government
- In office 1822–1825

Personal details
- Born: Christos Papageorgiou (Χρήστος Παπαγεωργίου); 1760 Poliani, Ottoman Empire
- Died: 8 May 1825 (aged 64–65) Sphacteria, First Hellenic Republic
- Cause of death: Killed in action
- Occupation: Soldier; Revolutionary
- Nickname: Anagnostaras (Αναγνωσταράς)

Military service
- Allegiance: (Russia) Russian Empire (Greece) First Hellenic Republic
- Branch/service: Imperial Russian Army; Filiki Etaireia; Greek Revolutionary Army
- Rank: Major (Russian Army); General (Greek Revolutionary Army)
- Battles/wars: Russo-Turkish War (1787–1792); Russo-Turkish War (1806–1812); Greek War of Independence; Liberation of Kalamata; Battle of Valtetsi; Siege of Tripolitsa; Siege of Acrocorinth; Battle of Sphacteria (1825) †

Anagnostaras (Greek: Αναγνωσταράς; 1760 – 8 May 1825) was a Greek revolutionary, a leading member of the Filiki Etaireia, and later a general and War Minister of the Greek War of Independence. Anagnostaras is a nom de guerre, he was born as Christos Papageorgiou (Greek: Χρήστος Παπαγεωργίου) and signed as Anagnostis Papageorgiou (Greek: Αναγνώστης Παπαγεωργίου).

== Early years ==
Anagnostaras was born in 1760 at the village of Poliani (now part of the municipality of Kalamata in Messenia, Greece); his family originated from the Leontari area of Arcadia. In Russo-Turkish War (1787–1792), he appeared in the Ionian Islands, together with Christoforos Perraivos and Tzanetos Grigorakis, to serve with the rank of major under the commands of the Greek-Russian general Emmanouil Papadopoulos. In 1803 he moved to the island Zakynthos and starting his military service in the Imperial Russian Army until 1813, when he demobilized and moved to Odesa to ask his arrears of salary.

== Activity for the Filiki Etaireia ==
At Odesa in 1817, he was initiated into the Filiki Etaireia by Nikolaos Skoufas, became a "priest" and in March 1817 he was sent to Moscow to meet Athanasios Tsakalov, who sent him to the islands of Hydra and Spetses to search for "neophyte" members. Later in the same year went to Constantinople, where he found Papaflessas and initiated him on 21 June 1818, then returned to Zakynthos and initiated Theodoros Kolokotronis on 1 December 1818.

Later he was sent to the Peloponnese to continue his activity, in which paradoxically he used a bouzouki to sing poems of Rigas Feraios and songs of Klephts. The result of his tour was to be elected to the higher grade of "Apostle". Emmanuil Xanthos gave to Anagnostaras the code number 108 for correspondence with the other members of society. He was the first initiated Apostle of the Etaireia, after him were initiated Christoforos Perraivos, Yiannis Pharmakis and Elias Chrysospathis.

== Service in the Greek War of Independence ==
When the Greek War of Independence began in March 1821, Anagnostaras was present at the Liberation of Kalamata on 23 March 1821, when Greek irregular revolutionary forces took control of the city after the surrender of the Ottoman garrison, without fighting, as a Major under the command of Petrobey Mavromichalis. On 30 September 1821, along with Theodoros Kolokotronis, Kyriakoulis Mavromichalis and Panagiotis Giatrakos, he signed an agreement to confirm the position of the Peloponnesian Senate's members, and they came to rupture with Alexandros Ypsilantis, who eventually retreated. Anagnostaras was promoted to General and became member of the War Commission.

In March 1822, Anagnostaras along with Panagiotis Kefalas and Giatrakos' family supported Georgios Kountouriotis to form a new government at Myloi. In May 1822, after the reshuffles of Second National Assembly at Astros, he became War Minister of the provisional Greek Government.

He fought in the Battle of Valtetsi (12 May 1821), the Siege of Tripolitsa (September 1821), the Siege of Corinth (December 1821 – January 1822) and many other battles until 8 May 1825 when he was killed in the Battle of Sphacteria.

== Sources ==
- Kolokotrones, the Klepht and the Warrior, Sixty Years of Peril and Daring. An autobiography. London: T. Fisher Unwin. 1892. pp. 135–205.
- Chrysanthopoulos, Photios (1888). Vioi peloponnēsiōn andrōn kai tōn exōthen eis tēn Peloponnēson elthontōn (in Greek). Harvard University: P. D. Sakellariou. pp. 90–92.
- Filimon, Ioannis (1834). Dokimion peri tis Filikis Etairias (in Greek). Nauplio: Kondaxis-Loulakis. p. 185.
- Flessas, Konstantinos (1842). History of the Sacred Struggle (PDF) (in Greek). Athens: P.A. Komnenos. pp. 34–44, 144–145. Archived from the original (PDF) on 5 March 2016.
- "Anagnostaras". Μεγάλη Στρατιωτική και Ναυτική Εγκυκλοπαιδεία. Τόμος Β′: Αλαρκόν – Γωνιόμετρον (in Greek). Athens: Έκδοσις Μεγάλης Στρατιωτικής και Ναυτικής Εγκυκλοπαιδείας. 1929. p. 130.
- The History of the Greek People: The Greek Revolution (1821–1832) (in Greek). Vol. 12. Athens: Ekdotike Athenon. 1971. pp. 373–380. ISBN 960-213-097-0. OCLC 636806977. OL 18546042M.
