= Nikolaos Galatis =

Greek revolutionary (c. 1792 – 1819)

- Νικόλαος Γαλάτης
- Born: 1792 or 1794; Ithaca, Greece
- Died: 1819; Ermioni, Argolis
- Cause of death: Assassinated
- Monuments: Plaque and memorial at town square of Anogi, Ithaca
- Known for: Member of the Filiki Etairia
- Title: Count (self titled)
- Movement: Prelude to Greek war of independence
- Relatives: Ioannis Kapodistrias (cousin)
- Family: Galatis

Nikolaos Galatis (Greek: Νικόλαος Γαλάτης; c. 1792 – 1819) was a Greek pre-revolutionary figure from Ithaca and one of the founding members of the Filiki Etairia, the secret revolutionary society. He was initiated into the society by Nikolaos Skoufas in Odessa, and in turn he initiated many others into the revolutionary society, some of whom became important figures in the events of 1821. Despite his efforts in promoting the society in its early years, he was accused of various misdemeanours and follies, and was eventually assassinated by other members of the society just a few years after joining.

== Background and early life ==
Nikolaos Galatis was born in either Anogi or Kioni in Ithaca, Greece, to a noble family of the Ionian Islands who had first received noble privileges in the late 14th and early 15th centuries under the Tocco family. He is described by one report as 'a young Ithacan, handsome, from a noble family'.

The only information known about the direct family of Nikolaos comes from the archival records of his being questioned by Russian authorities in 1817. He had a brother, Eustathios, an archimandrite, who attempted to seek revenge for his brother after he was assassinated in 1819. He styled himself as a 'Count'. According to his own account, his father was a diplomat:

I was born on the island of Ithaca. My parents, who are still alive, still live there today. My father holds property there and is a diplomat by profession.

He was educated and cultivated, sufficiently so to join the Philomuse Society at Athens. He claimed to have been educated at the prestigious school at Kydonies (today Ayvalik, Turkey), and spoke Italian and French with sufficient fluency that he would use both of these languages professionally. He spoke French with Capodistria when the two met in Russia. After studying for an uncertain amount of time at Kydonies, he served as a scrivano (secretary) for Ali Pasha at Janina, for approximately 18 months. He was arrested by officials in British-ruled Corfu in February 1816, for reasons which remain unclear, and upon being asked why he believed he was being questioned, he responded: 'I do not know, I cannot think of anything other than because I worked in the service of Ali Pasha'.

== Revolutionary activities ==
Toward the end of 1816, Nikolaos Galatis set off for Odessa (now Ukraine), where he met with members of the Greek community who were involved in the young revolutionary movement. In Odessa, he met members of the secret Filiki Eteria including Nikolaos Skoufas, Emmanouil Xanthos and Athanasios Tsakalov. He was soon initiated into the secret society by Skoufas, one of its founding members. He was either the third or fifth member of the society in sequence of initiation. After joining, in 1817, Galatis headed for Russia with the aim of seeking support for the Greek revolutionary cause. Galatis wrote to Ioannis Capodistria, Foreign Minister of the Russian Empire under Tsar Alexander I, whom he asked to allow him to come to St Petersburg in order 'to make an announcement of great significance'. The Tsar consented:

Write to tell him to come. It would be a good thing for us to see what kind of person he is from up close.

In St Petersburg, Galatis, who claimed to be a cousin of Capodistria's, asked him to take up the leadership of the secret society, which Capodistria resolutely refused. Capodistria as Foreign Minister was seeking to uphold Russia's peaceful engagement with its European neighbours (including with the Ottoman Empire), and the call to take part in the Greek revolutionary movement was untenable since it would threaten Russia's foreign policy. In St Petersburg, Galatis styled himself as a count and wore the uniform of the National Guard of the Ionian Islands. This led Capodistria to see him as 'nothing more than an adventurer', or as Capodistria later recalled his response to Galatis:

Sir, if anyone were to consider this plan, he would have to be insane; and in order to speak to me about it in this place, where I have the honour to serve a great and sovereign Monarch, he would have to be, as you are, a young man who has just abandoned the rocks of Ithaca and is being led astray by some blind passion. ... you must tell your command that, if they do not wish to be destroyed and to lead their innocent and unfortunate nation to ruin, they must give up their revolutionary activities, and to live as they did before, under whichever government happens to exist, until such a time that Divine Providence decides otherwise.
