= Athanasios Sekeris =

Greek merchant

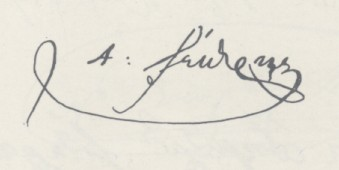
Signature of Athanasios Sekeris

Athanasios Sekeris was a Greek merchant and a prominent member of Filiki Eteria. He was the brother of Panagiotis and Georgios Sekeris.

== Early life ==
Athanasios studied in Dimitsana’s School. He then followed his older brother to Istanbul, where he completed his studies and started working as a merchant. In 1816, he settled in Odessa as co-partner of his brother.

== Career ==
In 1817, Nikolaos Skoufas introduced Anathos and Panagiotis Anagnostopoulos to the Filiki Eteria. The last one was hosted by Athanasios Sekeris in his house in Odessa. During that time, the headquarters’ transfer to Istanbul was decided. Before Skoufas’ departing to Istanbul, he revealed to Athanasios the Supreme Leader and appointed him as co-leader with Odessa as the headquarters and responsible for Bessarabia. When Skoufas departed Odessa, he took Anagnostopoulos and a reference letter for his brother, Panagiotis Sekeris. A few weeks later, he met Panagiotis and introduced him to the Filiki Eteria. This introduction was crucial because, through Panagiotis, the Filiki Eteria jointed Istanbul’s merchants. They gave financial assistance to Athanasios, while their influence and skills facilitated its expansion.

Athanasios decided to return home when the Greek War of Independence began. He left Odessa in late August 1821. He served as the head of a military unit in Tripolitsa in several battles. In one battle he was wounded in his right hand. After the death of his brother Georgios, he tried to receive appointment to some public post and to be compensated for his family's sacrifices to the Revolution. In 1823, he was appointed plenipotentiary of Tripolitsa province in the Second National Assembly at Astros, and in 1824 he was appointed as prefect of Old Patras. From 1828 to 1831 he was member of the provincial council of elders of Nafplio. From 1835 until 1843, he was president of a court of first instance. In 1844, Sekeriswas dismissed from his post as magistrate and he became superintendent and warehouse worker at Public Revenue of Argos’ municipality. The year of Athanasios' death is unknown.

== Bibliography ==
- Fotios Chrysanthopoulos,Βίοι Πελοποννησίων ανδρών και των εξώθεν εις την Πελοπόννησον ελθόντων κληρικών, στρατιωτικών και πολιτικών των αγωνισαμένων τον αγώνα της επαναστάσεως, Athens, 1888, Σταύρος Ανδρόπουλος, Τυπογραφείο Π. Δ. Σακελλαρίου.
- Kostas N. Triantafyllou, Ιστορικό Λεξικό των Πατρών, εκ του τυπογραφείου Πέτρου Κούλη, Patra, 1995, article: Σέκερης.
- Υπογραφές Αγωνιστών της Ελληνικής Επαναστἀσεως, Historical and Ethnological Society of Greece, Athens, 1998.
- Visvizi-Donta, D. (2003). Η ανεξαρτησία της Ελλάδος και η οικογένεια Σέκερη. Athens: Μνημοσύνη.
