= Macedonians (Greeks) =

Greek regional and historical population group

Μακεδόνες Makedónes
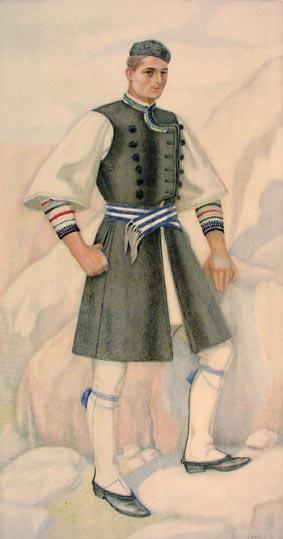
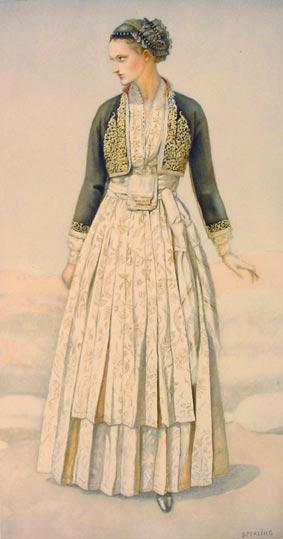
- Prints of traditional Greek Macedonian costumes

Total population
- c. 3 to 3.5 million

Regions with significant populations
- Greece: c. 2.5+ million

Languages
- Predominantly Greek

Religion
- Predominantly Greek Orthodox

Related ethnic groups
- Other Greeks

Macedonians (Greek: Μακεδόνες, Makedónes), also known as Macedonian Greeks, Greek Macedonians or Makedonians, are a regional and historical population group of ethnic Greeks, inhabiting or originating from the Greek region of Macedonia, in Northern Greece. Most Macedonians live in or around the regional capital city of Thessaloniki and other cities and towns in Greek Macedonia, while many have spread across Greece and in the diaspora.

== Name ==
The name Macedonia (Greek: Μακεδονία, Makedonía) comes from the ancient Greek word μακεδνός (Makednos). It is commonly explained as having originally meant "a tall one" or "highlander", possibly descriptive of the Makedones. The shorter English name variant Macedon developed in Middle English, based on a borrowing from the French form of the name, Macédoine.

== History ==
=== Ancient Macedonians ===
Greek populations have inhabited the regions of Lower and Upper Macedonia since ancient times. Macedon started as a small kingdom on the periphery of Classical Greek affairs, which was ruled by the Argeads from their capital at Aigai, until it was moved to Pella by Archelaus of Macedon. The rise of Macedon to become the dominant state of the entire Hellenic world occurred under the reign of Philip II, who unified most of Greece into the League of Corinth under his hegemony. Philip's son, Alexander the Great, managed in just ten years to extend his empire over the entire Persian empire which he toppled, including Egypt, and towards lands as far east as the fringes of India in today Pakistan. Alexander's adoption of the styles of government of the conquered territories was accompanied by the spread of Greek culture and learning through his vast empire. Although Alexander's empire fractured into multiple Macedonian Greek dynasties shortly after his death, his conquests left a lasting legacy, not least in the new Greek-speaking cities founded across Persian empire's former territories, heralding the Hellenistic period. In the partition of Alexander's empire among the Diadochi following the end of the Argead dynasty, Macedon first came under the rule of the Antipatrid dynasty, which was overthrown by the Antigonid dynasty after only a few years, in 294 BC. Macedon and the rest of the Hellenistic world came under the rule of Rome after the Macedonian Wars.

Ancient Macedonian is usually classified as an ancient Greek dialect of the Northwestern Doric group in particular, as findings such as Pella curse tablet indicate, and occasionally as an Aeolic Greek dialect or a distinct Hellenic language. It was gradually replaced by Attic Greek which was officially used from the 5th or early 4th century BC, and in the Hellenistic period evolved into Koine Greek.

=== Roman period ===
After fourth Macedonian War and the Roman conquest of Hellenistic Greece, Macedonians were an integral component of the people of the larger Roman province of Macedonia, with its seat at Thessalonica.

=== Byzantine period ===
Later in the Byzantine Empire (centered in Constantinople) the region saw also the influx of many ethnicities (Armenians, Slavs, Aromanians etc.) that settled in the Diocese of Macedonia where Byzantine Greeks already lived. The region had also since ancient times a significant Romaniote Jew population. The theme of Macedonia included only the further eastern parts of the previous diocese of Macedonia. After the Fourth Crusade much of central Macedonia was ruled by a Latin Crusader state based in Thessalonica, before being ruled for a while by the Epirote despot Theodore Komnenos Doukas of the Empire of Thessalonica. Subsequently it was incorporated into the Empire of Nicaea and then the restored Byzantine empire under the Palaeologan dynasty. The territory of western Macedonia was contested between the main powers in the region: the Byzantine Empire under the Palaiologos dynasty, the Despotate of Epirus, the Bulgarian Empire, and the Serbian Empire.

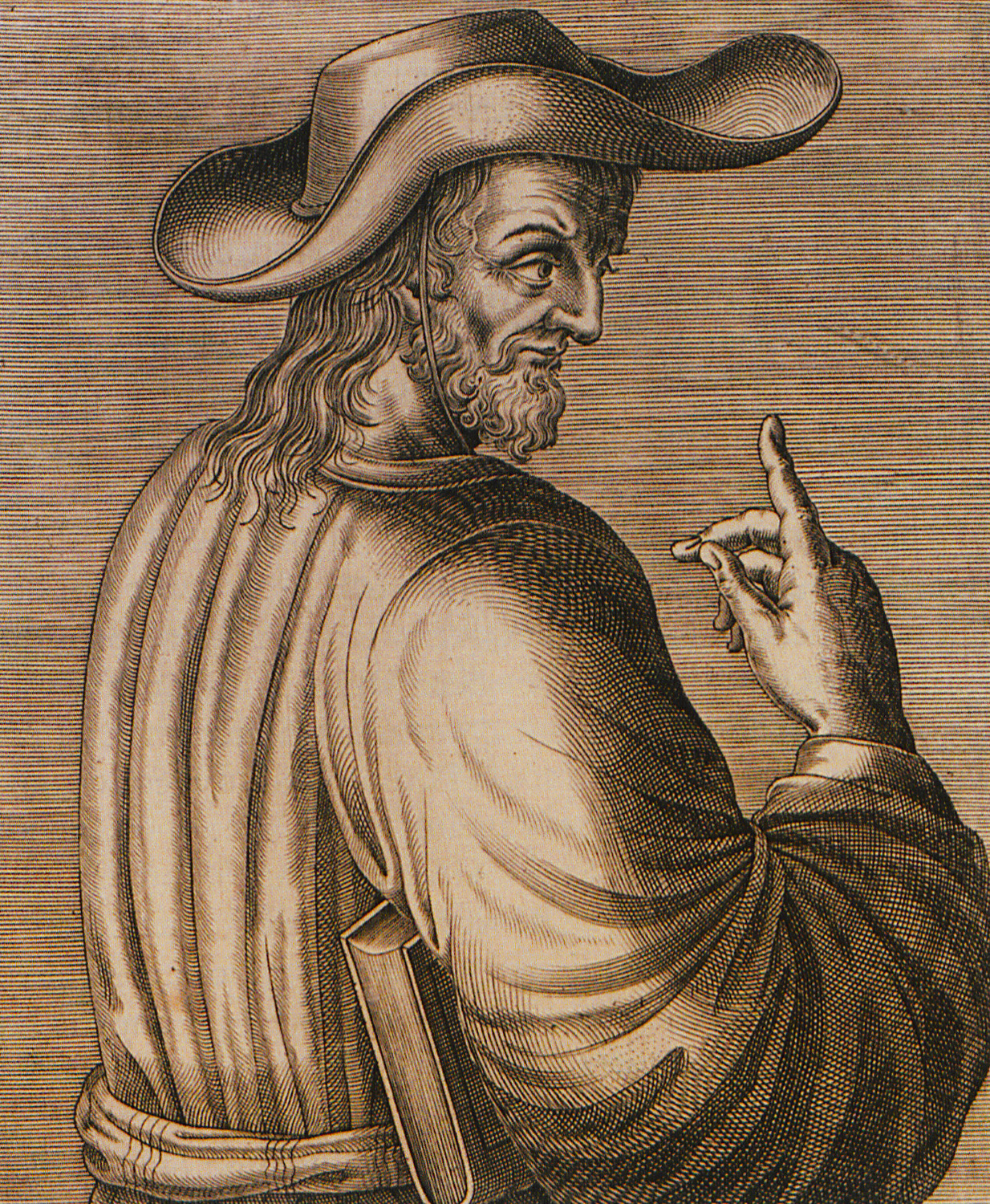
Engraved portrait of scholar Theodorus Gaza (Thessalonicensis)

=== Ottoman period ===
After the Ottoman conquest and towards the end of the Ottoman era, the term Macedonia came to signify a region in the north of the Greek peninsula different from the previous Byzantine theme. In Ottoman Macedonia, Greeks, Aromanians, Slavs, Jews, Albanians and Turks lived side-by-side but in self-contained communities, while in western Macedonia there were sizable populations of Greek Muslims such as the Vallahades. The matter of the multicultural composition of the people of Macedonia came to be known as the Macedonian Question. Thessaloniki remained the largest city where the most Macedonians resided.

=== Contribution to the Greek War of Independence ===
The Greek War of Independence refers to the efforts of the Greeks to establish an independent Greek state, at the time that Greece was part of the Ottoman Empire. The revolution was initially planned and organized through secret organizations, most notable of which the Filiki Eteria, that operated in Greece and other European regions outside the Ottoman Empire. Macedonian Greeks were actively involved in those early revolutionary movements; among the first was Grigorios Zalykis, a writer, who founded the Hellenoglosso Xenodocheio, a precursor of the Filiki Eteria. Even after the end of the Greek national revolution, there were several revolts in Macedonia with all of them having as their stated aim the union of the region with the Kingdom of Greece.

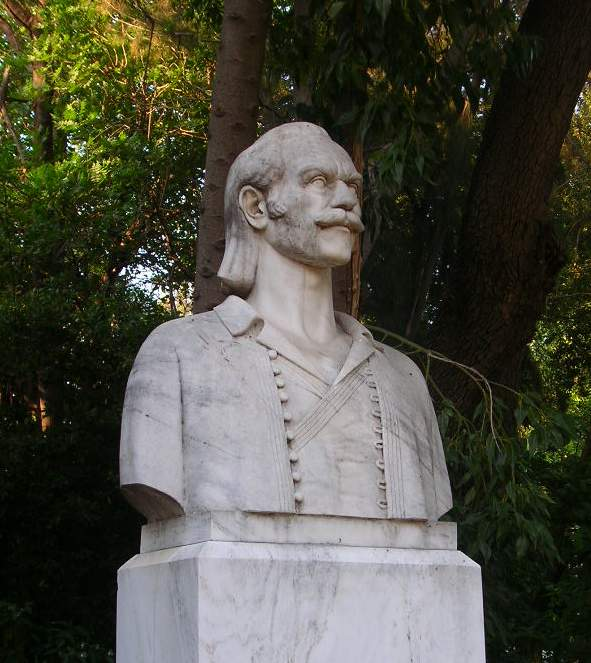
A bust of Emmanouel Pappas in Athens

The Greek revolution in Macedonia started in Chalkidiki, where the population was almost entirely Greek. On 28 May 1821, Yussuf Bey of Thessaloniki, alarmed by the danger of a general insurrection, demanded hostages from the region. At the time that his troops arrived at Polygyros, the local insurgents and monks from Mount Athos rose up and killed the Turkish voivod and his guards, compelling the Ottomans to retire to Thessaloniki. Yussuf Bey took the revenge by beheading a bishop, impaling three dignitaries while in durance and imprisoning a lot of Christians in Thessaloniki. The Ottomans also turned Muslims and Jews against the Greeks, stating that the latter intended to exterminate non-Christian populations. That was the first accomplishment of the Greek side under Emmanouel Pappas, who had assumed at the time the title of "General of Macedonia"; he managed to capture Chalkidiki and threaten Thessaloniki but, in June, the Greek forces retreated from Vasilika and were finally superseded. Letters from the period show Pappas either being addressed or signing himself as "Leader and Defender of Macedonia" and is today considered a Greek hero along with the unnamed Macedonians that fought with him. The revolution in Chalkidiki ended on 27 December, with the submission of Mount Athos to the Ottomans. While conflicts endured for some time in Macedonia, such as the one in Naousa with notable figures being Anastasios Karatasos, Aggelis Gatsos and Zafeirakis Theodosiou, it was the defeat of Pappas that was the turning point in the oppression of the Macedonian revolt in the Greek War of Independence at the time. The Destruction of Naoussa occurred on 13 April 1822.

Following the suppression of the revolution in Macedonia, Nikolaos Kasomoulis went to Thessaly with a band of men from Siatista, where he joined the forces of Nikolaos Stournaris and Georgios Karaiskakis. In 1826, he took part in the Third Siege of Missolonghi, along with his brothers Dimitrios and Georgios. He composed the written decision for attempting a final sortie, and was responsible for coordinating the actions of the various detachments participating in the sortie. During the sortie, his brother Dimitrios was mortally wounded. During the exit from Messolonghi, the Macedonian Guard consisting of local volunteers from Samarina, was the vanguard of the besieged, resulting in the most casualties from the Ottomans. The Greek folklore song "Children of Samarina" (Greek: Παιδιά της Σαμαρίνας) is associated with it.

=== 19th century Macedonian rebellions after 1821 ===
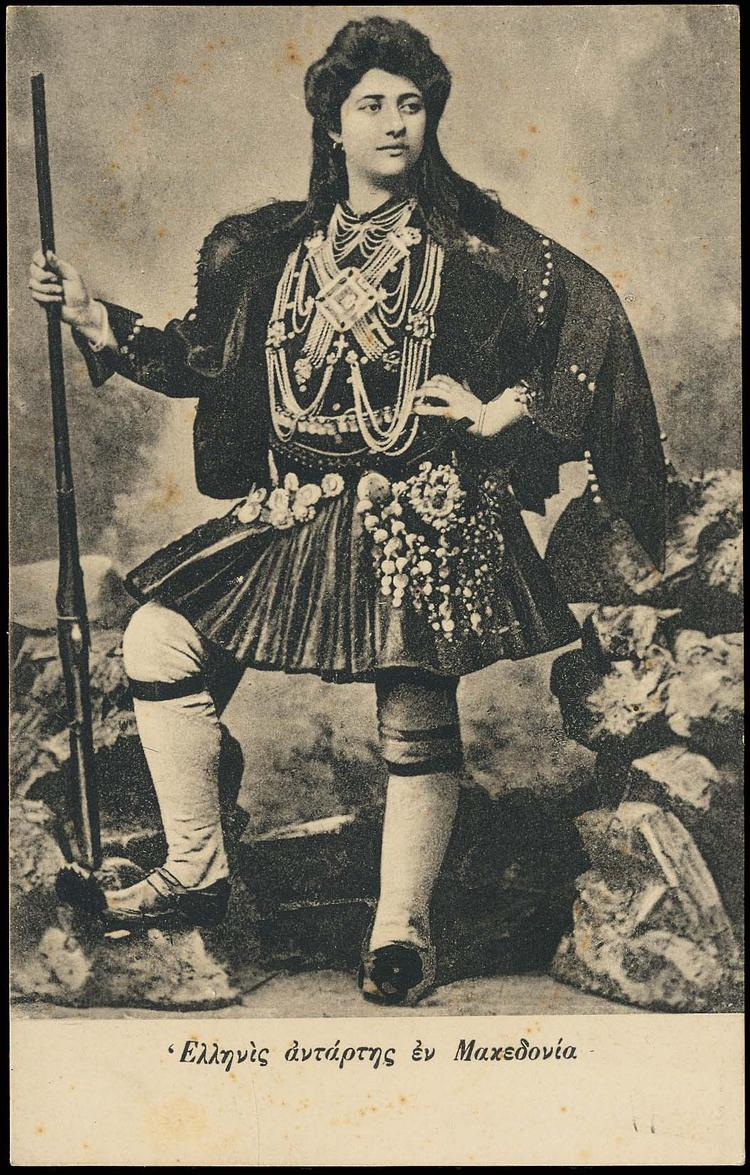
Peristera Kraka; commander of rebel forces during the 1878 Greek Macedonian rebellion

While the revolution led to the establishment of the independent modern Greek state in the south, which earned international recognition in 1832, Greek resistance movements continued to operate in the territories that remained under Ottoman control, including Macedonia as well as Thessaly, Epirus and Crete. Events of the Russo-Turkish Crimean War in 1854 ignited a new Macedonian revolt that was spawned in Chalkidiki. One of the prime instigators of the revolt was Dimitrios Karatasos, son of Anastasios Karatasos, better known as Tsamis Karatasos or Yero Tsamis. The insurrections of the Macedonian Greeks had the support of King Otto of Greece, who thought that liberation of Macedonia and other parts of Greece was possible, hoping on Russian support. The revolt however failed in its part having deteriorated the Greco-Turkish relations for the years to come.

The 1878 Greek Macedonian rebellion was prepared from both the Greek government and the leading Macedonian revolutionaries and took place in southern Macedonia, with large numbers of people from Greek and Vlach (Aromanian and Megleno-Romanian) communities taking part. In the same year the Principality of Bulgaria was established, which along with the Bulgarian Exarchate started to wield on the Slavic-speaking populations of Macedonia, with the foundation of Bulgarian schools and the affiliation of local churches to the Exarchate; Greek, Serbian and Romanian schools were also founded in several parts. After Greece's defeat in the 1897 Greco-Turkish War and 1896–1897 Macedonian rebellion, further Bulgarian involvement was encouraged in Macedonian affairs and their bands invaded the region, terrorizing populations of Greek consciousness.

=== Macedonian Struggle ===
Postcard with a Greek Macedonian revolutionary (Macedonomachos) during the Macedonian Struggle.

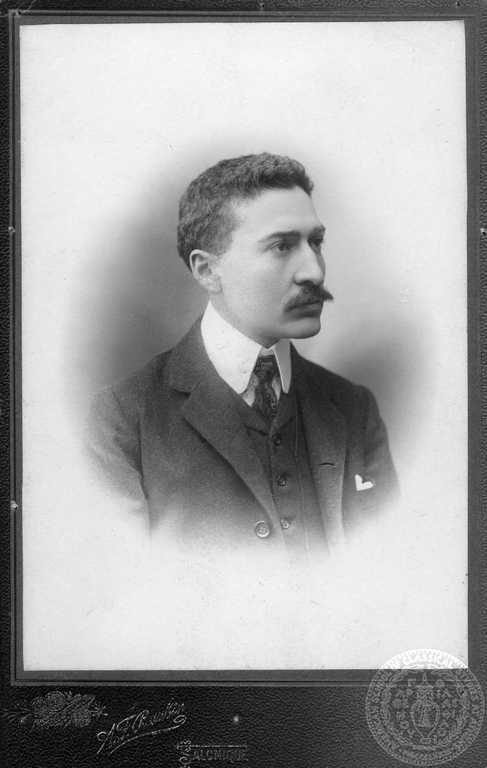
Ion Dragoumis, whose family descended from Vogatsiko, Kastoria

On the eve of the 20th century, Greek Macedonians were a minority population in a number of areas inside the multiethnic region of Macedonia, more so away from the coast. They lived alongside Slavic-speaking populations, most of whom had come to be identified as Bulgarians, while some continued to identify as members of the Rum millet (being called Grecomans by the Bulgarians), as well as other ethnicities such as Jews, Turks and Albanians. However, the Greek speakers were the predominant population in the southern zone of the region which comprised two-thirds of modern Greek Macedonia. Bulgarian actions to exploit the Bulgarian population of Macedonia with the foundation of the Internal Macedonian Revolutionary Organization and the influence of the Bulgarian Exarchate on the region, led to the Ilinden Uprising which was shut down by Ottoman forces; these events provoked Greece to help the Macedonian supporters of the Ecumenical Patriarchate of Constantinople to resist both Ottoman and Bulgarian forces, by sending military officers who formed bands made up of Macedonians and other Greek volunteers, something that resulted in the Macedonian Struggle from 1904 to 1908, which ended with the Young Turk Revolution. According to the 1904 census, conducted by Hüseyin Hilmi Pasha for the Ottoman authorities, Greeks were the predominant population in the vilayets of Thessaloniki and Monastir, outnumbered in the vilayet of Kosovo by the Bulgarians.

The Macedonian Greeks fought alongside the regular Greek army during the struggle for Macedonia, with many victims from the local population, to resist the Bulgarian expansionism and pan-Slavic danger. There are monuments in Macedonia commemorating the Makedonomachi, the local Macedonian and other Greek fighters, who took part in the wars and died to liberate Macedonia from the Ottoman rule, officially memorialized as heroes. Several of the Macedonian revolutionaries that were instrumental in the war later became politicians of the modern Greek state. The most notable of them were writer and diplomat Ion Dragoumis and his father Stephanos Dragoumis, a judge who became Prime Minister of Greece in 1910. The Dragoumis family, originating from Vogatsiko, in the Kastoria region, had a long history of participation in the Greek revolutions with Markos Dragoumis being a member of Filiki Eteria. Heroic stories from the Macedonian struggle were transcribed in many of the novels of Greek writer Penelope Delta, from narratives collected in 1932–1935 by her secretary Antigone Bellou-Threpsiadi, who was herself a daughter of a Macedonian fighter. Ion Dragoumis also wrote about his personal recollections of the Macedonian struggle in his books.

=== Balkan Wars, WWI and population exchanges ===
During the Balkan Wars, Thessaloniki became the prize city for the struggling parties, Greece, Bulgaria, and Serbia. Greece claimed the southern region which corresponded to that of ancient Macedonia, attributed as part of Greek history, and had a strong Greek presence. Following the Balkan Wars, Greece obtained most of the vilayets of Thessaloniki and Monastir, what is now Greek Macedonia, from the dissolving Ottoman Empire. After World War I and the agreement between Greece and Bulgaria on a mutual population exchange in 1919, the Greek element was reinforced in the region of Greek Macedonia, which acquired a high degree of ethnic homogeneity. During the 1923 population exchange between Greece and Turkey, there was a mass departure of Muslims and some pro-Bulgarian element from Macedonia, with the simultaneous arrival of Greek refugees from East Thrace and the Aegean and Marmara coasts of Asia Minor. The Greek refugees from Turkey constituted 45% of the population of Greek Macedonia in 1928. According to the statistics of the League of Nations in 1926, the Greeks comprised 88.8% of the total population, the Slavic-speakers 5.1%, while the remainder was mostly made up of Muslims and Jews.

==== Vallahades ====
During the Ottoman period, some Macedonian Greeks converted to Islam and were called Vallahades. With the 1923 population exchange between Greece and Turkey, the Vallahades went to Turkey. In Turkish they are known as Patriyotlar 'patriots'; sometimes Rumyöz 'Greek' is used.

=== World War II ===
During the Axis occupation of Greece at World War II, Macedonia suffered thousands of victims due to anti-partisan activity of the German occupying forces and the ethnic cleansing policies of the Bulgarian authorities. The Bulgarian Army entered Greece on 20 April 1941 at the heels of the Wehrmacht and eventually occupied the whole of northeastern Greece east of the Strymon River (Eastern Macedonia and Western Thrace), except for the Evros Prefecture, at the border with Turkey, which was occupied by the Germans. Unlike Germany and Italy, Bulgaria officially annexed the occupied territories, which had long been a target of Bulgarian irredentism, on 14 May 1941.

In Greek Macedonia, Bulgarian policy was that of extermination or expulsion, aiming to forcibly Bulgarize as many Greeks as possible and expel or kill the rest. A massive campaign was launched right from the start, which saw all Greek officials (mayors, judges, lawyers and gendarmes) deported. The Bulgarians closed the Greek schools and expelled the teachers, replaced Greek clergymen with priests from Bulgaria, and sharply repressed the use of the Greek language: the names of towns and places changed to the forms traditional in Bulgarian, and even gravestones bearing Greek inscriptions were defaced.

Evripidis Bakirtzis, leading member of the Greek Resistance and Chairman of the PEEA, addresses the National Council in Evrytania, May 1944.

Large numbers of Greeks were expelled and others were deprived of the right to work by a license system that banned the practice of a trade or profession without permission. Forced labour was introduced, and the authorities confiscated the Greek business property and gave it to Bulgarian colonists. By late 1941, more than 100,000 Greeks had been expelled from the Bulgarian occupation zone. Bulgarian colonists were encouraged to settle in Macedonia by government credits and incentives, including houses and land confiscated from the natives.

In this situation, a revolt broke out on 28 September 1941, known as the Drama revolt. It started from the city of Drama and quickly spread throughout Macedonia. In Drama, Doxato, Khoristi and many other towns and villages clashes broke out with the occupying forces. On 29 September Bulgarian troops moved into Drama and the other rebellious cities to suppress the uprising. They seized all men between 18 and 45, and executed over three thousand people in Drama alone. An estimated fifteen thousand Greeks were killed by the Bulgarian occupational army during the next few weeks and in the countryside entire villages were machine gunned and looted.

The massacres precipitated a mass exodus of Greeks from the Bulgarian into the German occupation zone. Bulgarian reprisals continued after the September revolt, adding to the torrent of refugees. Villages were destroyed for sheltering "partisans" who were in fact only the survivors of villages previously destroyed. The terror and famine became so severe that the Athens government considered plans for evacuating the entire population to German-occupied Greece. The Great Famine that broke up in 1941, that killed hundreds of thousands in the occupied country canceled these plans, leaving the population to endure those conditions for another three years. In May 1943 deportation of Jews from the Bulgarian occupation zone began as well. In the same year the Bulgarian army expanded its zone of control into Central Macedonia under German supervision, although this area was not formally annexed nor administered by Bulgaria.

Two of the leading members of the Greek resistance were Macedonians. Evripidis Bakirtzis, a veteran of the Balkan Wars, was commander of Macedonian forces of the Greek People's Liberation Army (ELAS) during the Axis Occupation of Greece in the period 1941–1944. He became the first president of the Political Committee of National Liberation — also referred to as the "Mountain Government" — an opposition government separate to the royal government-in-exile of Greece. Bakirtzis was succeeded by the second president, jurist Alexandros Svolos (an Aromanian). It was Svolos who attended the Lebanon conference in 1944 when the organization was dissolved in the wake of the formation of the national unity government of Georgios Papandreou, with Svolos later becoming a minister.

Later, during the Greek Civil War, the region of Macedonia suffered a lot due to the battles between the Hellenic Army and the Democratic Army.

== Identity ==
=== Origins ===
There had been a documented continuous Greek presence in Macedonia since antiquity, which marked the region, alongside the presence of many other groups that passed from its soil through the centuries, such as the Thracians, Illyrians, Romans, Slavs, Latins, Jews and Ottoman Turks. Today, due to the long and rich history of the region, communities of Aromanian and Slavic speakers also live in Macedonia. These communities use their various dialects in some social situations, while many also identify themselves as Greeks (sometimes also called Grecomans in neighboring countries). After the 1923 population exchange between Greece and Turkey, half of the refugees from Asia Minor, Pontus, and Eastern Thrace settled in the region.

=== Culture ===
The Macedonian flag

The Greek Macedonians have their own particular cultural heritage, which is classified as a subgroup of the national Greek culture. They admire along with the ancient Macedonians and Alexander the Great, the Byzantine legacy, the local heroes of the Greek War of Independence (like Emmanouel Pappas and Anastasios Karatasos), as well as the Makedonomachoi of the Macedonian Struggle, as their own primary heroes (in contrast to southern Greeks who mainly praise the southern heroes of the Greek War of Independence). According to late-19th century folklorist Frederick G. Abbott:

Everything that savours of antiquity is by the Macedonian peasant attributed to the two great kings of his country. His songs and traditions, of which he is vastly and justly proud, are often described as having come down " from the times of Philip and Alexander - and Heracles", a comprehensive period to which all remnants of the past are allotted with undiscriminating impartiality.

The use of the Macedonian flag is very common in the Macedonian population and the diaspora, depicting the Vergina Sun as their regional symbol, while "Famous Macedonia" is an unofficial anthem and military march. They also have some folk dances that bear the name of the region, Makedonia and Makedonikos antikristos.

==== Dialect ====
The overwhelming majority of the Greek Macedonians speak a variant of Greek, called Macedonian (Μακεδονίτικα, Makedonitika). It belongs to the northern dialect group, with phonological and few syntactical differences distinguishing it from standard Greek which is spoken in southern Greece. One of these differences is that the Macedonian dialect uses the accusative case instead of genitive to refer to an indirect object. The Macedonians also have a characteristically heavier accent, which readily identifies a speaker as coming from Macedonia. There is also a minority of Slavic-speakers that predominantly self-identifies as Greek Macedonians, primarily found in West Macedonia.

=== Expressions ===
"I myself am a Macedonian, just as another 2.5 million Greeks". This quotation of Prime Minister Kostas Karamanlis at a meeting of the Council of Europe made headlines in Greek newspapers, the above sample from Apogevmatini.

The strong sense of Macedonian identity among the Greek Macedonians had significant effect in the context of the "Macedonia naming dispute". It has led to reactions to the notion of Macedonians and Macedonian language with a non-Greek qualification, as used by the Socialist Republic of Macedonia, during the times of socialist Yugoslavia, and the contemporary North Macedonia. The dispute over the moral right to the use of the name Macedonia and its derivatives traces its origin to the Macedonian question in the 19th and early-20th century between Greece, Yugoslavia and Bulgaria. The Greek Macedonians have been objecting to these notions originally fearing territorial claims as they were noted by United States Secretary of State Edward Stettinius in 1944, under president Franklin D. Roosevelt. The dispute continued to be a reason of controversy between the three nations during the 1980s. The dispute was finally resolved in 2018 by the Prespa agreement.

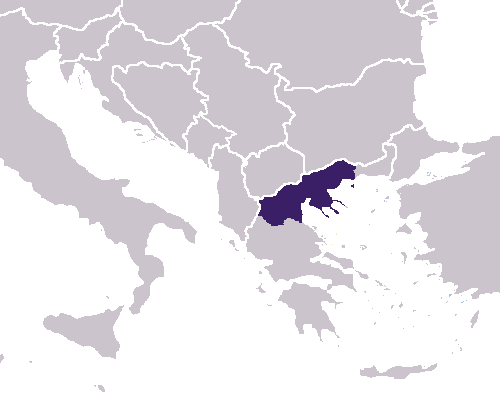
The region of Macedonia in northern Greece.

The dispute achieved international status after the breakup of Yugoslavia, when the concerns of the Macedonian Greeks rose to extreme manifestations. On 14 February 1992, about one million Greek Macedonians turned out in the streets of Thessaloniki to demonstrate their objection to the name Macedonia being a part of the name of the then newly established Republic of Macedonia using the slogan "Macedonia is Greece". Following the recognition of the Republic of Macedonia by the United States, another rally was held in Thessaloniki on 31 March 1994, while two major rallies, organized by the Macedonian Greek community in Australia, were held in Melbourne in 1992 and 1994, with around 100,000 people taking part in each of these.

Explicit self-identification as Macedonian is a typical attitude and a matter of national pride for the Greeks originating from Macedonia. Responding to issues about the Macedonia naming dispute as Prime Minister of Greece, Kostas Karamanlis – in a characteristic expression of this attitude – quoted saying in emphasis "I myself am a Macedonian, just as another 2.5 million Greeks are Macedonians" at a meeting of the Council of Europe in Strasbourg in January 2007. Both Kostas Karamanlis and his uncle Konstantinos Karamanlis, are Macedonian ethnic Greeks with origin from Serres. As President of Greece, Konstantinos Karamanlis senior had also expressed his strong sentiments regarding the Macedonian regional identity, most notably in one emotionally charged statement made in 1992.

=== Diaspora ===
Australia had been a popular destination for the waves of Macedonian Greek immigrants throughout the 20th century. Their immigration was similar to that of the rest of the Greek diaspora, affected by their socio-economic and political background in their homeland, and has been recorded mainly between 1924 and 1974. Settlers from West Macedonia were the first to arrive in Australia and dominated the immigration waves until 1954. Macedonian families from the regions of Florina and Kastoria established settlements in rural areas, while people from Kozani settled mainly in Melbourne. Only after 1954, people from Central and Eastern Macedonia began to arrive in Australia. Vasilios Kyriazis Blades from Vythos, a village in the prefecture of Kozani, is believed to be the first Macedonian settler to arrive in Australia and was landed in Melbourne in 1915; his arrival exhorted other people from his village and adjacent Pentalofos to settle in Melbourne, while several families from other districts also settled in Australia, bringing with them hundreds of people in the following decades.

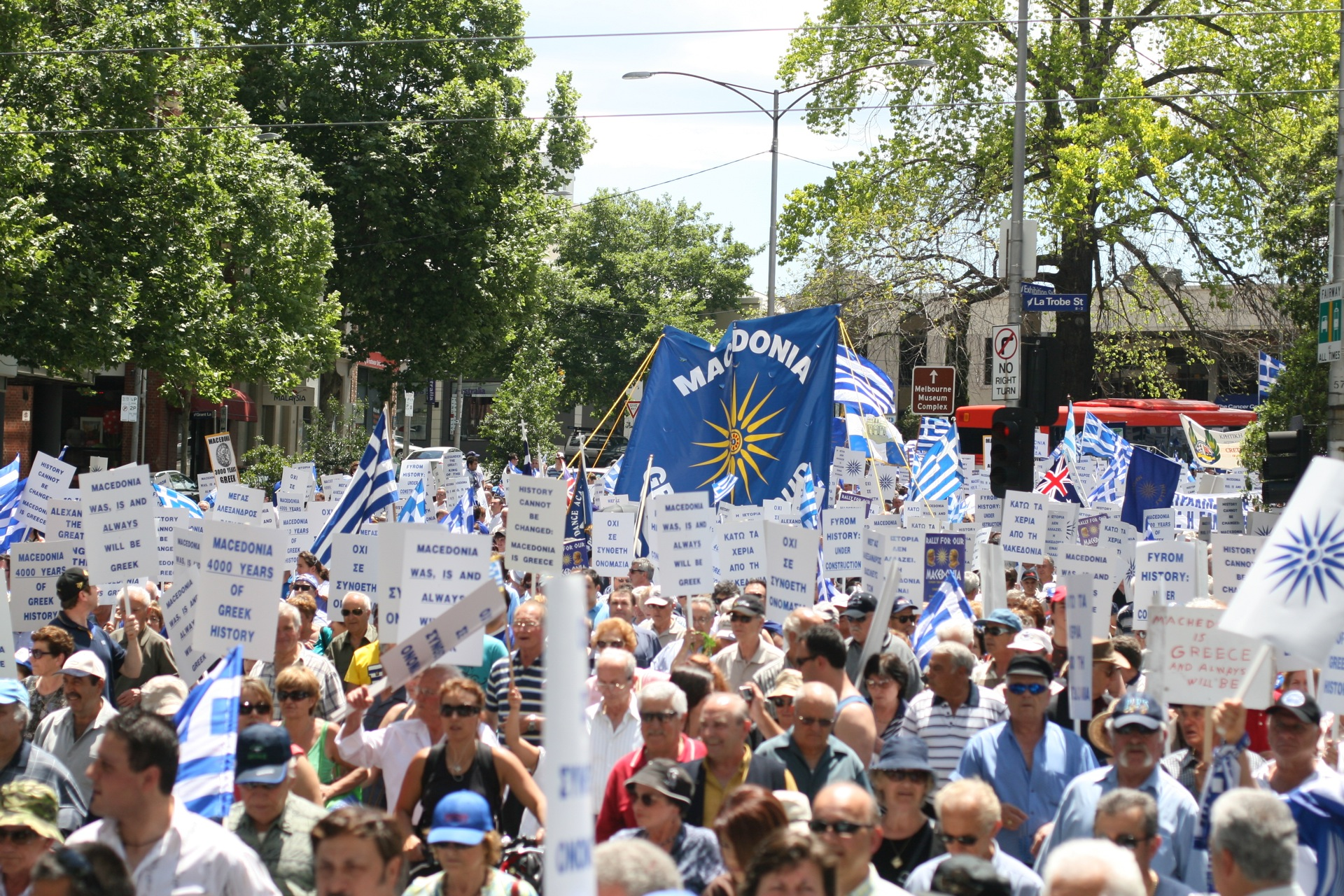
The Vergina Sun, that also appears in the regional flag, is used alongside the Greek flag by Greeks to declare their Macedonian origin in various rallies; here in Melbourne, Australia.

The geographic distribution of Macedonians before World War II differed from the distribution of other Greek settlers. While the Greeks from the islands settled mainly in the eastern states of the country attracting more Greek immigrants there, large portions of Macedonians were concentrated in western Australia. During the first years of their settlement, the Macedonians were dispersed in the Australian countryside close to the metropolitan centers, working as market gardeners, farmhands and woodcutters; there was a significant change of their occupational patterns after 1946, when they began to bring with them their families from Greece. The urbanization process for the Macedonians started after the Great Depression, when the availability of work in urban areas increased, something that led to extended move of Macedonians towards the large cities, especially Melbourne, Perth and Sydney, where they set up their own communities and regional institutions. While the majority of the settlers were indigenous Macedonians, there were also small numbers of Pontic Greeks coming from the region of Macedonia, who did not share the same regional identity and founded distinct institutions.

After World War II greater numbers from all parts of Macedonia entered Australia, many of them as refugees due to the Greek Civil War. These new waves of immigrants resulted in crowded communes and over sixty Macedonian organizations were established in the country, the most prominent of which is the Pan-Macedonian Federation of Australia, the peak umbrella organization. Apart from its regional character, the federation also serves as the voice of the Greek Macedonian communities in Australia and has taken active role in the Macedonia naming dispute. Its headquarters is in Melbourne, where the non-profit organization of Pan-Macedonian Association of Melbourne and Victoria was established in 1961, while the federation is also active in New South Wales, Queensland, South Australia and Western Australia. According to an estimate in 1988, there were around 55,000 Macedonians in Australia. More recent accounts cite 145,000 Macedonians.

Other large Greek Macedonian communities can also be found particularly in the United States, Canada and Great Britain. The main institutions which were established by some of these communities or are closely affiliated with them are:

Pan-Macedonian Association USA, founded in 1947 in New York City by Greek Americans whose origins were from Macedonia to unite all the Macedonian communities of the United States, works to collect and distribute information on the land and people of Macedonia, organize lectures, scientific discussions, art exhibitions, educational and philanthropic activities, while they have funded work in the Library of New York University with books about the Macedonian history and culture. Additionally, they promote the social welfare and educational advancement of the inhabitants of Macedonia.

The Pan-Macedonian Association of Canada is the association's branch for the Greek Canadians of Macedonian origin.

The Macedonian Society of Great Britain, founded in 1989 in London by Macedonian immigrants, promotes the Macedonian history, culture and heritage, organizes lectures and presentations, as well as social events and gatherings for the British Greeks.

Panhellenic Macedonian Front, a Greek political party founded in 2009 by politician Stelios Papathemelis and professor Kostas Zouraris to run for the 2009 European Parliament elections, which is affiliated with several Macedonian diaspora organizations.

== Notable Greek Macedonians ==
- Athanasios Christopoulos, writer, poet.
- Grigorios Zalykis, writer, founder of the Hellenoglosso Xenodocheio.
- Emmanouel Pappas, leader of the Greek War of Independence in Macedonia. Other prominent personalities of the war included Georgios Lassanis, Nikolaos Kasomoulis, Christoforos Perraivos, Ioannis Skandalidis, Anastasios Polyzoidis, Anastasios Karatasos, Aggelis Gatsos and Zafeirakis Theodosiou.
- Stephanos Dragoumis, formed the Macedonian Committee in 1904 in Athens, originated from Vogatsiko in western Macedonia and his son Ion Dragoumis, politicians with contribution in the Macedonian Struggle.
- Georgios Modis jurist, politician, writer and participant in the Macedonian Struggle.
- Gonos Yotas, a Slavophone Greek Macedonian fighter in the Macedonian Struggle from Plugar, a village near Giannitsa.
- Kottas, a Slavophone Greek Makedonomachos.
- Ioannis Papafis, Konstantinos Bellios, benefactors.
- Stamatios Kleanthis, Xenophon Paionidis, Lysandros Kaftanzoglou, Aristotelis Zachos, architects.
- Emilios Riadis, composer.
- Evripidis Bakirtzis, Hellenic Army officer and leading member of the National Resistance, nicknamed "the Red Colonel" from his pen name in the communist Rizospastis.
- Alexandros Svolos (1892–1956), President of Political Committee of National Liberation during WW2
- Andreas Tzimas (1909–1972), known also under his World War II-era nom de guerre of Vasilis Samariniotis, a leading Communist politician, best known as one of the leading triumvirate of the Greek People's Liberation Army
- Thanasis Hatzis (1905–1982), EAM's Secretary General
- George Zorbas, the character upon which Nikos Kazantzakis based the fictional protagonist of his novel Zorba the Greek.
- Panagiotis Fasoulas and Dimitris Diamantidis, prominent basketball players and European champions with Greece in 1987 and 2005 respectively. Fasoulas was also mayor of Piraeus, while Diamantidis was announced European Player of the Year in 2007. Other basketball players include Giannis Ioannidis, Nikos Hatzivrettas, Kostas Tsartsaris, Nikolaos Zisis and Fedon Matheou, widely considered to be the Patriarch of Greek basketball.
- Theodoros Zagorakis, captain of the Greece national football team that won the UEFA Euro 2004, and other players of the 2004 Euro team such as Vasilios Tsiartas, Traianos Dellas, Vasilios Lakis, Pantelis Kafes, Nikos Dabizas, Zisis Vryzas, Georgios Samaras (from his father's side) and Angelos Charisteas. Other notable figures of the Greek football include Kleanthis Vikelidis, Giorgos Koudas and Alketas Panagoulias.
- Several Olympic medalists: Georgios Roubanis (Melbourne 1956, bronze medal), Voula Patoulidou (Barcelona 1992, gold), Ioannis Melissanidis (Atlanta 1996, gold), Dimosthenis Tampakos (Athens 2004, gold), Alexandros Nikolaidis (Athens 2004, silver medal), Elisavet Mystakidou (Athens 2004, silver), Anna Korakaki (Rio 2016, gold)
- Konstantinos Karamanlis, former President and Prime Minister of Greece, as well as his nephew Kostas Karamanlis who also served as Prime Minister.
- Christos Sartzetakis, former President of Greece.
- Yannis Boutaris, former mayor of Thessaloniki
- Herbert von Karajan (originally Karajanis) (1908–1989), an Austrian born orchestra and opera conductor who was descended paternally from Greek-Macedonian ancestors who migrated centuries earlier from Kozani to Chemnitz, Germany and then to Saxony and subsequently to Vienna where they held key academic, medical, and administrative posts.
- Thalia Flora-Karavia, artist and painter
- Achilles Papapetrou, physicist
- Vassilis Vassilikos, writer. Other writers include Georgios Vafopoulos, Anthoula Vafopoulou
- Giannis Dalianidis, Takis Kanellopoulos, Titos Vandis, Costas Hajihristos, Zoe Laskari, Kostas Voutsas: notable figures of the Greek cinema.
- Patrick Tatopoulos, movie production designer and is a French-Greek with Macedonian descent on his father's side.
- Figures of the musical scene: Manolis Chiotis, Giorgos Hatzinasios, Marinella, Dionysis Savvopoulos, Antonis Remos, Despina Vandi
- Of partial Macedonian descent, from their father, were also educator Manolis Triantafyllidis, writer Demetrios Vikelas and composer Spyridon Samaras.
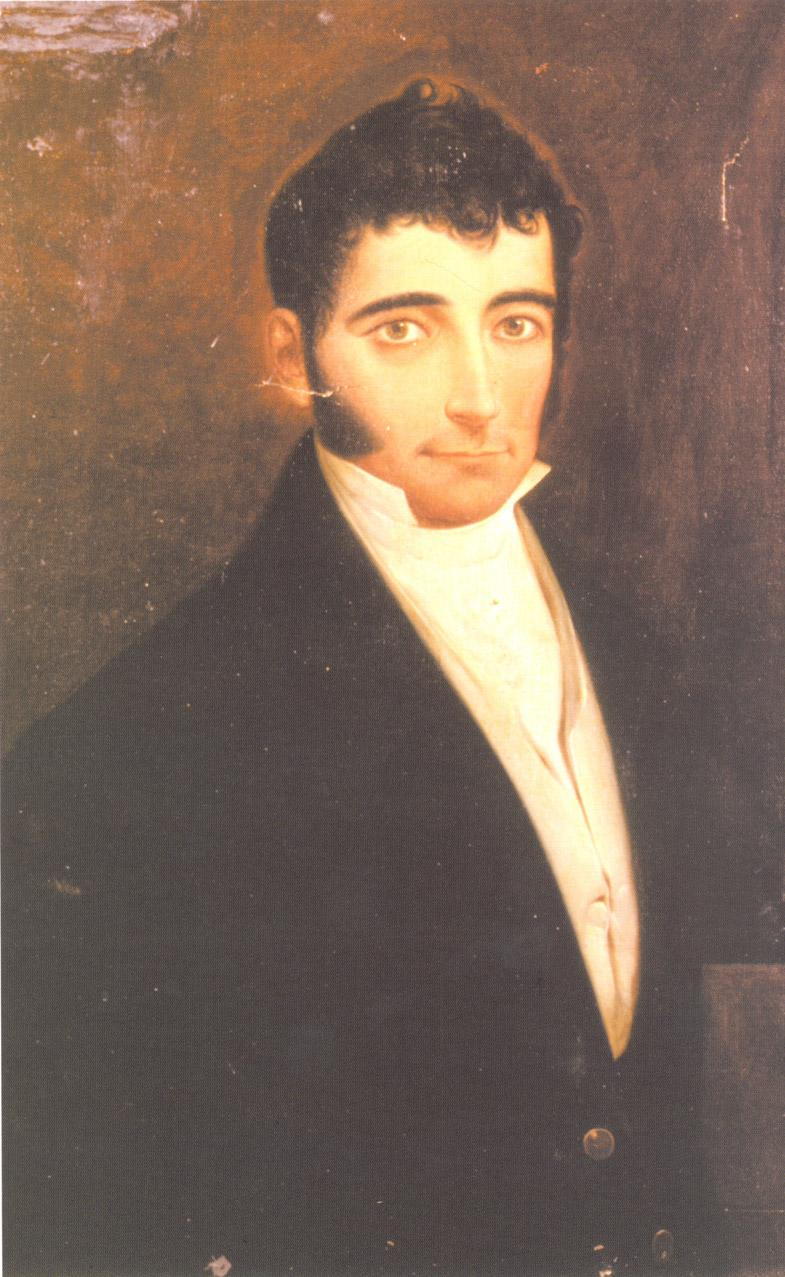
Ioannis Papafis, benefactor from Thessaloniki

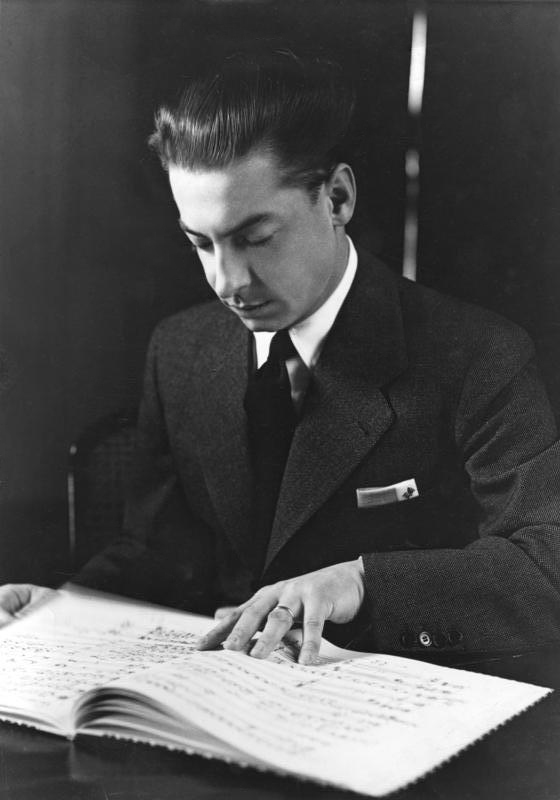
Herbert von Karajan (1908–1989), who is considered to have been one of the greatest conductors of all time, was descended paternally from Greek-Macedonian ancestors.

== See also ==
- Macedonian dynasty
- Elimiotis
- Orestis (region)
- Macedonian league
- Greeks in North Macedonia
