= Georgios Sekeris =

Signature of Georgios Sekeris

Georgios Sekeris (died 1822) was a member of the Filiki Eteria and a fighter of the Greek War of Independence. He was the first to be initiated into the Filiki Eteria in Moscow by Nikolaos Skoufas in 1814.

== Biography ==
He was the younger brother of Panagiotis and Athanasios Sekeris. He took his first steps in education at the well-known school of Dimitsana and later, in 1808, he followed his brother Panagiotis in Constantinople, where he continued his studies. Georgios didn't wish to become a trader, but he wanted to study military science instead. In 1811, Panagiotis Sekeris sent him to apprentice at the centers of Greek intellectuals (Bucharest, Iași, Moscow, Vienna). In 1813 he went to Paris, where he became acquainted with Adamantios Korais. In 1814 Georgios traveled to Moscow, because he wanted to visit his brother Athanasios. While he was there, he met Athanasios Tsakalov, an acquaintance from Paris, who told him about the purpose of the Filiki Eteria, a secret organization that he recently founded together with Nikolaos Skoufas and Emmanuil Xanthos. Georgios was the first member who was initiated into the Filiki Eteria. On his way back to Paris he passed Vienna, where he met with Anthimos Gazis, a priest and scholar from Milies in Pelion, and initiated him into the Filiki Eteria as well.

When the Greek Revolution broke out he decided to rerun home. He set off from Marseille on 18 July 1821, on a brig charted by Alexandros Mavrokordatos, and arrived at Missolonghi on 21 July. From Messolonghi he went to the camp in Trikorfa, where Demetrios Ypsilantis was. Georgios followed Alexandros Mavrokordatos to Zarakova, where proestoi, the local notables, gathered in order to form the country's governing body. When he returned to Trikorfa, the Siege of Tripolitsa had begun. There, Georgios excelled due to his great abilities and bravery. He was appointed chieftain of Mantineian army but later his duties were restricted and he became an army leader of Tripolitsa province. He took part in the Siege of Old Patras, where he excelled in the battle on 9 March 1822, and in the Battles of Dervenakia, of Agios Sostis and of Agionori on the 26–28 July 1822.

When Dramalis's army was defeated they fled to Corinth, but they were followed by Theodoros Kolokotronis, who led the siege of Corinth. Then, the people from Tripolitsa stayed in Dervenakia under the leadership of Georgios Sekeris. However, Georgios exhausted by the hardships of war fell ill and was taken to Tripoli, where he died on 12 November 1822.
