= Antonios Komizopoulos =

Greek merchant and revolutionary leader

Antonios Komizopoulos (Greek: Αντώνιος Κομιζόπουλος) was a 19th-century Greek merchant and the 4th member of Filiki Eteria (The Friendly Society).

== Biographical elements ==
Komizopoulos descended from Plovdiv. In 1815, while he was in Moscow, he became a member of Filiki Eteria. Three years later—on the initiative of Nikolaos Skoufas—he joined the Invisible Authority and signed with the letters Α.Ε. He initiated many important people into Filiki Eteria including Christoforos Perraivos and spent much of his wealth for the Greek Revolution. Emmanuil Xanthos saved several of Kozimopoulos' letters both to himself and to others from the organisation.

== Sources ==
- Papyrus Larousse Britannica, v.29
