= Galatis family =

Galatis (or Galati) Γαλάτης
- Greek noble family
- Current region: Extant in Ithaca, elsewhere in Greece (Athens, Thessaloniki), Romania, and in the Greek diaspora
- Origin: Ionian Islands (possibly originally from Apulia)
- Members: Nikolaos Galatis; Giannis Galatis
- Distinctions: Noble privileges granted by the Tocco family, later recognised by the Venetians

The Galatis family or Galati (Greek: Γαλάτης; Venetian Italian: Galati) is an old noble family from the island of Ithaca, Greece, who came to prominence as local nobles first under the rule of the Tocco family in the 14th and 15th centuries. The family is later listed in both the 1803 and 1804 catalogues of nobles on the island. Among the members of the family are the pre-revolutionary figure Nikolaos Galatis (1792-1819) and the Athenian fashion designer Giannis Galatis.

== Early history and origins ==
It is speculated that the family may have earlier come from Italy, perhaps from Apulia, where a family with the same name has existed for centuries.

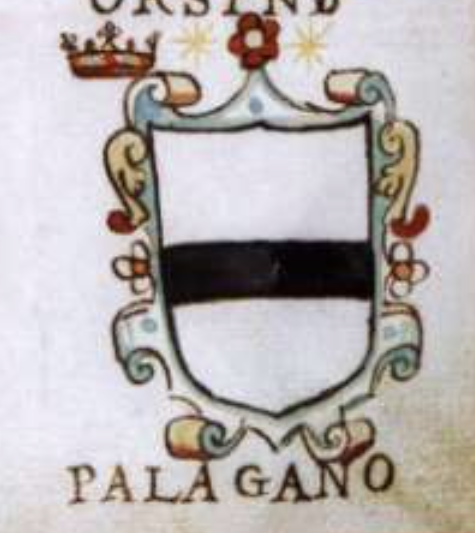
Arms of the Palagano family, 15th century relations of the Galati

The first noble privileges are obtained in connection to service for the Tocco family who ruled Cephalonia, Ithaca and Zakynthos. In 1403, Leonardo II Tocco confirmed and recognised noble privileges on the island of Zakynthos belonging to Francilo (or Franculo) Pelegano which had earlier been granted by Leonardo I to his parents, Nikolaos Palagano and Eudokia (daughter of Nikolaos Galatis). Upon the island of Ithaca itself, Leonardo Tocco (I or II) granted certain rights and privileges together with property to the Galati on the island, and named Kaisar (Caesar) Galatis among the nobles of the state.

== Venetian period ==
After a short occupation by the Ottomans, the Venetians took control of the island in 1503. The island of Ithaca was repopulated in order to promote agriculture on the island, but the Galati were found already to be resettling the island of their own accord, independent of the official re-settlement by the authorities. It is possible that they had left the island at the end of the 15th century when the region was captured by the Ottomans. On returning, they made a claim to the island as belonging to their own property. With them they brought livestock and seeds in order to establish agricultural activity on the island.

Over time, the economy of the island evolved, but it is known that the Galati maintained privileges and land interests on the island, since their earlier noble privileges under the Tocco were again recognised by the Venetians. In 1558 the then Provveditor of Cephalonia, Zuan Dolfin confirmed the noble status of the Galatis family under Venetian rule, and this was restated by twenty of his successors:

'la famiglia Galati al tempo del signor Lunardo De Tochis erano tornati, et trattati per persone civili et non erano sottoposti a niuna gravezza.' "the Galatis family returned in the time of the lord Leonardo Tocco, and they were treated as civili (i.e. the class of citizens) and they were not subjected to any burdens."

== Post-Venetian period ==
Some essence of the noble status of the family was maintained for centuries despite the changing economic environment, since the family is found in both the 1803 and 1804 Libri d’Oro, two late registers of nobility on the island. The Galati were the only holders of noble privileges on the island of Ithaca under the Tocco and later under the Venetians. The family was originally based in the old village of Anogi (or Anoghi), near Mount Neriton, and continued to exist there into the 20th century. A branch was later established at the nearby village of Kioni.

== Connections to other families ==
The Ithacan family Galati are not believed to have any connection to the Chian Galatis family, who came to prominence much later with certain financial interests in European banking and shipping. Despite this, these two distinct families are often confused, with some erroneously attributing the Ithacan Nikolaos Galatis (1792-1819) to the Chian family.

The revolutionary Nikolaos Galatis (1792-1819) claimed to be a cousin of Count Ioannis Capodistria but this was denied by the latter and the precise connection was not made out.

== Notable members ==
- Franculo (Galati) Palagano (early 15th century), castellan of the fort of St Stephen, Zakynthos
- Caesar Galatis (15th century), early member of the family on Ithaca granted with noble privileges by the Tocco family
- Anastasios Galatis (18th century), notary of Argostoli 1728-1757
- Nikolaos Galatis (1792-1819) pre-revolutionary figure and member of the Filiki Eteria
- Eustathios Galatis, archimandrite, member of the Filiki Eteria, brother of the pre-revolutionary Nikolaos
- Dionysios S. Galatis (d. 1893), mayor of Larisa
- Dionysios Galatis (b. 1891), trader in China and consul of Greece in Tianjin, China (1930s)
- Platon Galatis (1919-1993), musician from Thessaloniki
- Giannis Galatis (1946-), fashion designer from Athens
