= Panagiotis Sekeris =

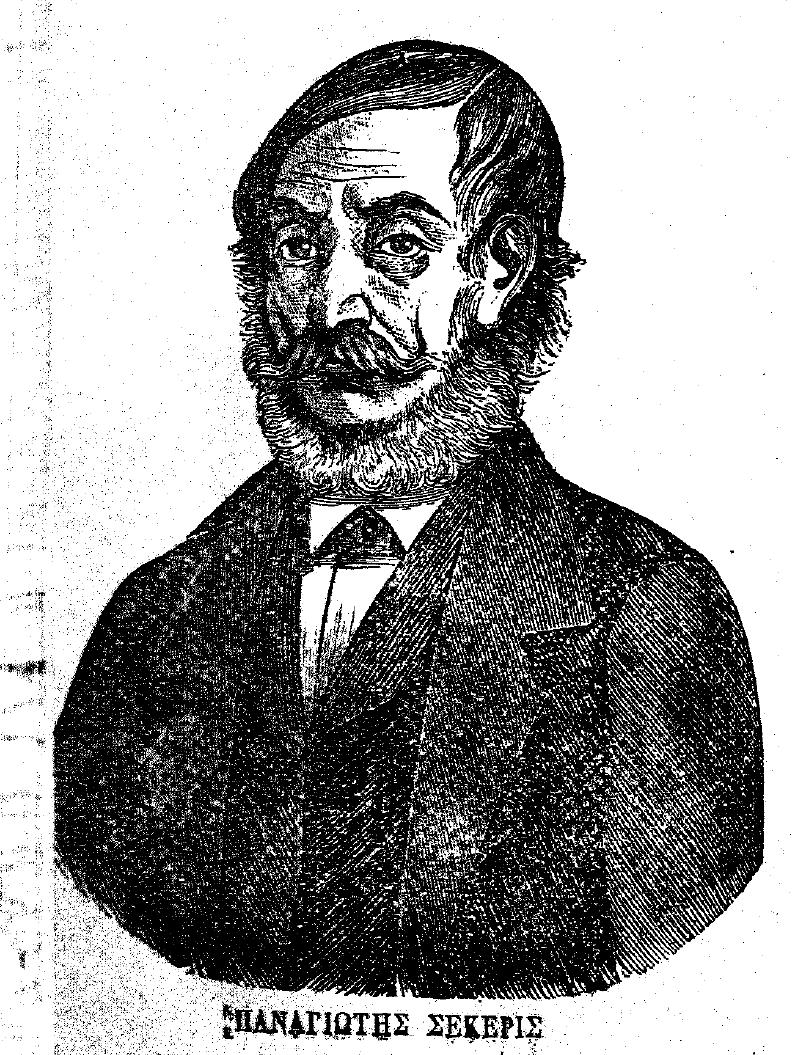
Panagiotis Sekeris

Panagiotis Sekeris (Tripolitsa 1783 – Nafplio 1846) was a merchant and a leading member of Filiki Eteria (Society of Friends). His archive, an important and reliable source for the history of Filiki Eteria, consists of 14 documents and a very comprehensive manuscript, which contains accounts of Filiki Eteria, copies of 89 letters of Panagiotis Sekeris from Constantinople and Odessa, from August 1818 until August 1821, as well as a list of 520 members with the marks of recognition of each one.

== Early years ==
Panagiotis Sekeris was born in Tripolitsa, in 1783 and was the son of the merchant Dimitrios Sekeris. He attended the thriving school of Dimitsana. In 1798, at the age of 15, he witnessed his father’s murder, which forced him to leave Tripoli and flee to Spetses. There, he stayed with his uncle and worked as an apprentice at his merchant business. Shortly afterwards, he went to Constantinople, where he soon became a highly capable wholesale merchant with a fleet of 15 ships, while, at the same time, he established branches of his business in Odessa and Moscow.

== Involvement in the Filiki Eteria ==
Sekeris was initiated into the Filiki Eteria by Panagiotis Anagnostopoulos on 5 May 1818, in Constantinople, as it seems from a letter that he sent to his brother, Georgios Sekeris. Georgios was studying in Paris and was the first member who was initiated into the Filiki Eteria, immediately after its establishment (the initiation, by Nikolaos Skoufas, took place in Moscow in 1814).

Sekeris was then 35 years old and his cash contribution to Filiki Eteria was 10,000 kuruş, which was more than double the amount that Filiki Eteria had managed to raise within four years since its foundation. The initiation of Panagiotis Sekeris was crucial, because, through him, Filiki Eteria entered the circles of Constantinople merchants, who supported the economy, while his influence and abilities facilitated the expansion of Society’s network. Moreover, he initiated several merchants and ship captains from the Aegean and Ionian Sea himself.

After Skoufas died in July 1818, by a joint decision of Xanthos and Anagnostopoulos, they revealed to Sekeris all about the "Invisible Authority" to ensure his full trust in the purposes of the Filiki Eteria. He calmly accepted the secrets of the Society and vowed that he would offer his life and his possessions for its purposes. He became one of the 16 leaders that formed the “Invisible Authority", but also the Society’s treasurer. Panagiotis Sekeris, after the departure of Anagnostopoulos and Xanthos from Constantinople in February 1819, became the only head of the Society. All the allegiance letters and the contributions of new members had to be addressed to him. He also had to meet the economic demands of the prominent members and inform the dispersed leaders. To meet the growing financial needs he was forced to use not only his prestige but mainly his personal fortune, which naturally began to decline. In 1820, having spent most of his fortune, he had to take loans from merchants in Constantinople for the current expenses of the Society. That resulted in the bankruptcy of his company.

== Years of the Greek Revolution ==
When the Greek Revolution broke out, Sekeris was forced to leave Constantinople and he went to Odessa, leaving behind his entire estate, which value exceeded one million kuruş. Considering his stay in Odessa temporary, he hoped that they would call him to offer his services to his homeland. But his hope proved to be false, which caused him great bitterness. A bitterness that intensified by the inability to contribute to the Revolution financially or physically by taking part in battle. However, although he was no longer financially able, he continued to offer its services to other compatriots who had taken refuge in Odessa.

== Returning to Greece ==
Panagiotis Sekeris remained in Odessa until 1830, when he and his family moved to Greece and settled in Nafplio. Modest as it was, he did not get any significant public positions. He was hired as a tax collector first in Hydra and then in Nafplio, where he died in poverty. Despite his efforts, he failed to compensate for his material and moral contribution to the Struggle for Independence. Panagiotis Sekeris died on 29 January 1847, at the age of 64.
