= Grigorios Zalykis =

Greek scholar, writer and diplomat (1785–1827)

Grigorios Zalykis (Greek: Γρηγόριος Ζαλύκης; French: Grégoire Zalykis) (1785 – 4 October 1827) was a Greek scholar, writer and diplomat. He was the founder of the "Greek-speaking Hotel" (Hellenoglosso Xenodocheio or Ελληνόγλωσσο Ξενοδοχείο), a secret organization established in Paris in 1809 to assist Greeks against Ottoman rule.

== Biography ==
Grigorios Zalykis was of Aromanian origin. He was born in Thessaloniki in 1785. His father was Georgios Zalykis, and sometimes he was given the usual Ottoman suffix of "oglu", as in Zalykoglous (Zalykis' son). He attended school in his hometown and then went to Bucharest to study with the academic Lampros Fotiadis. With Fotiadis, Grigorios Zalykis studied Greek and Latin literature.

In 1802, the potentate of Walachia, Skarlatos Kallimachis, sent him to Paris for political issues. He settled there and became Marie-Gabriel-Florent-Auguste de Choiseul-Gouffier's secretary, helping him to publish his book Voyage pittoresque en Grèce. Zalykis wrote two dictionaries, one in French and one in modern Greek.

Zalykis was the founder of the "Greek-speaking Hotel", Hellenoglosso Xenodocheio, a secret organization established in 1809. It was a precursor of Filiki Eteria and sought to mobilize the Greeks against Ottoman rule.

In 1816, Zalykis became the first secretary of the Ottoman embassy in Paris. He worked there until 1820, then went back to Bucharest. After the uprising of the Greek War of Independence, he went to Transilvania and then to Bessarabia where he wrote the book Dialogue about the Greek revolution in 1822.

Zalykis went to Saint Petersburg, where he met emperor Alexander I of Russia and took important financial help. Going back to Paris, he developed a brain fever and died on 4 October 1827.
