= Marigo Zarafopoula =

Marigo Zarafopoula (Greek: Μαριγώ Ζαραφοπούλα) was a person of the Greek War of Independence and member of the Filiki Eteria (Society of Friends), a secret 19th-century organization whose purpose was to overthrow the Ottoman rule of Greece and establish an independent Greek state.

== Biography ==
She was born and lived in Tatavla ( nowadays Kurtuluş ), a district of Istanbul whose once significant Greek population has disappeared due to massacres and forced expulsions. She was initiated into Filiki Eteria in early 1821 by her brother Vasilis Chatzisarafis who was captured and beheaded by Turks in 1821. When Assimakis Theodorou, a member of Filiki Etairia betrayed the secrets of the organization to the Ottoman authorities, Zarafopoula using her acquaintance with different officials tried and succeeded to learn more details about the event. Meanwhile, using the same acquaintances as well her important estate, she managed to help the sons of Petrobey Mavromichalis to escape from Constantinople, where they were kept prisoners. When her and her brother's involvement as well to the Filiki Eteria was revealed, she was persecuted, while her brother was beheaded on 23 April 1821. Finally, after great hardships, Zarafopoula managed to travel to Hydra in Greece, bringing with her a large sum of money which she gave for the needs of the revolution.

In Peloponnese, she worked as a spy for Theodoros Kolokotronis and Demetrios Ypsilantis within Tripolitsa and Nafplio. In the following years, she funded Charles Nicolas Fabvier’s campaign in Karystos and the campaign of Hatzimichalis Dalianis in Crete. During the years of the revolution she married the officer Georgios or Theodoros Stefanou and they had two children. Stefanou died in battle. Zarafopoula, being poor at the end of her life, died after 1865, year in which she requested a pension.

The contribution of Zarafopoula to the Greek Revolution certified with documents several important chieftains like Gennaios Kolokotronis, Chatzichristos Voulgaris, Nikitas Stamatelopoulos etc.

== Bibliography ==
- Koula Xiradaki [Κούλα Ξηραδάκη], Γυναίκες του '21 – Προσφορές, ηρωισμοί και θυσίες, εκδόσεις Δωδώνη, Αθήνα – Γιάννινα, 1995.
- Σύγχρονος Εγκυκλοπαίδεια Ελευθερουδάκη, vol. 11, p. 170 – 171.
