= Flag of Macedonia (Greece) =

Greek regional flag

Macedonia
- Use: Civil flag
- Proportion: 2∶3
- Design: A golden Vergina sun on a blue field

The flag of Macedonia (Greek: Σημαία της Μακεδονίας) displays a Vergina Sun with 16 rays in the centre of a blue field. This flag, as well as the Vergina Sun, is commonly used as an unofficial symbol of the Greek region of Macedonia and its subdivisions. It is also used by organisations of the Greek Macedonian diaspora, such as the Pan-Macedonian Association chapters of the United States and Australia, as well as numerous commercial enterprises and private citizens.

== Overview ==
The Vergina Sun is an official state emblem of Greece, and the Greek government proceeded to lodge a copyright claim as a state symbol at the World Intellectual Property Organization in 1995.

It is unclear when the flag was adopted, but it was most likely in use by the late 1980s after the archaeological discovery of the star by Manolis Andronikos in Vergina. The first flag of North Macedonia, then the Republic of Macedonia, following its independence from Yugoslavia in 1992, had the same design as the flag of Greek Macedonia, but on a red background with proportions 1:2. This caused controversy in Greece, which was already using that symbol for its own province of Macedonia, and the then Republic of Macedonia changed its flag to the current design in 1995.

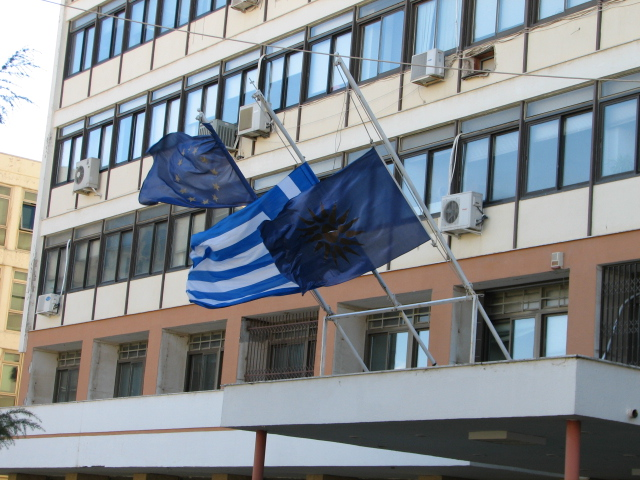
Vergina Sun flag at the Kozani Prefecture, along with the European flag and the flag of Greece.

== See also ==
- List of Greek flags
- Flags of country subdivisions
- Vergina Tombs
- Ancient Greek art
