= Stelios Papathemelis =

Greek politician and lawyer

- Στέλιος Παπαθεμελής
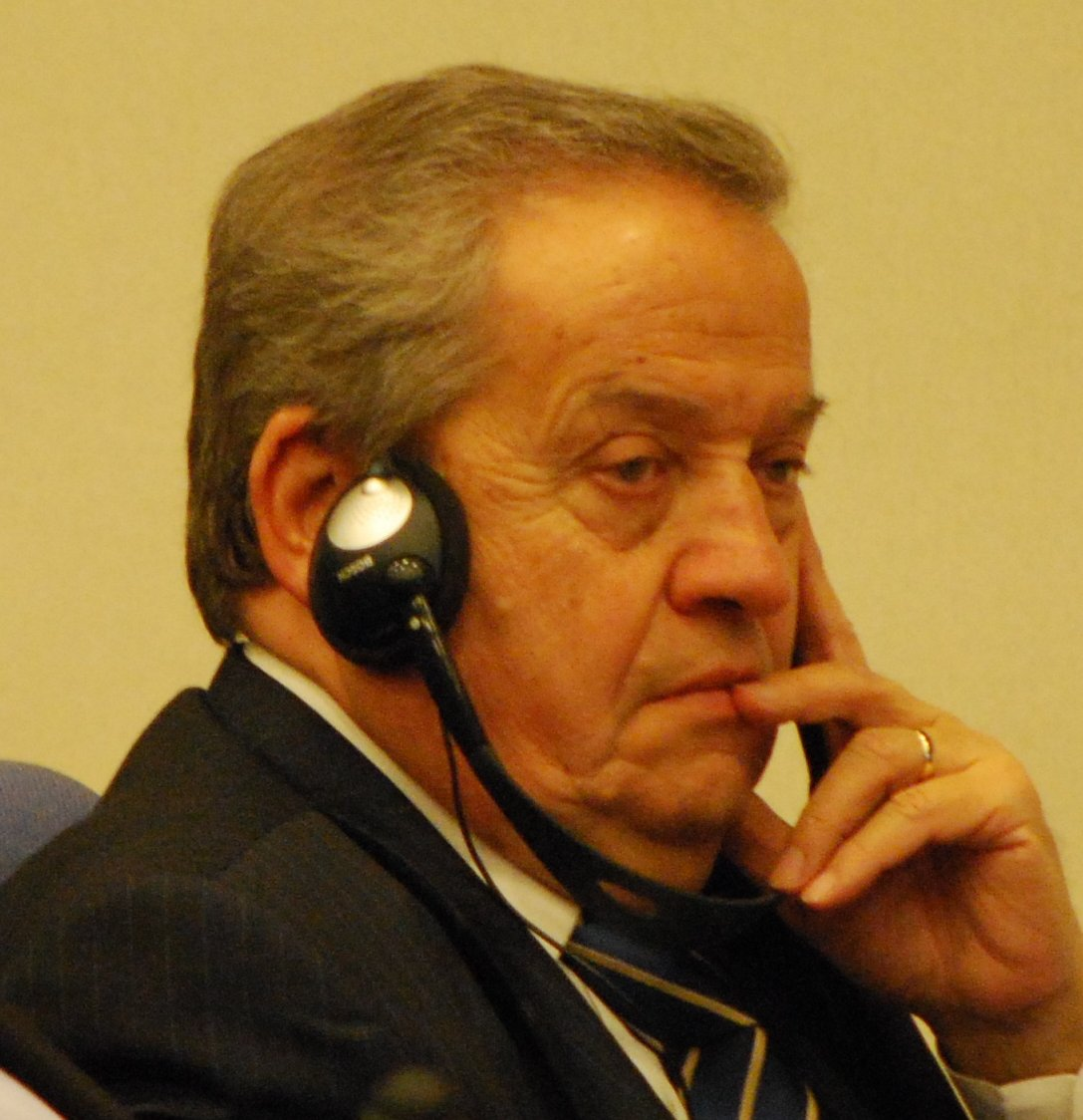
- Stelios Papathemelis

Deputy Education Minister of Greece
- In office 1982–1985

Minister for Macedonia and Thrace of Greece
- In office 1987–1989

Minister for Public Order of Greece
- In office 1993–1995

Personal details
- Born: January 1938 (age 88) Thessaloniki, Greece
- Party: EK-ND, EDIK, PASOK, New Democracy, Democratic Revival, Panhellenic Macedonian Front
- Education: Aristotle University of Thessaloniki

Stelios Papathemelis (Greek: Στέλιος Παπαθεμελής; born January 1938) is a Greek politician and lawyer. He studied law at the Aristotle University of Thessaloniki.

== Political career ==
He was elected for the first time MP with EK-ND in the elections of 1974. He was re-elected with EDIK in 1977. Afterwards, he joined PASOK and was appointed Deputy Education Minister in 1982-1985, Minister for Macedonia and Thrace in 1987-1989 and Minister for Public Order in 1993-1995. During his term as Minister of Public Order, he faced strong opposition, mainly by the owners of the night clubs and bars, for a 2am curfew he imposed on clubs and bars. His decisions were seen as trying to control nightlife and as being contrary to the Greek spirit of leisure.

He later left PASOK and was elected as an independent MP on the New Democracy list for Thessaloniki in the 2004 elections.

Though he started his political career in a liberal party and was later in a socialdemocratic one, he is now considered a left-wing nationalist and "traditional centrist patriot". He has a privileged relationship with the Church of Greece.

== Party leader ==
In March, 2007 he announced the foundation of a new political party, Democratic Revival. In the general elections of September 2007, Democratic Revival performed dismally, tallying 0.8% of the national vote and failed to get parliamentary representation. In May 2009 he formed the Panhellenic Macedonian Front coalition with professor Kostas Zouraris to run in the June 2009 European Parliamentary elections. The party included Greek Macedonian diaspora organisations.
