= Ellinoglosso Xenodocheio =

Greek secret society

The Ellinoglosso Xenodocheio (Greek: Ελληνόγλωσσο Ξενοδοχείο, "Hellenophone Hotel", meaning "Greek-speaking Hotel") was a secret organization established in Paris in 1814, whose purpose was to educate the Greeks and prepare the struggle against Ottoman rule over Greece. Two of its founders were the Macedonian Grigorios Zalykis and the Epirote Athanasios Tsakalov. The organization was a precursor of another organization, Filiki Eteria, of which Athanasios Tsakalov was a founding member and which succeeded in mobilizing Greeks against the Ottoman Empire culminating in the Greek War of Independence.

Among the services of the organization to the Greek movement was the shipment of 40,000 weapons to Greeks in the Peloponnese, Epirus and Macedonia. That was accomplished through the economic support of Greeks in France, one notable of them being the Paris merchant Stephanos Chatzimoschos. Αdministration and support also came from Phanariotes and prince Dimitrios Ypsilantis.

The oath of Hellenoglosson Xenodochion was signed with the acronym ΦΕΔΑ, that stands for Φιλικός Ελληνικός Δεσμός Άλυτος ("Friendly Hellenic Indissoluble Bond").

== See also ==
- Secret society
