= Kostas Zouraris =

Greek writer and political scientist

Konstantinos (Kostas) Zouraris (Greek: Κωνσταντίνος (Κώστας) Ζουράρις; born 1940 in Thessaloniki) is a Greek, from Greece's Macedonia region, political scientist and writer. He is a member of the Hellenic Parliament for the Thessaloniki A since 25 January 2015

He studied law in Thessaloniki and political science in Paris, where he was involved in the May 1968 movement . He has taught political science at Vincennes-Paris university since 1969. He is also a politician, erstwhile member of the pro-Soviet Greek communist party and of the euro-Communist party (KKE Interior), and the former editor of newspaper Makedonia.

Kostas Zouraris is a prominent speaker on the Greek position in the Macedonia naming dispute, frequently speaking on behalf of those opposing any compromise solution for the name of the neighbouring Republic of North Macedonia, that would include the word "Macedonia" or its derivatives. In May 2009 together with Stelios Papathemelis he founded the Panhellenic Macedonian Front coalition to run in the European Parliamentary elections. The party included Greek Macedonian diaspora organisations in its structure.

He was a candidate for the European Parliament with ANEL, in the elections of 25 May 2014. He was elected as a Member of Parliament with ANEL in the legislative elections of January 2015 and again in the legislative elections of September 2015. He was re-elected in the July 2019 Greek legislative election with 15.370 votes.

== Books (selection) ==
- Alpha vers (1987)
- Gelas Hellas Apophras: Stoicheia Kai Stoicheia Sten Romeeke Anchivasien (Γελάς Ελλάς Αποφράς: Στοιχεία και στοιχειά στην ρωμέηκη αγχιβασίην) (1990; reprint 1999)
- Athlia Athla Themethla (Άθλια άθλα θέμεθλα) (1997)
- L.O.K. Logoi Ovrimon Katadromon (Λ.Ο.Κ. Λόγοι οβρίμων καταδρομών) (1998)
