= Panhellenic Macedonian Front =

The Panhellenic Macedonian Front (Greek: Πανελλήνιο Μακεδονικό Μέτωπο, ΠΑ.Μ.ΜΕ.) is a political party in Greece. It was founded in May 2009 by the politician Stelios Papathemelis and professor Kostas Zouraris to run in the European Parliamentary elections of June with 22 candidates. The party is affiliated with several Greek Macedonian diaspora organizations while some of the ones that are not included in its scheme hailed the initiative.

The party's logo includes the Vergina Sun in blue background, as a parallelism to the flag of Macedonia shown above, also used in the parties political campaigning

The coalition includes the party 'Democratic Revival' that was created by Papathemelis and has run in the 2007 national elections. Zouraris is a prominent speaker of the Greek position in the Macedonia naming dispute, frequently speaking in behalf of the extreme opposition to any compromise solution for the name of the neighbouring Republic of North Macedonia that includes the word Macedonia. Both Papathemelis and Zouraris have been in the past members of the Greek parliament, each one elected with a different major parties

The party's motto is "One vote for Macedonia" and amongst its political goals was to become a member of the European Parliament so as to be the first Macedonian party of the European Parliament, with a clear Hellenic designation - a goal the party described as "to lock the name of Macedonia in Europe"

At the 2009 Greek elections for the European Parliament, the Panhellenic Macedonian Front received 1.3% of the valid votes, falling short of the required number of votes to win a seat.
