= Panagiotis Anagnostopoulos (revolutionary) =

Greek revolutionary leader

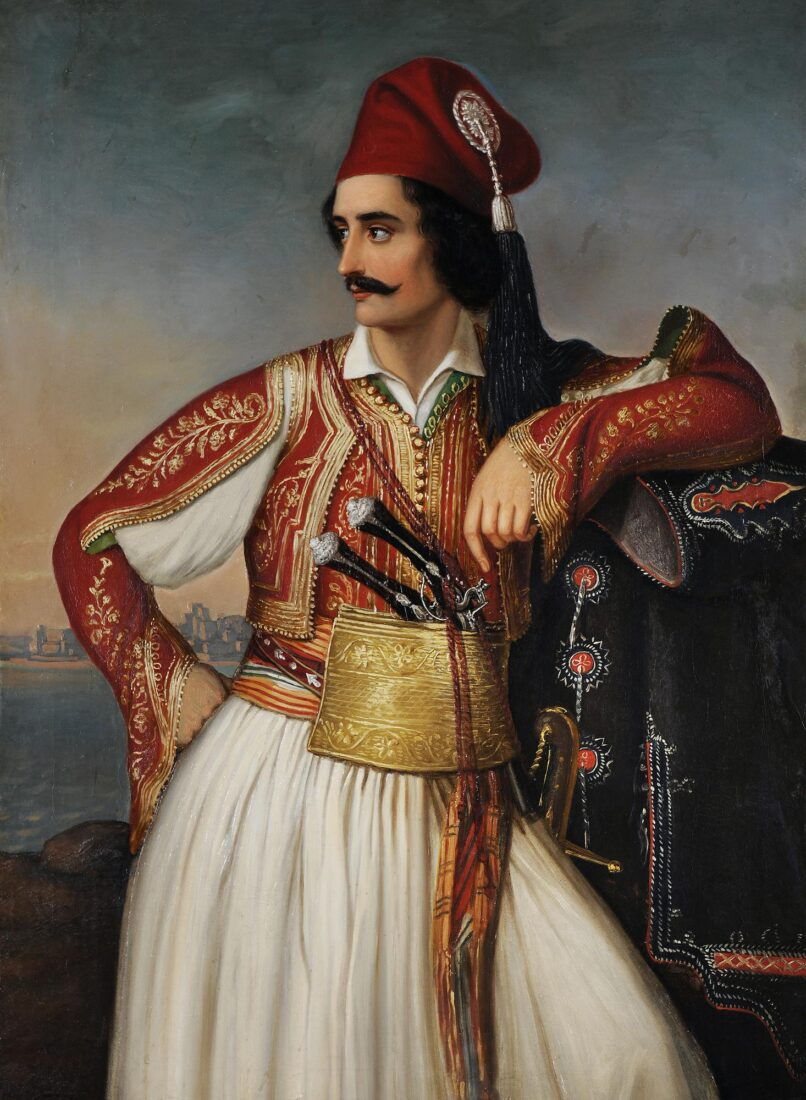
- Portrait of Anagnostopoulos, as painted by Theodoros Vryzakis
- Born: c. 1790; Andritsaina, (now Greece)
- Died: 1854; Athens, Greece
- Occupation: revolutionary leader

Panagiotis Anagnostopoulos (Greek: Παναγιώτης Αναγνωστόπουλος; c. 1790–1854) was a Greek revolutionary leader during the Greek War of Independence and a member of Filiki Eteria, the secret organization whose purpose was to overthrow the Ottoman rule of Greece and establish an independent Greek state.

== Biography ==
Panagiotis was born in Andritsaina around 1790 and was part of a poor family. In 1808, emigrated with his family to Smyrna (İzmir, Turkey) while he attended a school in Constantinople (Istanbul, Turkey). He then relocated to Odesa where he worked at the drapery shop of Athanassios Sekeris, a wealthy Greek of Constantinople. There he met Nikolaos Skoufas with whom he was initiated into Filiki Eteria.

As a member of Filiki Eteria he initiated members that would be proved valuable for it in the future. He undertook important activities in Odessa, in Vlachia, and in Italy, where he came in contact with Pisa's circle. From very early, Anagnostopoulos, clashed with Xanthos, an antagonism that would continue and in the next years, as well as with Papaflessas. His role in taking the decision for the murder of Nikolaos Galatis was important, while he had initiated Anagnostaras, Demetropoulos and Sekeris. With the start of the Greek War of Independence, Anagnostopoulos, though he was friendly to the wing of Maurokordate, penetrated in the alliance of Alexander Ypsilantis, whom he had escorted on his arrival in Peloponnese.

He fought side to side with Theodoros Kolokotronis and Anagnostaras. The negotiations about the fall of Tripolitsa, in which Anagnostopoulos participated, projected him as a great political figure. In the third National Assembly, he refused to sign the bill for British protection. In 1828 Anagnostopoulos was assigned by Kapodistrias temporary commissioner-governor (prefect of Ilieia), while later he took other political positions such as that of Euboia's administrator and governor of Achaia and Ilidos.

=== Dispute with Xanthos ===
In 1834, the historian Ioannis Philimon issued the "Historical Essay of Filiki Eteria," in which he mentioned as the first triad of the society Skoufas-Tsakalov-Anagnostopoulos. Emmanuel Xanthos, who lived abroad at the time issued "Xantho's apology" in order to answer Philimon's claim, and by extension that of Anagnostopoulos. With an article in newspaper Aeon, Philimon, in his effort to reinstate Xanthos, admitted that he was unfair to him. Anagnostopoulos, in an unpublished article, with the title "General Observations" criticized Xanthos for not being in the founding members of Filiki Eteria and accuses him of financial malpractices. The truth about who was initiated first in the Filiki Eteria is of this day unknown since the opinions of historians are divided, while the archived documents are few and sometimes unreliable to answer with certainty.

=== Death ===
Anagnostopoulos died in 1854 in Athens from cholera, brought to Greece by the English-French army occupying Piraeus during the Crimean War. In 1884, he was honoured with a central road in Kolonaki.
