= Athanasios Tsakalov =

Greek revolutionary (1790–1851)

- Αθανάσιος Τσακάλωφ
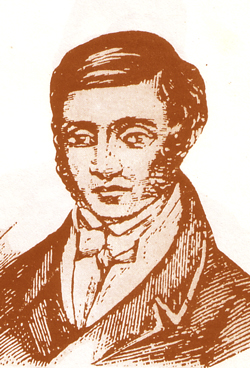
- Born: Athanasios Tsakalos; 1790; Ioannina, Ottoman Empire (now Greece)
- Died: 1851 (aged 60–61); Moscow, Russian Empire
- Known for: Founding of the Filiki Eteria and the Hellenoglosso Xenodocheio

Athanasios Tsakalov (Greek: Αθανάσιος Τσακάλωφ; 1790–1851) was a member of the Filiki Eteria ("Friendly Company"), or ("Society of Friends") a Greek patriotic organization against Ottoman rule.

== Biography ==
Tsakalov was born in 1790 in Ioannina, today's Greece (then Ottoman Empire). At a young age, he left Greece to be with his father in Russia. He studied physics in Paris, where he founded the Hellenoglosso Xenodocheio, a secret organization supporting the idea of an independent Greek state. Returning to Russia in Odessa, he became acquainted with Nikolaos Skoufas and Emmanuil Xanthos. The three men then proceeded in 1814 in Odessa to the founding of Filiki Eteria, a secret organisation to prepare the ground for Greek independence. In 1818, the three partners moved to Constantinople to further their cause. There in July, Skoufas fell ill and died leaving Tsakalov as one of the two leaders of the organization. Tsakalov was dedicated to the Greek War of Independence which started in 1821. During the war Tsakalov served as a flag lieutenant to Alexander Ypsilantis, the later leader of Filiki Eteria.

He died in 1851 in Moscow.
