= Emmanuil Xanthos =

Greek revolutionary

- Εμμανουήλ Ξανθός
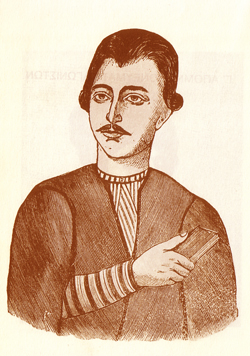
- Born: 1772; Patmos, Ottoman Empire (now Greece)
- Died: 28 November 1852 (aged 79–80); Athens, Kingdom of Greece
- Occupation: Merchant
- Known for: Founding the Filiki Eteria

Emmanuil Xanthos (Greek: Εμμανουήλ Ξάνθος; 1772 – November 28, 1852) was a Greek merchant. He was one of the founders of the Filiki Eteria ("Society of Friends"), a Greek conspiratorial organization which opposed the Ottoman Empire.

== Biography ==
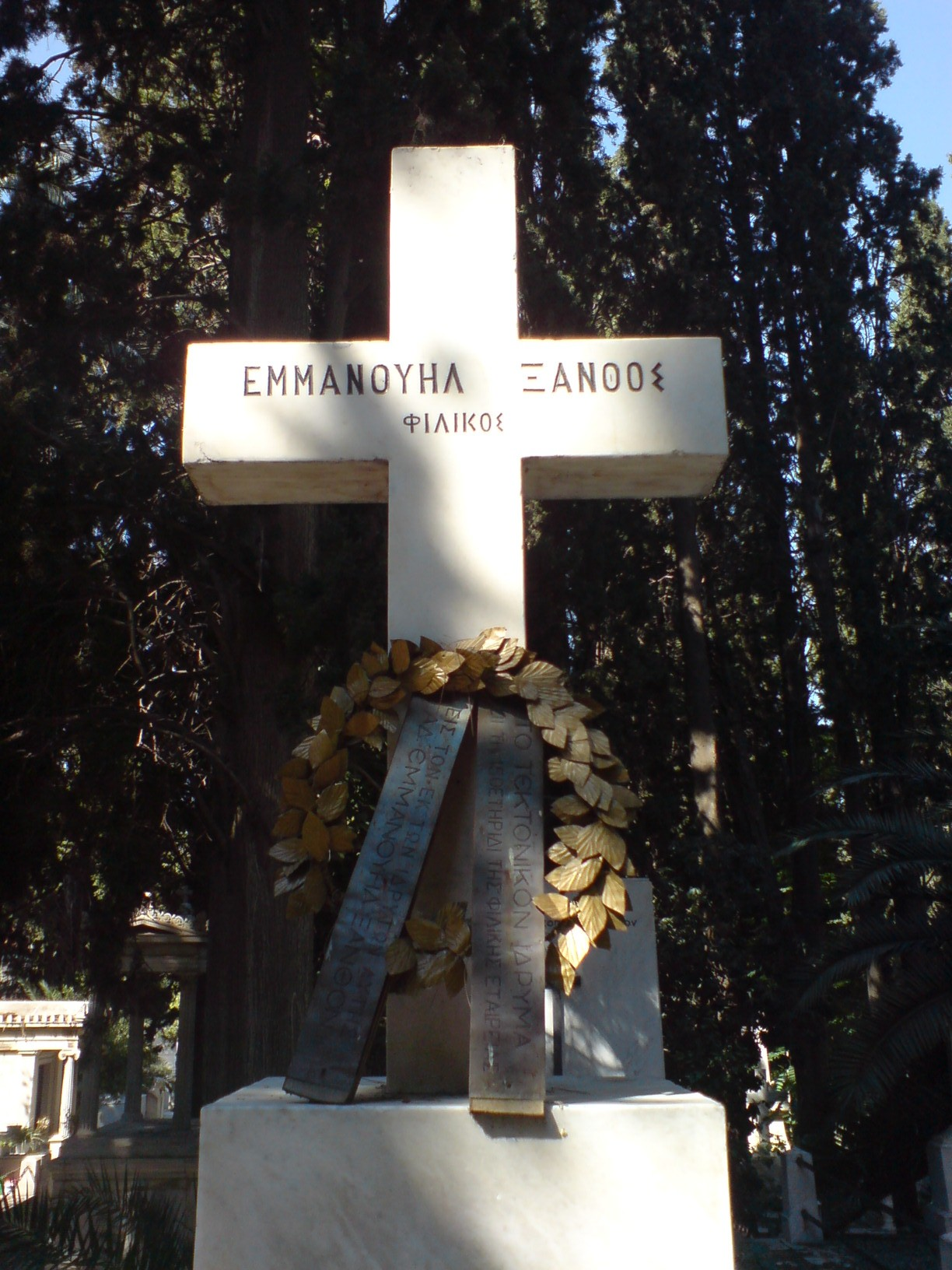
The grave of Xanthos in the First Cemetery of Athens.

Xanthos was born on the Aegean island of Patmos in Ottoman Greece. He emigrated to Italy as a youngster and was initiated in the Masonic Lodge of Lefkada ("Society of Free Builders of St. Mavra"), before finally settling in Odessa, Russia. While there, he became acquainted with Nikolaos Skoufas and Athanasios Tsakalov. The three men came up with the idea of founding a secret organization to prepare the ground for Greek independence and together they founded Filiki Eteria in 1814 in Odessa. In 1818, the three partners moved to Constantinople to further their cause. There in July, Skoufas fell ill and died leaving Xanthos as one of the two leaders of the organization. Xanthos was dedicated to the Greek War of Independence which started in 1821.

During the war Xanthos organized from Austria the escape of Alexander Ypsilantis, the later leader of Filiki Eteria, who was at the time held captive in the Mugach prison. Before his death he wrote his Memoirs (Απομνημονεύματα) which was published in 1854 and is now an important source of historical information about the inner workings of the Greek War of Independence.

Xanthos died in Athens. He was married to Sevasti Kroustala.

== Books ==
- Xanthos, Em., Memoirs for the Friendly Society (facsimile reprint of 1834 ed), Vergina (Athens, 1996)
