= Filiki Eteria =

19th-century Greek secret society opposing Ottoman rule

- Society of Friends
- Φιλική Εταιρεία
- Insignia of the Filiki Eteria
- Formation: 14 September 1814; 212 years ago
- Founder: Emmanuil Xanthos; Nikolaos Skoufas; Athanasios Tsakalov
- Founded at: Odessa, Russian Empire
- Type: Secret society Revolutionary organisation
- Headquarters: Odessa; Constantinople (from 1818)
- Region served: Ottoman Empire: Rumelia Eyalet; Danubian Principalities
- Fields: Greek nationalism
- Leader: Alexandros Ypsilantis
- Key people: Nikolaos Galatis; Alexandros Mavrokordatos; Theodoros Kolokotronis; Anthimos Gazis; Germanos III of Old Patras; Emmanouel Pappas

Filiki Eteria (Greek: Φιλικὴ Ἑταιρεία, romanized: Filikī́ Etaireía) or Society of Friends (Greek: Ἑταιρεία τῶν Φιλικῶν, romanized: Etaireía tôn Filikôn) was a secret political and revolutionary organization founded in 1814 in Odessa, whose purpose was to overthrow Ottoman rule in Greece and establish an independent Greek State. Society members were mainly young Phanariot Greeks from Constantinople and the Russian Empire, local political and military leaders from the Greek mainland and islands, as well as several Orthodox Christian leaders from other nations that were under Hellenic influence, such as Karađorđe from Serbia, and Tudor Vladimirescu from Romania. One of its leaders was the prominent Phanariote Prince Alexander Ypsilantis. The Society initiated the Greek War of Independence in the spring of 1821.

== Translations and transliterations ==
The direct translation of the word "Φιλική" is "Friendly" and the direct translation of "Ἑταιρεία" is "Society", "Company" or "Association". The common transliteration "Filiki Eteria" reflects the pronunciation of the name in modern Greek. Other possible transliterations are "Filike Etaireia", which reflects Greek orthography, and "Philike Hetaireia", which reflects the ancient Greek etymology. The word "friendly" here is meant to connote allies who work towards the same goal, not necessarily those who socialize together.

== Foundation ==
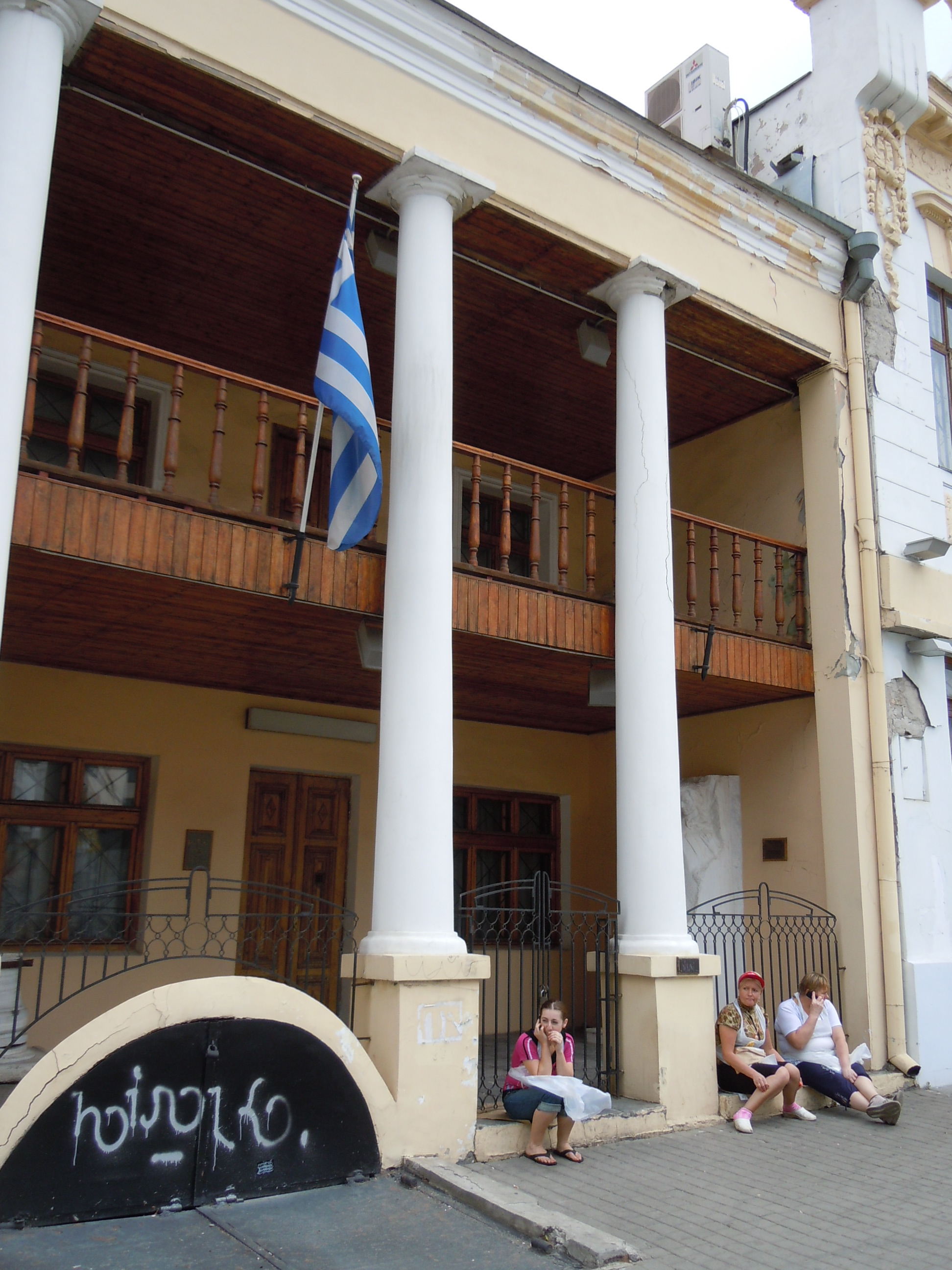
House of Filiki Eteria on Greek Square in Odessa

In the context of ardent desire for independence from Turkish occupation, and with the explicit influence of similar secret societies elsewhere in Europe, three Greeks came together in 1814 in Odessa to decide the constitution for a secret organization in freemasonic fashion. Its purpose was to unite all Greeks in an armed organization to overthrow Turkish rule. The three founders were Nikolaos Skoufas from the Arta province, Emmanuil Xanthos from Patmos and Athanasios Tsakalov from Ioannina. Soon after they initiated a fourth member, Panagiotis Anagnostopoulos from Andritsaina.

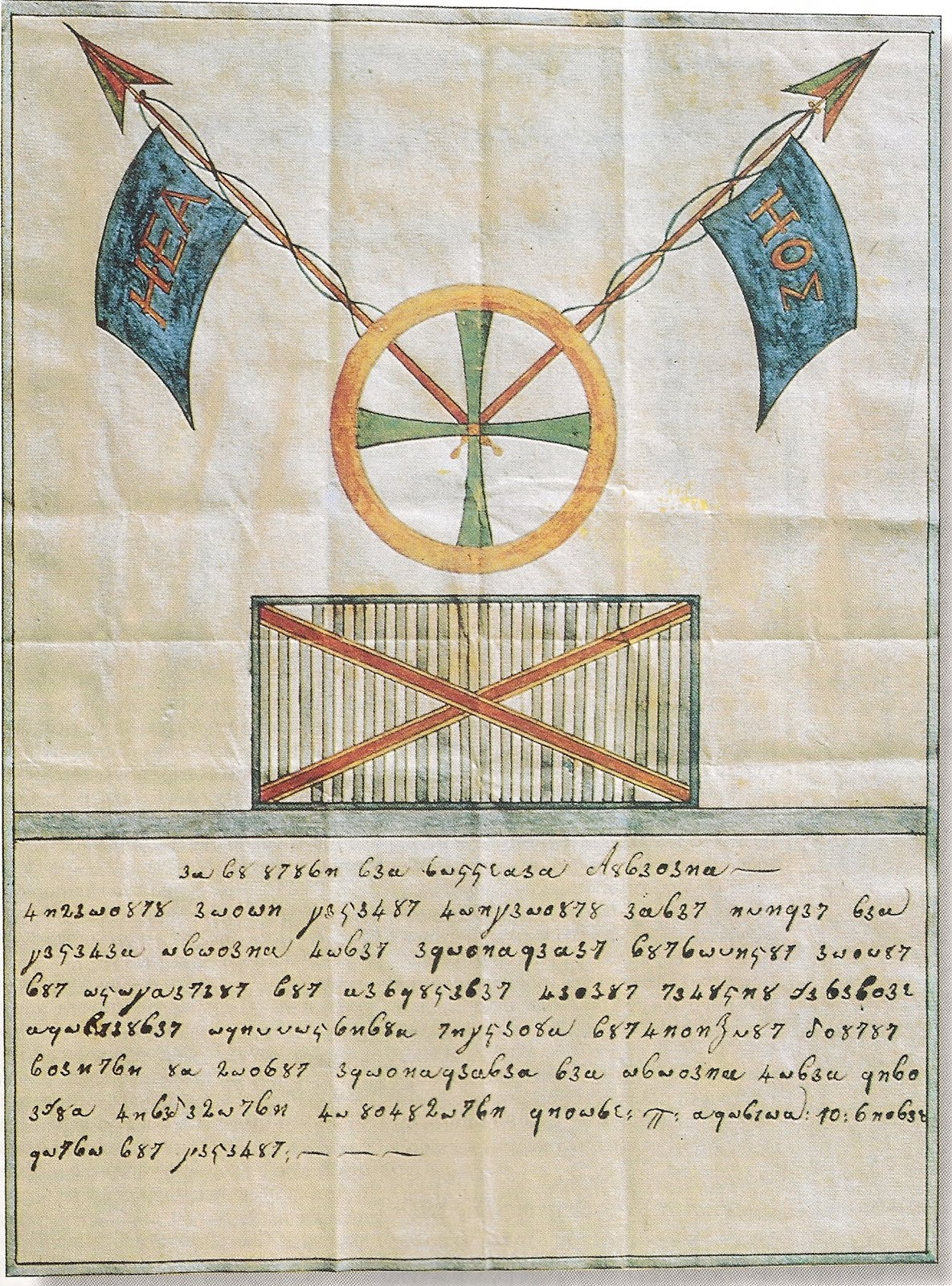
Passport of the Filiki Eteria, bearing its insignia and written in its coded alphabet.

Skoufas met with Konstantinos Rados, who was initiated into Carbonarism. Xanthos was initiated into a Freemasonic Lodge at Lefkada ("Society of Free Builders of Saint Mavra"), while Tsakalov was a founding member of the Hellenoglosso Xenodocheio (Greek: Ελληνόγλωσσο Ξενοδοχείο, meaning Greek-speaking Hotel) an earlier relative society for the liberation of Greece which had been founded in Paris and made a progress to the Greek nationalistic ideas.

At the start, between 1814 and 1816, there were roughly twenty members. During 1817, the society initiated members from the diaspora Greeks of Russia and the Danubian Principalities of Moldavia and Wallachia. The Prince of Moldavia Michael Soutzos himself, became a member. Massive initiations began only in 1818 and by early 1821, when the Society had expanded to almost all regions of Greece and throughout Greek communities abroad, the membership numbered in thousands. Among its members were tradesmen, clergy, Russian consuls, Ottoman officials from Phanar and revolutionary Serbs, most notably, the leader of the Serbian Revolution, father of the modern Serbia and founder of the Karadjordjevic dynasty Karageorge Petrovic. Members included primary instigators of the Greek revolution, notably Theodoros Kolokotronis, Odysseas Androutsos, Dimitris Plapoutas, Papaflessas and the metropolitan bishop Germanos of Patras.

== Hierarchy and initiation ==
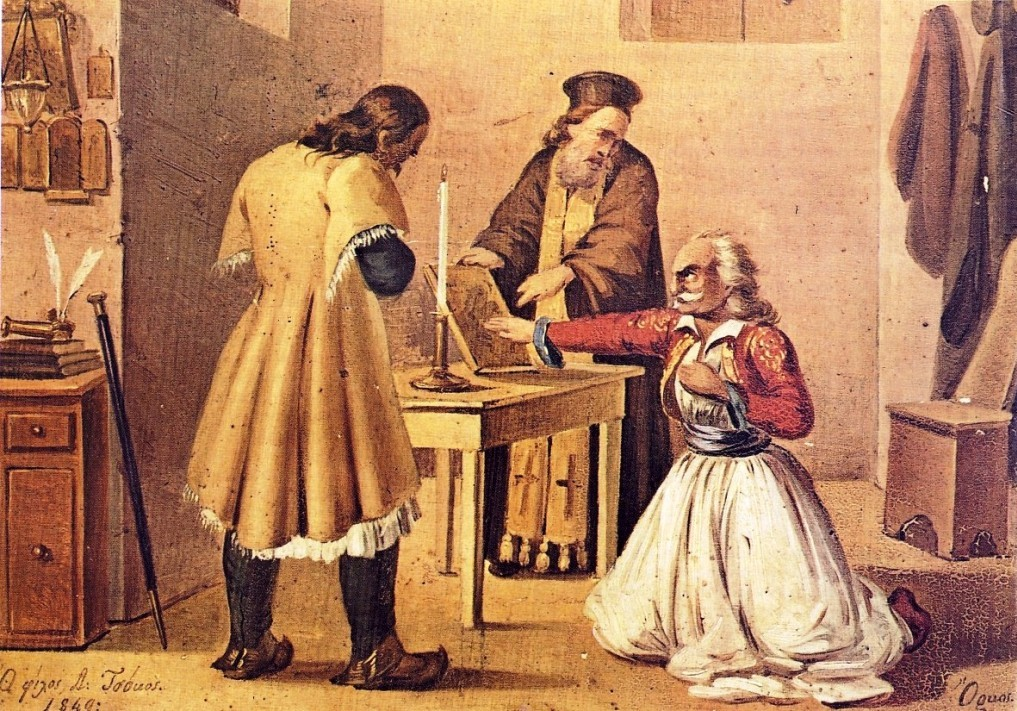
The Oath of Initiation into the Society, painting by Dionysios Tsokos, 1849.

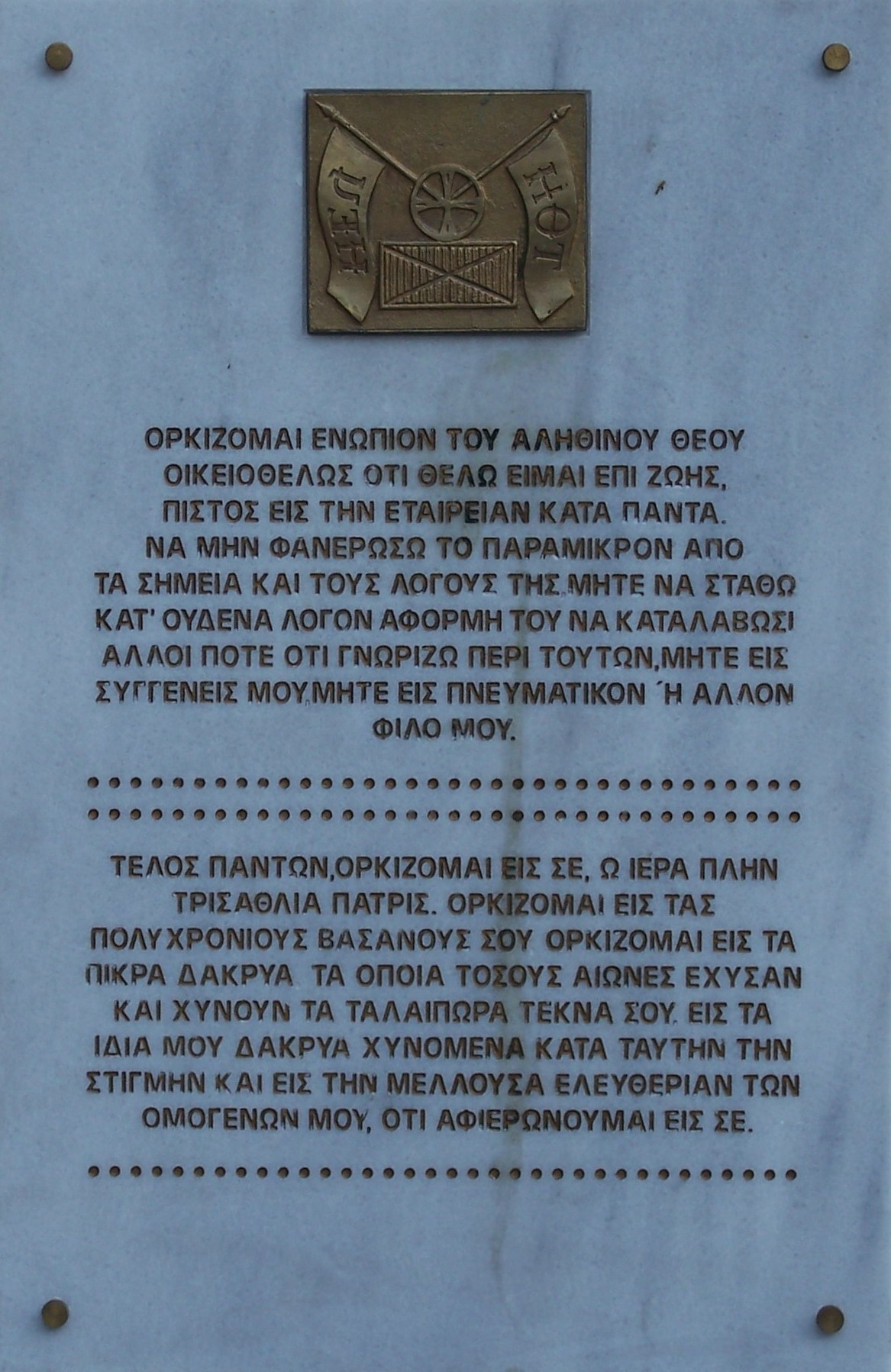
The Great Oath of the Filiki Eteria, written on a monument at Kolonaki, Athens.

Filiki Eteria was strongly influenced by Carbonarism and Freemasonry. The team of leaders made and spread its decisions, saying that they transmitted the commands of an "Invisible Authority" (Αόρατος Αρχή), who was thought to be one or more strong persons, so that from the start it was shrouded in mystery, secrecy and glamour. It was generally believed that a lot of important personalities were members, not only eminent Greeks, but also notable foreigners such as the Tsar of Russia Alexander I. The reality was that initially, the Invisible Authority comprised only the three founders. From 1815 until 1818, five more were added to the Invisible Authority, and after the death of Skoufas three more. In 1818, the Invisible Authority was renamed to the "Authority of the Twelve Apostles" and each Apostle shouldered the responsibility of a separate region.

The organisational structure was pyramid-like, with the "Invisible Authority" coordinating from the top. No one knew or had the right to ask who created the organisation. Commands were carried out unquestioningly and members did not have the right to make decisions. Members of the society came together in what was called a "Temple" with four levels of initiation: a) Brothers (Αδελφοποίητοι) or Vlamides (Βλάμηδες), b) the Recommended (Συστημένοι), c) the Priests (Ιερείς) and d) the Shepherds (Ποιμένες). The Priests were charged with the duty of initiation.

I swear in the name of truth and justice, before the Supreme Being, to guard, by sacrificing my own life, and suffering the hardest toils, the mystery, which shall be explained to me and that I shall respond with the truth whatever I am asked.

— The Oath of Initiation in to the Filiki

When the Priest approached a new member, it was first to make sure of his patriotism and catechize him in the aims of the society; the last stage was to put him under the lengthy principal oath, called the Great Oath (Μέγας Όρκος). Much of the essence of it was contained in its conclusion:

Last of all, I swear by Thee, my sacred and suffering Country,— I swear by thy long-endured tortures,— I swear by the bitter tears which for so many centuries have been shed by thy unhappy children, by my own tears which I am pouring forth at this very moment,— I swear by the future liberty of my countrymen, that I consecrate myself wholly to thee; that hence forward thou shall be the cause and object of my thoughts, thy name the guide of my actions, and thy happiness the recompense of my labours.

— Conclusion of the Great Oath of the Filiki

When the above was administered the Priest then uttered the words of acceptance of the novice as a new member:

Before the face of the invisible and omnipresent true God, who in his essence is just, the avenger of transgression, the chastizer of evil, by the laws of the Eteria Filiki, and by the authority with which its powerful priests have intrusted me, I receive you, as I was myself received, into the bosom of the Eteria.

— words of acceptance into Filiki

Afterwards the initiated were considered neophyte members of the society, with all the rights and obligations of this rank. The Priest immediately had the obligation to reveal all the marks of recognition between the Vlamides or Brothers. Vlamides and Recommended were unaware of the revolutionary aims of the organisation. They only knew that there existed a society that tried hard for the general good of the nation, which included in its ranks important personalities. This myth was propagated deliberately in order to stimulate the morale of members and also to make proselytism easier.

=== Members ===
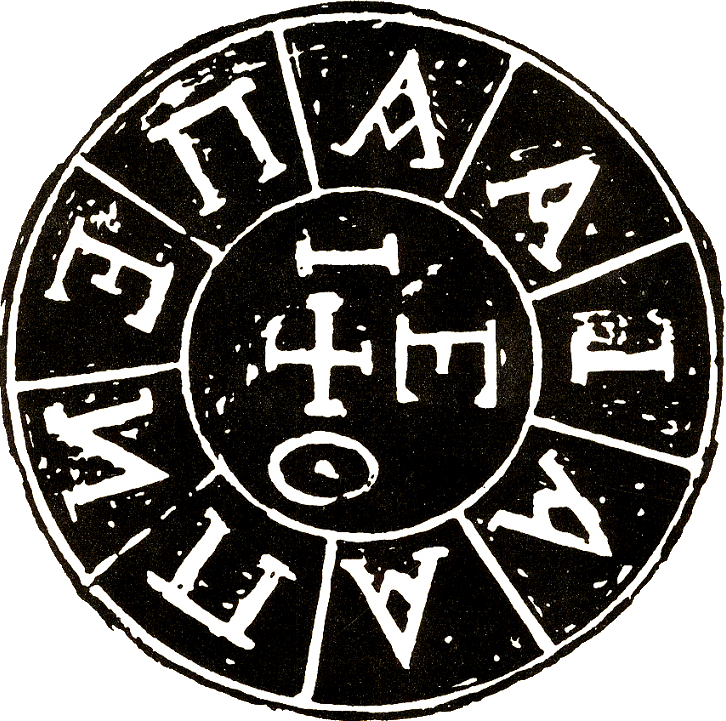
A stamp of Filiki Eteria. Contains codified the initial letters of the names of the most important members, according to Xanthos Memoirs.

Members in the secret society divided to three parts: a) Etairoi (society members), who had important duties, b) Apostles (advocates), who also had important duties, and c) all other members.

Etairoi	Apostles
1. Nikolaos Skoufas; 2. Athanasios Tsakalov; 3. Emmanuil Xanthos; 4. Antonios Komizopoulos; 5. Gregorios Flessas; 6. Panagiotis Anagnostopoulos; 7. Panagiotis Sekeris; 8. Anthimos Gazis; 9. Nikolaos Patsimadis; 10. Athanasios Sekeris; 11. Georgios Leventis; 12. Alexandros Ypsilantis	1. Anagnostaras; 2. Christoforos Perraivos^{1}; 3. Yiannis Pharmakis; 4. Elias Chrysospathis; 5. Kamarinós Kyriakós †; 6. Aristeidis Pappas; 7. Nikolaos Ypatros; 8. Demetrios Themelis; 9. Antonios Pelopidas; 10. Nikolaos Galatis †^{2}; 11. Charalambos Mattis; 12. Georgios Sekeris; 13. Constantinos Pentedekas; 14. Athanasios Xodilos; 15. Gavriil Katakazi^{3}
^{1} In source referenced as Christodoulos Perraivos (p. 44).^{2} In source referenced as N. Galatis (p. 44) and Galanis (p. 45).^{3} In source referended as Georgios Katakazis (p. 44). † Members who were killed as traitors (p. 45).
Source: List of 12 Etairoi and 15 Apostles, sorted by their initiation date.

The following is a list of members of the Filiki Eteria in order of most initiations which they conducted:

Initiations	Name	Profession	Origin	Initiator	Place of Initiation	Year
49	Anagnostaras	Soldier	Peloponnese	N. Skoufas	Odessa	1817
36	G. Dikaios	Clergyman	Peloponnese	P. Anagnostopoulos	Constantinople	1818
31	N. Kalivas	Doctor	Zakynthos	I. Asimakopoulos	Zakynthos	1819
30	A. Pappas	Teacher	Thessaly	—	Italy	1818
25	K. Pentedekas	Merchant	Epirus	N. Galatis	Moscow	1816
23	S. Hahamakis	Merchant	Constantinople	N. Skoufas	Odessa	1817
23	A. Stratigopoulos	Merchant	Smyrna	—	Odessa	1820
18	P. Anagnostopoulos	Merchant	Peloponnese	N. Skoufas	Odessa	1815
18	N. Paboukis	Teacher	Peloponnese	Anagnostaras	Hydra	1818
17	Α. Tsounis	Merchant	Peloponnese	—	Odessa	1818
17	Ε. Chrysospathis	Soldier	Peloponnese	N. Skoufas	Odessa	1817
16	N. Skoufas	Merchant	Epirus	—	Odessa	1814
15	P. Arvalis	Merchant	Peloponnese	—	Constantinople	1818
13	P. Athanasiou	Merchant	Peloponnese	A. Tsakalof	Constantinople	1818
12	G. Gatsos	Merchant	Epirus	Α. Komizopoulos	Moscow	1817
12	A. Pelopidas	Merchant	Epirus	G. Dikaios	Constantinople	1818
12	S. Arvanitachi	Merchant	Zakynthos	N. Mouzakis	Galați	1820
11	D. Paboukis	Clergyman	Peloponnese	Ν. Paboukis	Peloponnese	1819
11	Th. Kolokotronis	Soldier	Peloponnese	Anagnostaras	Zakynthos	1818
10	D. Pelopidas	Merchant	Peloponnese	P. Naoum	Odessa	1820
10	I. Klados	Doctor	Kythira	P. Naoum	Hydra	1820

== Change of leadership ==
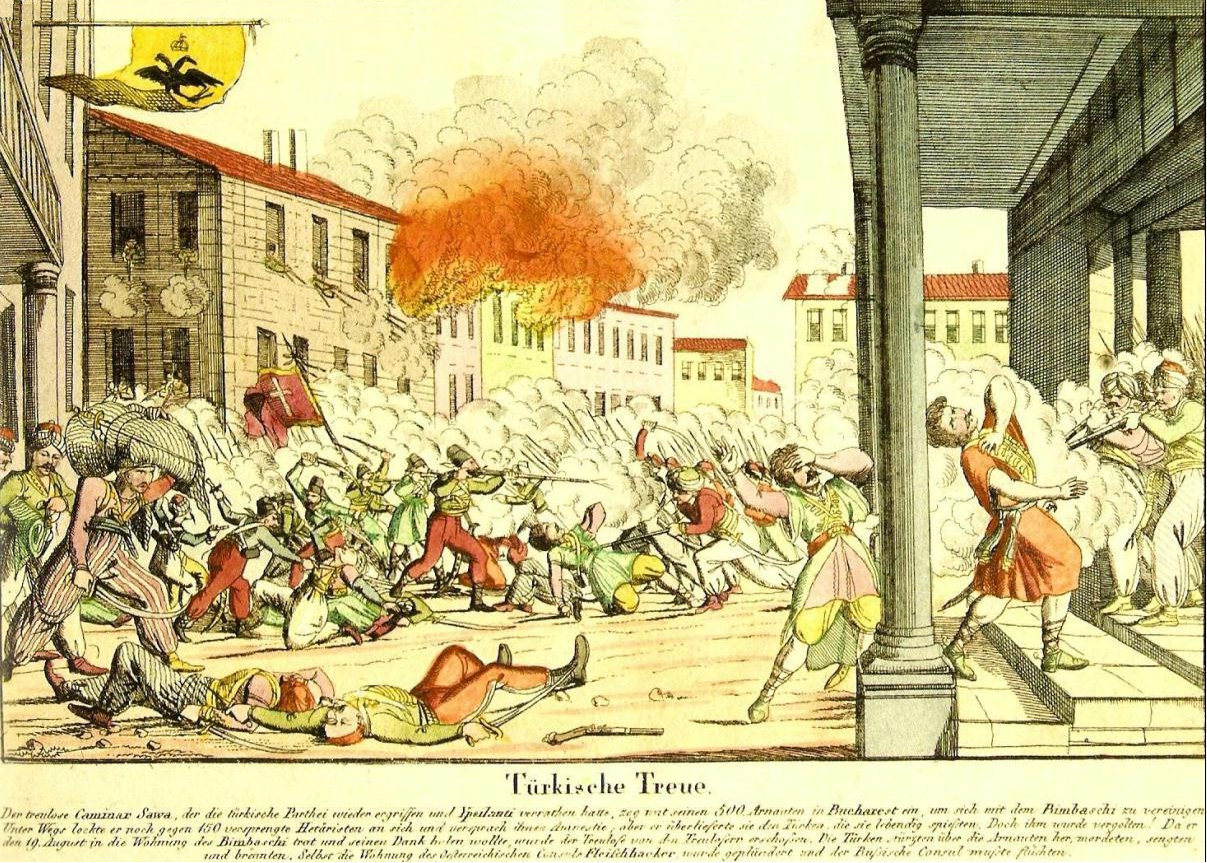
Fighting in Bucharest (1821)

In 1818, the seat of Filiki Eteria had migrated from Odessa to Constantinople, and Skoufas' death had been a serious loss. The remaining founders attempted to find a major personality to take over the reins, one who would add prestige and fresh impetus to the society. In early 1818, they had a meeting with Ioannis Kapodistrias, who not only refused, but later wrote that he considered Filiki Eteria guilty for the havoc that was foreboded in Greece.

Alexandros Ypsilantis was contacted and asked to assume leadership of Filiki Eteria, which he did in April 1820. He began active preparations for a revolt and with the setting up of a military unit for the purpose that he named the Sacred Band. Various proposals were made for the location regarding the break out of the revolution. One of them was to be in Constantinople, the heart of the empire, that was the long-term target of the revolutionaries. Finally the decision that was taken was to start from the Peloponnese (Morea), and the Danubian Principalities for a feint at the same time. The society especially wanted to also take advantage of the involvement of significant Ottoman forces, including the pasha of the Moreas, against Ali Pasha of Ioannina.

== See also ==
- Ellinoglosso Xenodocheio
- Filomousos Eteria
- Marigo Zarafopoula
