= Nikolaos Skoufas =

Greek revolutionary

- Νικόλαος Σκουφάς
- Born: 1779; Kompoti, Ottoman Empire (now Greece)
- Died: 31 July 1818 (aged 38–39); Constantinople, Ottoman Empire (now Istanbul, Turkey)
- Occupations: Apothecary; Secretary; Hatter; Merchant
- Known for: Founding of Filiki Eteria

Nikolaos Skoufas (Greek: Νικόλαος Σκουφάς; 1779 – July 31, 1818) was a founding member of the Filiki Eteria ("Society of Friends"), a Greek conspiratorial organization against the Ottoman Empire that prepared the Greek War of Independence.

== Biography ==
Skoufas was born in 1779 in Kompoti, near Arta. His father's surname was "Koumparos". He worked at various times as an apothecary, a commercial secretary and a hatter (from which he took the name Skoufas). Skoufas left as a merchant for the Russian Empire for business purposes. While there, he became acquainted with Athanasios Tsakalov and Emmanuil Xanthos. The three men came up with the idea of founding a secret organisation to prepare the ground for Greek independence. So, the Filiki Eteria was founded in 1814 in Odessa. Skoufas dedicated the rest of his life to the cause. For this purpose he went to Moscow but his ideas did not meet with the approval of many people of the local Greek community.

In 1818, the three partners moved to Constantinople to further their cause, but in July of that same year Skoufas fell ill and died.
