= Vinnytsia =

City and administrative center of Vinnytsia Oblast, Ukraine

Vinnytsia Вінниця
- City
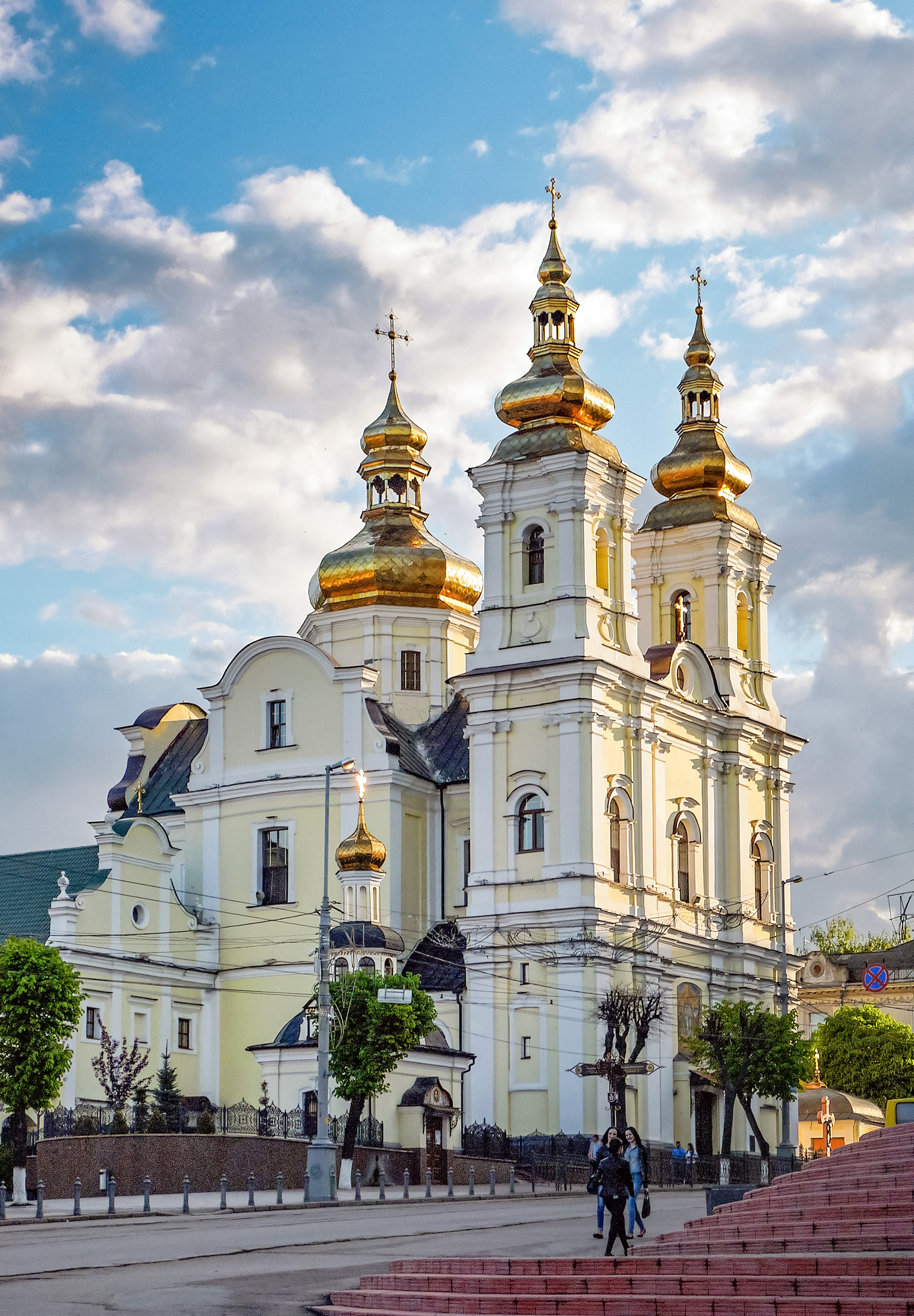
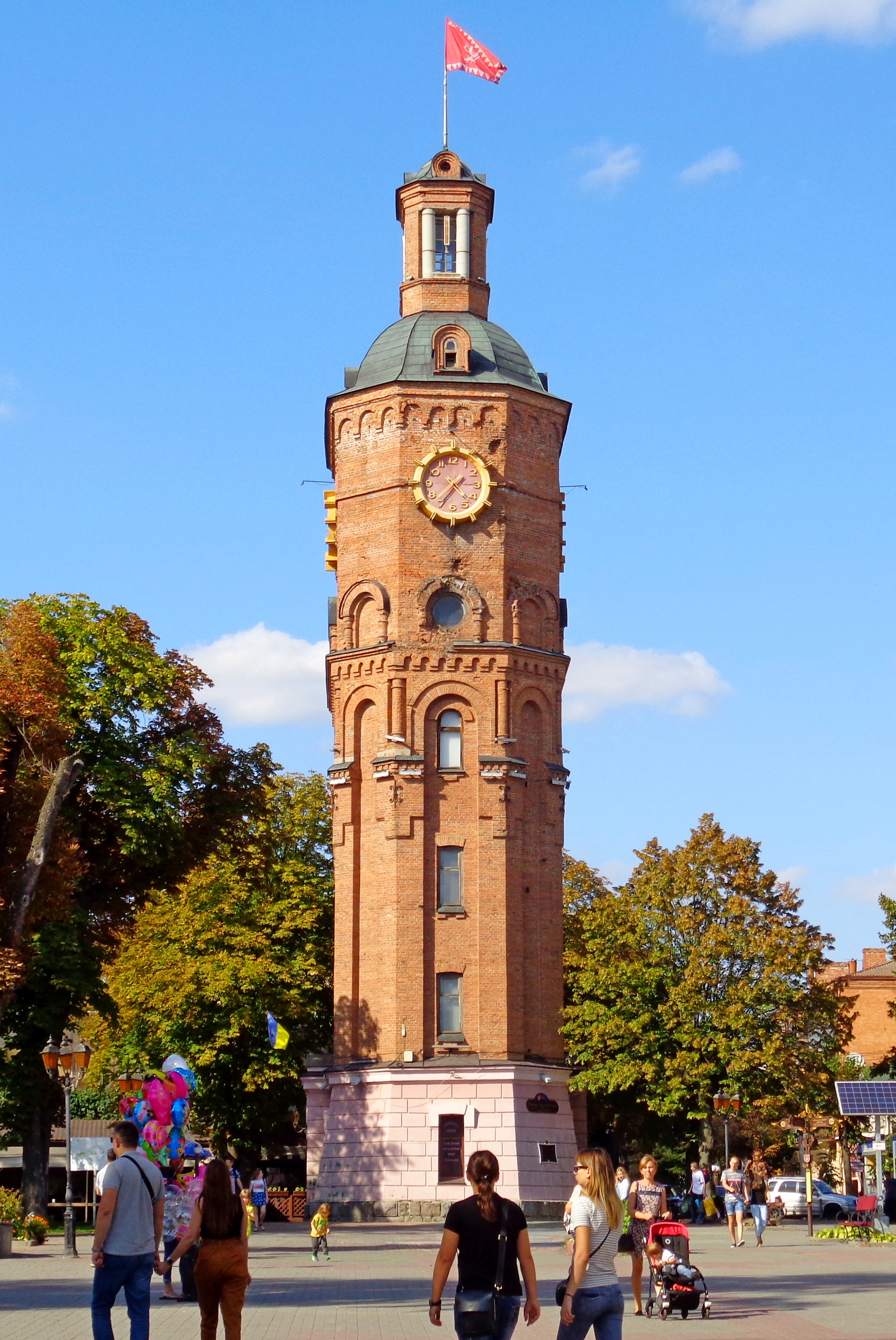
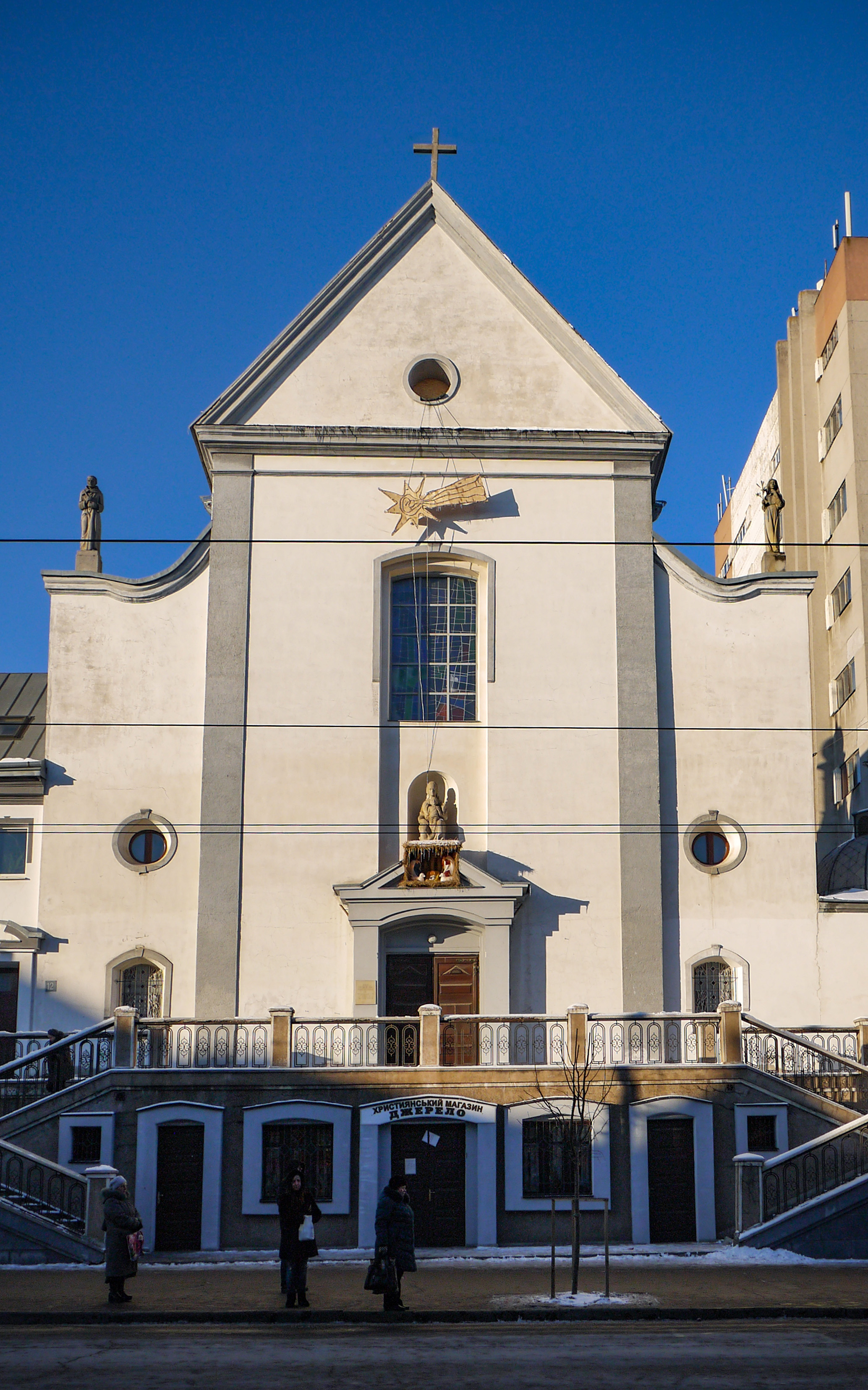
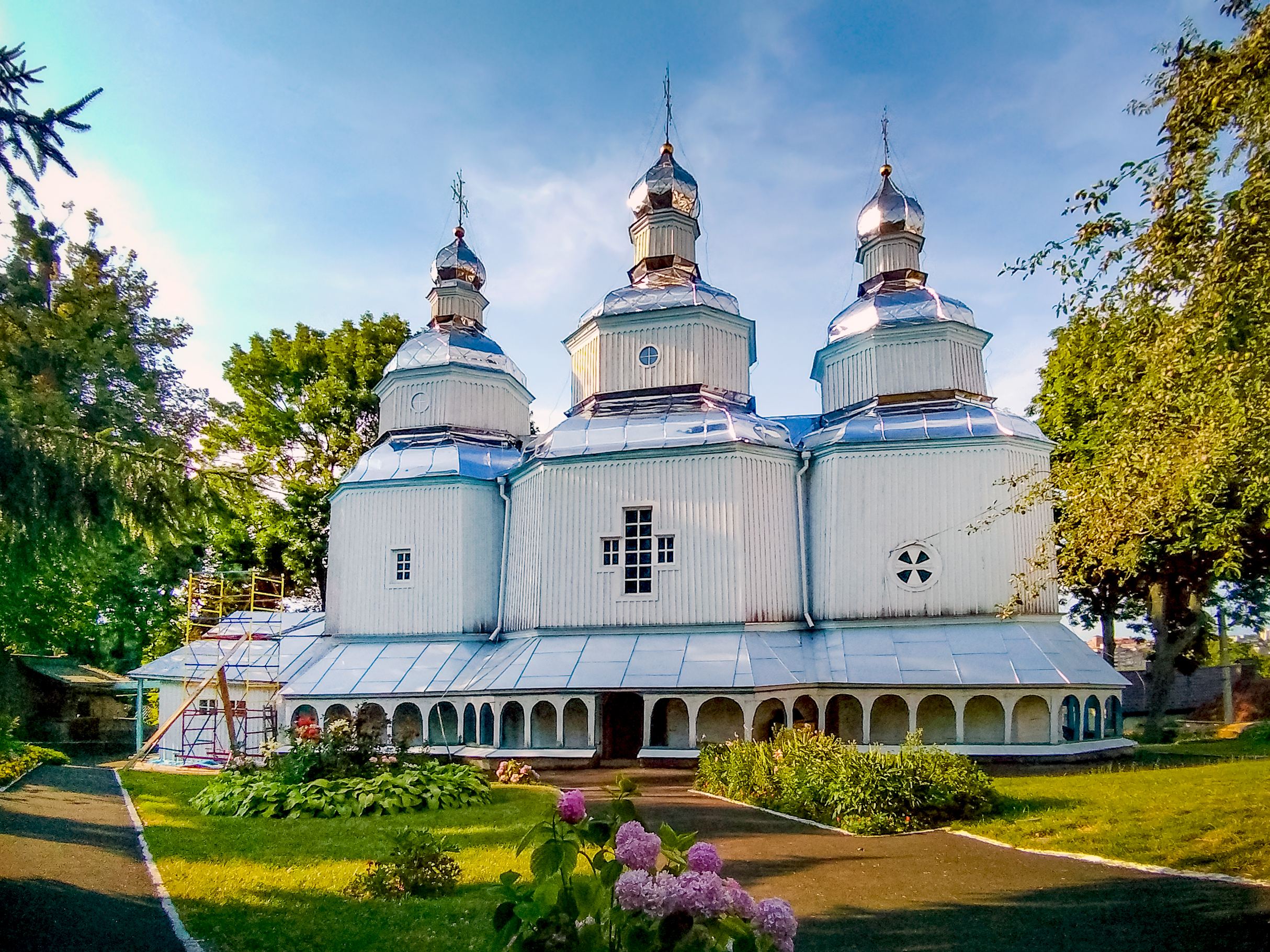
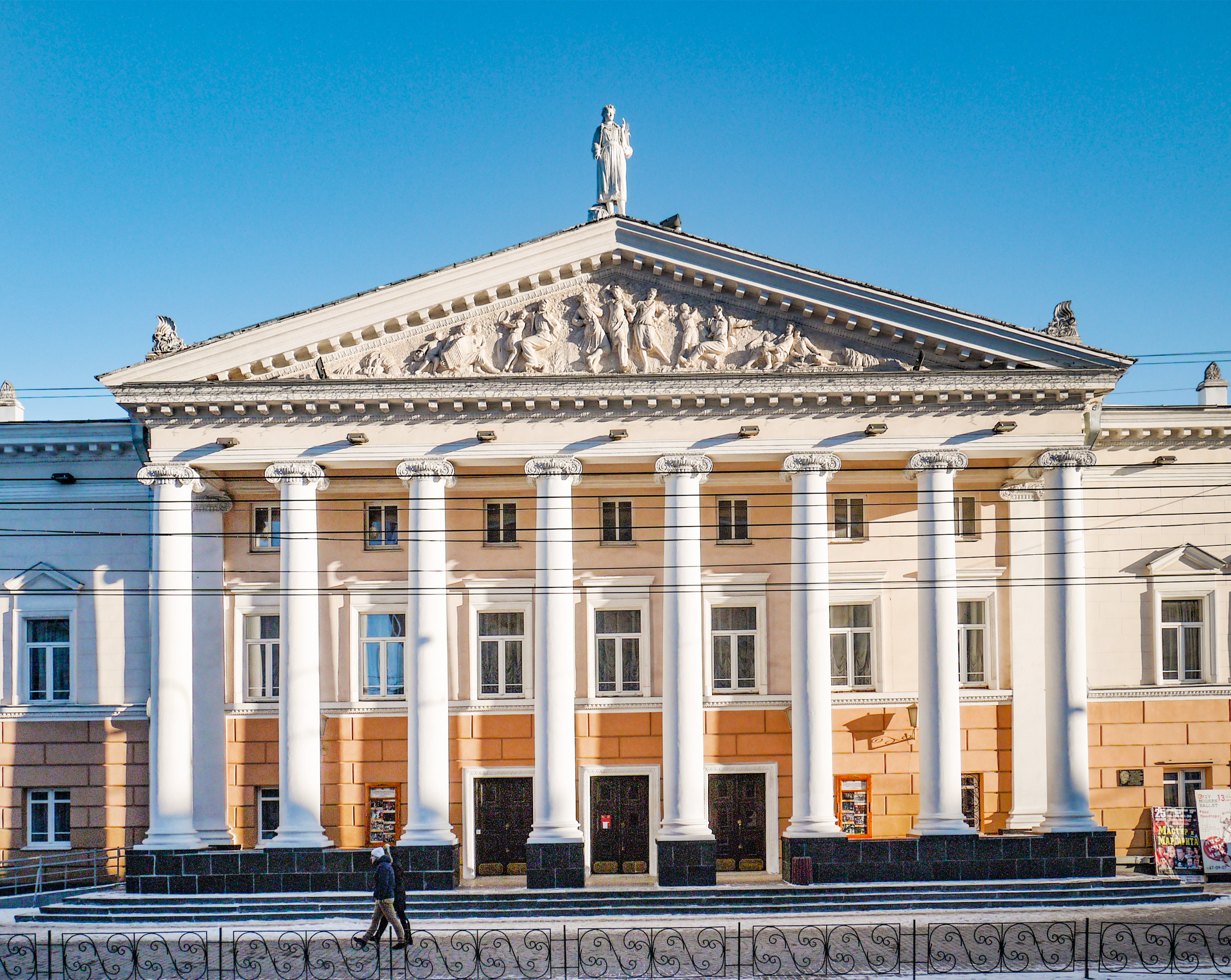
- View of the city Transfiguration Cathedral Water tower Capuchin Church Saint Nicholas Church Academic Music and Drama Theater

- Flag Coat of arms
- Nickname: Pearl of Podilia
- Location within Vinnytsia Oblast Location within Ukraine
- Coordinates: 49°14′N 28°29′E
- Country: Ukraine
- Oblast: Vinnytsia Oblast
- Raion: Vinnytsia Raion
- Hromada: Vinnytsia urban hromada
- Founded: 1363

Government
  - Mayor: Serhiy Morhunov (Ukrainian Strategy of Groysman)

Area
  - City: 140 km^{2} (54 sq mi)

Population (2026)
  - City: 370,814
  - Density: 3,290/km^{2} (8,500/sq mi)
  - Metro: 650,439
- Time zones: UTC+2
- UTC+3
- Postal code: 21000-
- Area code: +380 432
- Sister cities: Birmingham, Kielce, Peterborough, Bursa, Panevėžys, Bat Yam, Karlsruhe, Nancy
- Website: vmr.gov.ua/en

Vinnytsia (/ˈvɪnɪts(j)ə, ˈviːn-/ VIN-it-s(y)ə, VEEN-; Ukrainian: Вінниця, IPA: [ˈwinːɪtsʲɐ]) is a city in west-central Ukraine, located on the banks of the Southern Bug. It serves as the administrative center of Vinnytsia Oblast in Ukraine. It is the largest city in the historic region of Podillia. It also serves as the administrative center of Vinnytsia Raion, one of the six raions of Vinnytsia Oblast. It has a population of 370,814 (as of July 2026, Vinnytsia urban hromada).

The city's roots date back to the Middle Ages. It was under Lithuanian and Polish control for centuries. From 1653 to 1667, Vinnytsia was a regimental city of the Hetman state, and in 1793, it was ceded to the Russian Empire. During the 1930s and early 1940s, the city was the site of massacres, first during Stalin's purges and then during the Holocaust in Ukraine and the Nazi occupation. A Cold War–era airbase was located near the city. Currently, Vinnytsia is developing as one of the most comfortable cities for life in independent Ukraine.

== Name ==
Ukrainian transcriptions

- National, BGN/PCGN: Vinnytsia
- ALA-LC: Vinnytsi͡a
- Scholarly: Vinnycja
- DSTU 9112:2021: Vinnycja

The name of Vinnytsia appeared for the first time in 1363. It is assumed that the name is derived from the Proto-Slavic word "*věno" (вѣно), meaning "a bride price." This name can be explained by the fact that Vinnytsia and the surrounding land were captured by Lithuanian Duke Algirdas in the 14th century, and then, they were given to his nephews.

In addition to the Ukrainian Вінниця (Vinnytsia), in other languages of the region, the name of the city is Russian: Винница, romanized: Vinnitsa, Polish: Winnica, Lithuanian: Vinica, German: Winniza, Romanian: Vinița and Yiddish: וויניצע, romanized: Vinitse. English sources used the Russian-derived Vinnitsa from the early 19th century until the 1990s and Winnica or Winnicza (from Polish) before that, reflecting the ultimate political authorities of those respective eras. According to the official transcription of DSTU 9112:2021 (1 April 2022), Вінниця should be rendered as Vinnycja in the Ukrainian Latin alphabet.

== Geography ==
=== Location ===
Vinnytsia is located about 260 km (160 mi) southwest of the Ukrainian capital, Kyiv, 429 km (267 mi) north-northwest of the Black Sea port city of Odesa, and 369 km (229 mi) east of Lviv.

It is the administrative center of Vinnytsia Oblast (province), as well as the administrative center of the surrounding Vinnytsia Raion within the oblast. The city itself is directly subordinated to the oblast.

=== Climate ===
The city has a warm-summer humid continental climate (Köppen: Dfb).

A long-lasting warm summer with a sufficient quantity of moisture and a comparatively short winter is characteristic of Vinnytsia. The average temperature in January is −5.8 °C (21.6 °F) and 18.3 °C (64.9 °F) in July. The average annual precipitation is 638 mm (25 in).

Over the course of a year there are around 6–9 days when snowstorms occur, 37–60 days when mists occur during the cold period, and 3–5 days when thunderstorms with hail occur.

Climate data for Vinnytsia, Ukraine (1991–2020, extremes 1900–present)
Month	Jan	Feb	Mar	Apr	May	Jun	Jul	Aug	Sep	Oct	Nov	Dec	Year
Record high °C (°F)	15.3 (59.5)	17.3 (63.1)	26.7 (80.1)	29.4 (84.9)	32.2 (90.0)	36.2 (97.2)	39.2 (102.6)	38.2 (100.8)	36.5 (97.7)	28.6 (83.5)	19.9 (67.8)	15.4 (59.7)	39.2 (102.6)
Mean daily maximum °C (°F)	−1.4 (29.5)	0.2 (32.4)	6.0 (42.8)	14.3 (57.7)	20.1 (68.2)	23.6 (74.5)	25.6 (78.1)	25.2 (77.4)	19.4 (66.9)	12.7 (54.9)	5.4 (41.7)	0.0 (32.0)	12.6 (54.7)
Daily mean °C (°F)	−3.8 (25.2)	−2.7 (27.1)	1.9 (35.4)	9.1 (48.4)	14.7 (58.5)	18.2 (64.8)	20.0 (68.0)	19.4 (66.9)	14.1 (57.4)	8.1 (46.6)	2.5 (36.5)	−2.3 (27.9)	8.3 (46.9)
Mean daily minimum °C (°F)	−6.2 (20.8)	−5.4 (22.3)	−1.6 (29.1)	4.3 (39.7)	9.3 (48.7)	13.1 (55.6)	14.8 (58.6)	13.9 (57.0)	9.3 (48.7)	4.3 (39.7)	0.0 (32.0)	−4.5 (23.9)	4.3 (39.7)
Record low °C (°F)	−35.5 (−31.9)	−33.6 (−28.5)	−24.2 (−11.6)	−12.7 (9.1)	−2.8 (27.0)	2.5 (36.5)	5.2 (41.4)	1.5 (34.7)	−4.5 (23.9)	−11.4 (11.5)	−24.6 (−12.3)	−27.2 (−17.0)	−35.5 (−31.9)
Average precipitation mm (inches)	29 (1.1)	31 (1.2)	32 (1.3)	40 (1.6)	54 (2.1)	87 (3.4)	73 (2.9)	54 (2.1)	61 (2.4)	35 (1.4)	35 (1.4)	35 (1.4)	566 (22.3)
Average extreme snow depth cm (inches)	12 (4.7)	12 (4.7)	9 (3.5)	0 (0)	0 (0)	0 (0)	0 (0)	0 (0)	0 (0)	0 (0)	1 (0.4)	6 (2.4)	12 (4.7)
Average rainy days	7	6	10	13	14	15	15	10	12	11	12	9	134
Average snowy days	16	16	11	3	0.1	0	0	0	0	1	8	14	69
Average relative humidity (%)	85.9	83.4	76.4	65.2	65.3	69.4	70.3	68.1	73.4	79.4	86.2	87.2	75.9
Mean monthly sunshine hours	53	73	135	198	261	287	293	278	192	135	57	44	2,006
Source 1: Pogoda.ru.net
Source 2: NOAA (humidity and sun 1991–2020)

=== Ecology and climate change ===
On 1 July 2026, Vinnytsia City Council announced the Vinnytsia Green Deal by signing the Declaration and approving the roadmap of measures for the implementation of its principles and approaches within the community.

== History ==
=== Early history ===
Historical affiliations

Grand Duchy of Lithuania 1363–1569
Polish–Lithuanian Commonwealth 1569–1649
Cossack Hetmanate 1649–1667
Polish–Lithuanian Commonwealth 1667–1672
Ottoman Empire 1672–1699
Polish–Lithuanian Commonwealth 1699–1793
Russian Empire 1793–1917
(Russia) Russian Republic 1917
Ukrainian People's Republic 1917–1918
Ukrainian State 1918
Ukrainian People's Republic 1918–1919
(Ukrainian Soviet Socialist Republic) Soviet Ukraine 1919
Ukrainian People's Republic 1919–1920
(Ukrainian Soviet Socialist Republic) Soviet Ukraine 1920–1922
Soviet Union 1922–1941
Nazi Germany 1941–1944 (occupation)
Soviet Union 1944–1991
Ukraine 1991–present

Vinnytsia, known in Polish as Winnica, has been an important trade and political center since the fourteenth century, when Fyodor Koriatovych, the nephew of the Lithuanian Duke Algirdas, built a fortress (1363) against Tatar raiders on the banks of the Southern Bug. The original settlement was built and populated by Aleksander Hrehorovicz Jelec, a hetman under Lithuanian Prince Švitrigaila. Aleksander Jelec built the fort, which he commanded as starosta afterwards.

In the 15th century, Lithuanian Grand Duke Alexander Jagiellon granted Vinnytsia Magdeburg city rights. In 1566, it became part of the Bracław Voivodeship. Between 1569 and 1793 the town was a part of Poland. In 1648, Vinnytsia found itself at the epicenter of the Cossack uprisings led by Bohdan Khmelnytsky. In February 1651, during the defense of the city, Ivan Bohun's Cossack regiment defeated a 20,000-strong Polish army. Vinnytsia was part of the Hetman state until 1667, and during 1672-1699 was a part of the Ottoman Empire. Under Polish rule, Vinnytsia was a royal city. On 18 March 1783, Antoni Protazy Potocki opened the Polish Trade Company in Vinnytsia. The 1st Infantry Regiment of the Polish Crown Army was stationed in the city in 1788 before it was relocated to Piotrków Trybunalski.

=== Late modern period ===
After the Second Partition of Poland in 1793 the Russian Empire annexed the city and the region. Russia moved to expunge the Roman Catholic religion. Catholic churches in the city, including what is currently the Transfiguration Cathedral, were converted to Russian Orthodox churches.

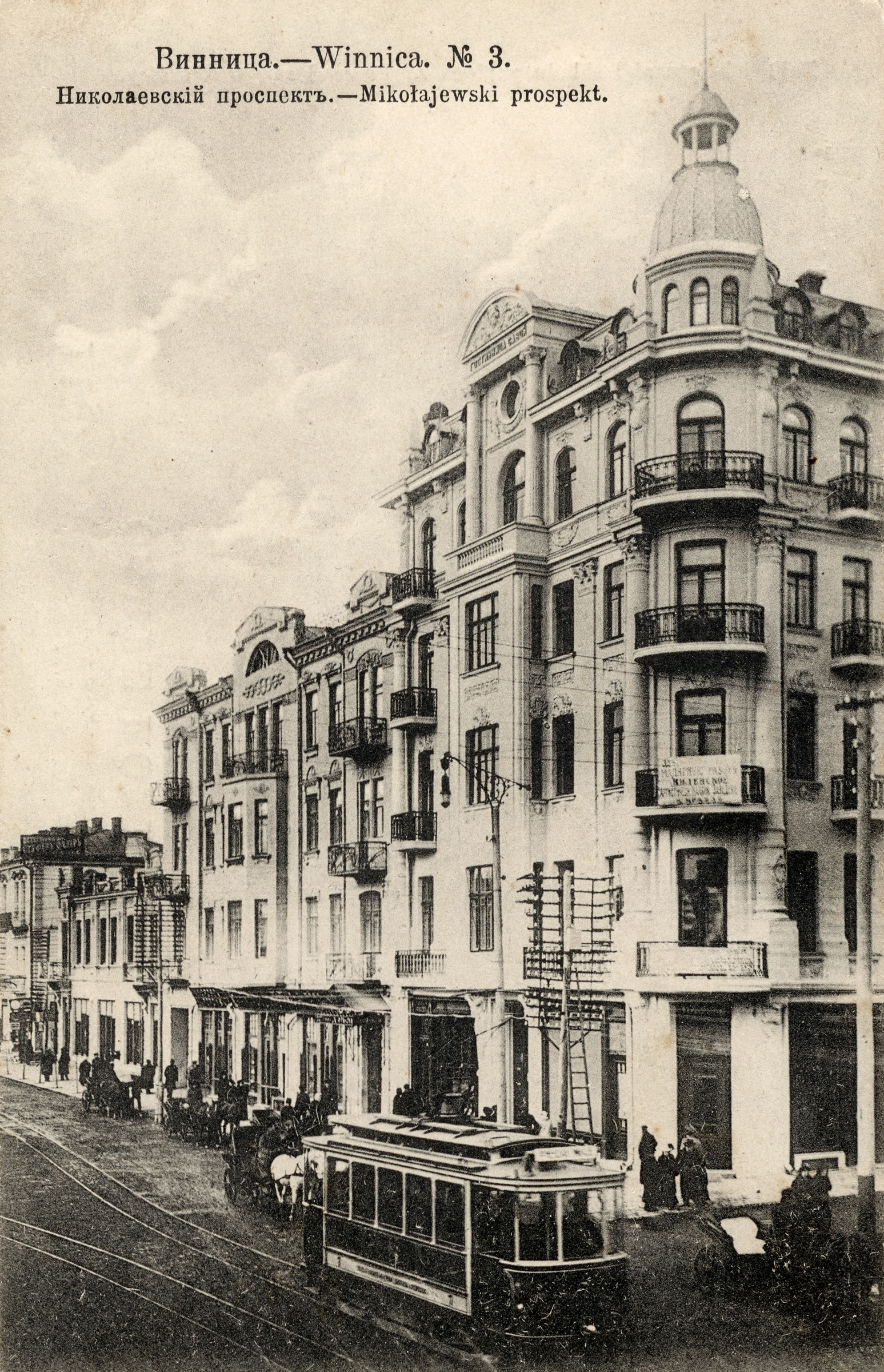
Vinnytsia on a 1910s postcard

In the Russian census of 1897, Vinnytsia had a population of 30,563. It was the third largest city in Podolia region after Kamianets-Podilskyi and Uman. After railway connections were completed in 1871, Vinnytsia developed rapidly economically and infrastructurally. The city architect Hryhorii Artynov erected a number of buildings (a water tower, a theater, churches, hotels and mansions), which still shape the city image.

=== Ukrainian War of Independence ===
During the Ukrainian Revolution of 1917–1920, Vinnytsia was chosen three times as the seat of government structures of the Ukrainian People's Republic. The residence of the Directory was Savoy Hotel, which turned the city into a de facto capital. On 6 March 1918, Vinnytsia became the seat of Bratslavshchyna, a newly established zemlia of the Ukrainian People's Republic, which was disbanded on 29 April 1918 by Hetman of Ukraine Pavlo Skoropadsky, who brought back old governorate divisions of the Russian Empire. On 16 May 1920, a meeting was held in Vinnytsia between the heads of Ukraine and Poland, Symon Petliura and Józef Piłsudski. After 1920, it was the capital of the Podolia Governorate of Ukraine.

=== Soviet rule ===
Soviet Vinnytsia became an industrial giant with an emphasis on sugar production, but in the shadow of its prosperity it experienced a devastating man-made famine occurred in Soviet Ukraine from 1932 to 1933.

In 1936, part of the Polish population was expelled by the Soviets to Kazakhstan. The Vinnytsia massacre was the mass execution of between 9,000 and 11,000 people in Vinnytsia by the Soviet secret police NKVD during the Great Purge in 1937–1938.

=== World War II ===
Vinnytsia was occupied by German troops on 19 July 1941 during World War II. While Vinnytsia had a pre-war Jewish population of over 34,000, only 17,000 of these Jews remained, with the rest of them successfully being evacuated to the interior of the Soviet Union beforehand. Virtually all of the Jews who remained in Vinnytsia under Nazi occupation were murdered in the Holocaust. Nazi atrocities were committed in and near Vinnytsia by Einsatzgruppe C. The neighborhood of the Jewish quarter of Yerusalimka was subsequently depopulated and underwent significant wartime damage.

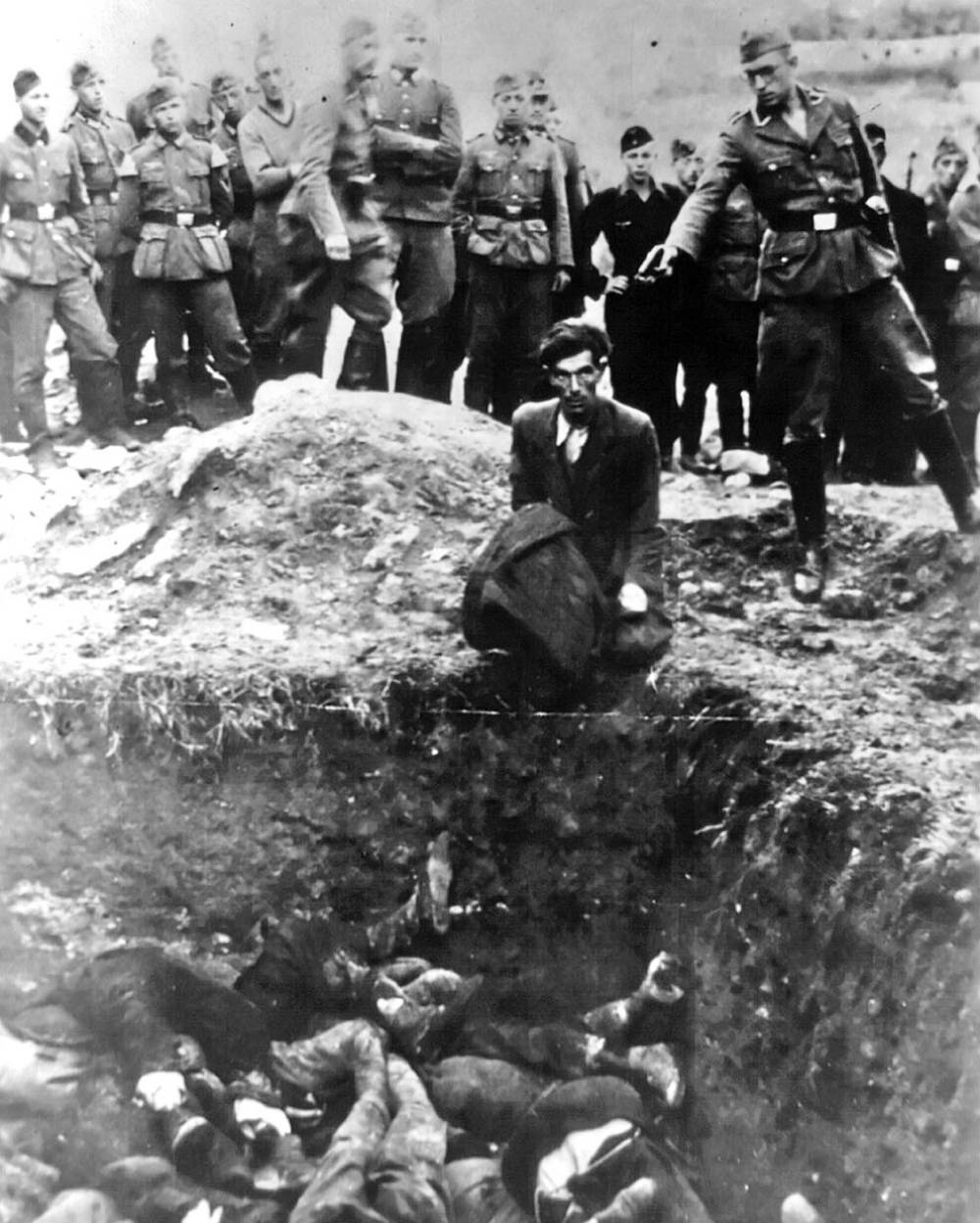
The last Jew in Vinnitsa

Related to that period is an infamous photo, known as The Last Jew of Vinnytsia. Recent research has suggested that the photograph was probably made in another town, Berdychiv, and not Vinnitsya The Last Jew in Vinnitsa is a photograph taken during the Holocaust in Ukraine showing an unknown Jewish man—probably on 28 July 1941—about to be shot dead by a member of the Einsatzgruppen, a mobile death squad of the German SS. The victim is kneeling beside a mass grave already containing bodies; behind, a group of SS and Reich Labor Service men watch.

Adolf Hitler sited his eastern headquarters, Führerhauptquartier Werwolf or Wehrwolf, at the Wehrmacht headquarters near the city. The complex was built in 1941–1942 by Russian prisoners of war. Many of them were killed. Hitler's accommodation consisted of a log cabin built around a private courtyard with its own concrete bunker. The complex included about 20 other log buildings, a power station, gardens, wells, three bunkers, a swimming pool, and wire and defensive positions.

Hitler spent a number of weeks at Wehrwolf in 1942 and early 1943. The few remains of the Wehrwolf site, described in one report as a "pile of concrete" because it was destroyed by the Nazis in 1944, can be visited. Plans to create a full-fledged museum had not come to fruition as of August 2018.

The Germans operated several forced labour camps in the city.

=== Later Soviet era ===
After the end of World War II, Vinnytsia was the home for major Soviet Air Forces base, including an airfield, a hospital, arsenals, and other military installations. The headquarters of the 43rd Rocket Army of the Strategic Rocket Forces was stationed in Vinnytsia from 1960 to the early 1990s. The 2nd Independent Heavy Bomber Aviation Corps, which later became 24th Air Army, was stationed in Vinnytsia from 1960 to 1992.

=== Independent Ukraine ===
The Ukrainian Air Force Command has been based in Vinnytsia since 1992. During the 2022 Russian invasion of Ukraine, the command center was significantly damaged by Russian cruise missiles on 25 March 2022.

On 14 July 2022 the center of the city was attacked with three Russian cruise missiles. Missiles hit the local NeuroMed clinic and House of the Officers, which was currently used as a concert hall. Due to the strike 27 people were killed (three children among them), 80 were hospitalized. The next day the Russian Ministry of defense said that the target was top-ranking Ukrainian military officers and representatives of foreign military industry companies.

On 12 October 2022, a pilot Vadym Voroshylov (call sign Karaia) destroyed 5 "Shahed 136" drones near Vinnytsia. Due to damage to the plane, Vadym ejected in Vinnytsia oblast, having previously diverted the fighter jet from the settlement. For this, he was awarded the title of Hero of Ukraine.

In 2023, the city of Vinnytsia opened a representative office to the European Union, becoming the fourth Ukrainian sub-national administration or organisation to take up an offer to use office space in the European Committee of the Regions (CoR).

On the night of 15-16 July 2025, Russia launched a large-scale attack on Ukraine, using an Iskander-M ballistic missile, about 400 Shahed strike drones, and various types of simulator drones. Two companies were hit by the attack: the Polish Barlinek Group and the Ukrainian Green Cool. There were no fatalities at Barlinek, but eight people were injured, two of them seriously burned. Shops and equipment were damaged, causing production to be suspended for several months. Green Cool also suffered damage to its production facilities. Four residential buildings near the companies were also damaged.

== Government and politics ==
Vinnytsia is the administrative center of Vinnytsia Oblast (region) and Vinnytsia Raion (district) within it. Until 14 February 2012, the city was divided into three urban districts: Leninskyi, Staromiskyi, and Zamostianskyi.

Vinnytsia is considered the long-time political base for Ukrainian oligarch and former President Petro Poroshenko. He owns a local confectionery (as part of the Roshen Corporation) and was elected member of parliament from the local constituency for several convocations. However, contrary to some speculations, Poroshenko has never lived in the city.

Volodymyr Groysman, the former Ukrainian prime minister (2016–2019), is from Vinnytsia.

== Population ==
Historical population

Year	Pop.	±%
1897	30,563	—
1926	52,454	+71.6%
1939	93,032	+77.4%
1959	121,854	+31.0%
1970	211,572	+73.6%
1979	314,446	+48.6%

Year	Pop.	±%
1989	374,304	+19.0%
2001	356,665	−4.7%
2011	369,490	+3.6%
2022	369,739	+0.1%
2026	370,814	+0.3%

As of 1 July 2026, the population of Vinnytsia is 370,814 people.

By population, among cities of Ukraine Vinnytsia ranks among the 10 largest cities (excluding the temporarily occupied territories).

=== Ethnic groups and languages ===
As of the Ukrainian census in 2001, Vinnytsia had a population of 356,665 inhabitants. As of the census, Ukrainians accounted for the overwhelming majority of the population, making up 87% of the population, while people of Russian descent accounted for 10%. Smaller minorities were Jews, Poles and Belarusians. According to a study of the Ukrainian research institute Rating conducted in 2017, the share of ethnic Ukrainians in the city increased to 94%, while the share of ethnic Russians dropped to 4%.

Exact distribution of the population by ethnicity according to the 2001 census:

Ethnic groups (2001)
	percent
Ukrainians	87.22%
Russians	10.18%
Jews	0.49%
Poles	0.45%
Belarusians	0.37%
Armenians	0.11%
others	1.18%

Distribution of the population by native languages according to the 2001 census:

Native languages (2001)
	percent
Ukrainian	84.7%
Russian	14.4%
Belarusian	0.1%
others	0.8%

According to a survey conducted by the International Republican Institute in April–May 2023, 85% of the city's population spoke Ukrainian at home, and 15% spoke Russian.

== Education and science ==
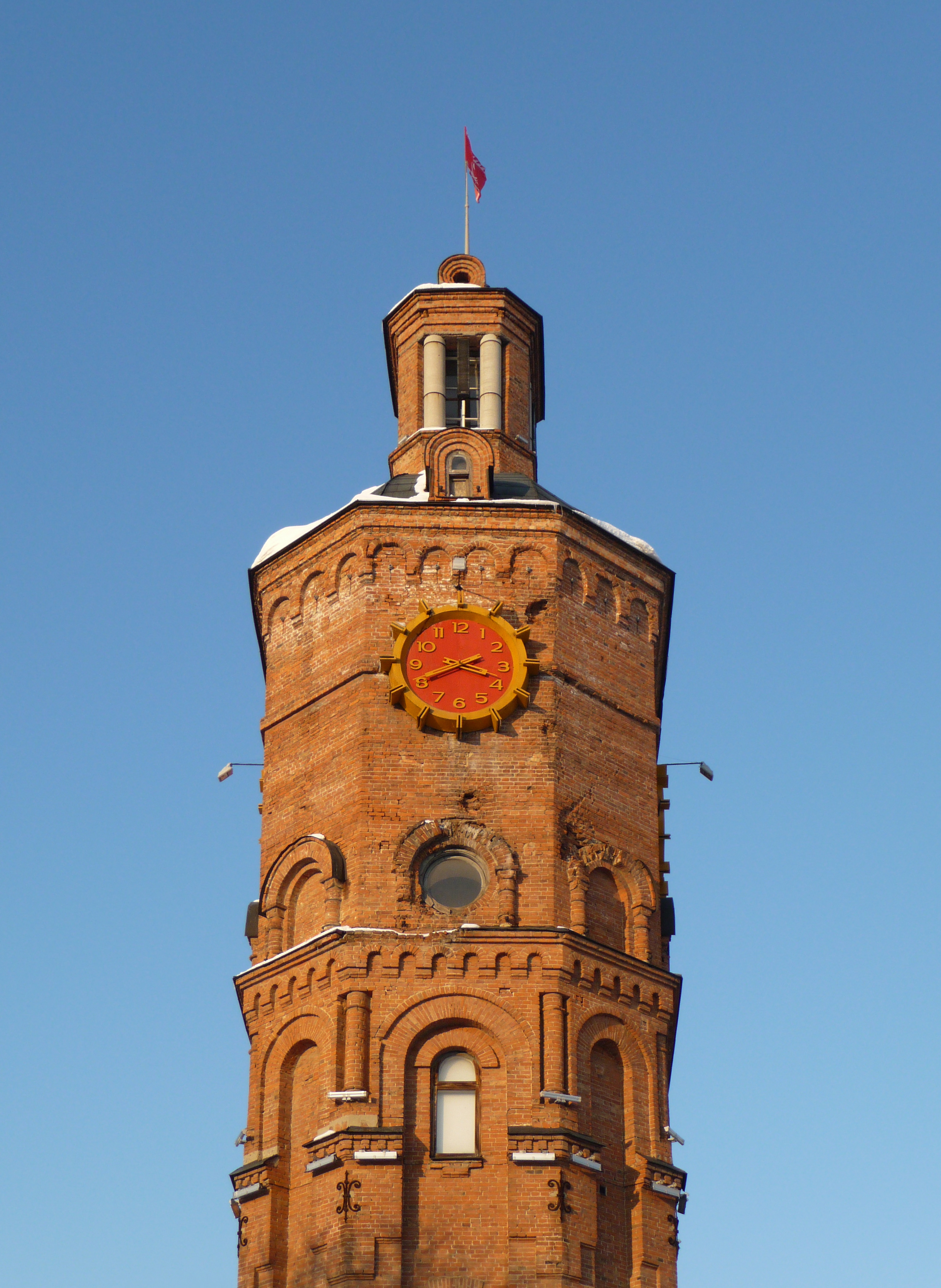
Detail of the Vinnytsia clock tower

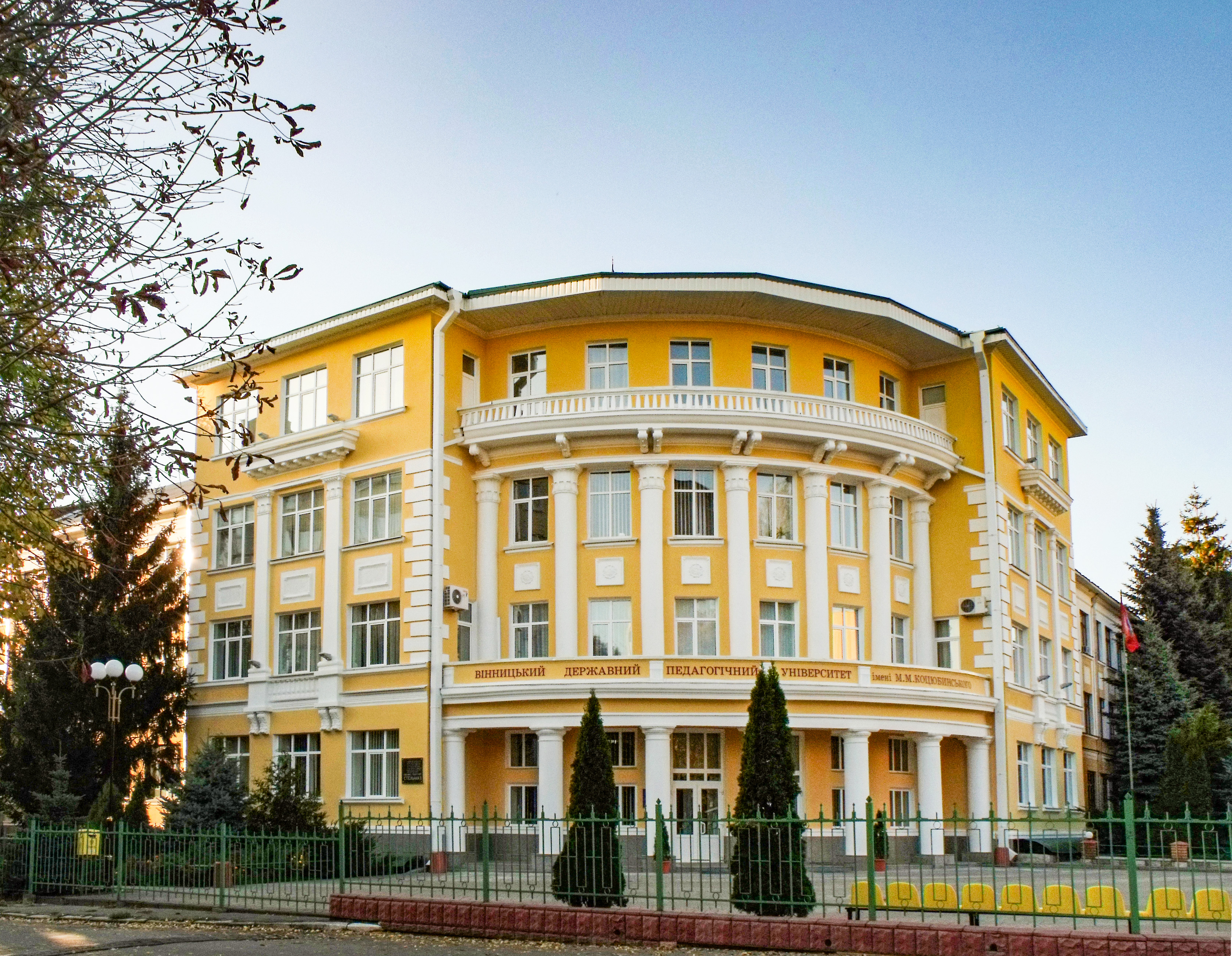
Vinnytsia State Pedagogical University

Educational institutions of the city of Vinnytsia:

- 64 preschool education institutions. Electronic registration is available for enrolling children in communally owned pre-school education institutions.
- 54 institutions of general secondary education (45 communal and 9 private forms of ownership)
- 8 institutions of state-owned professional (vocational and technical) education
- 3 community-owned out-of-school education institutions
  - Vinnytsia City Palace of Children and Youth
  - Vinnytsia city center of artistic and choreographic education of children and youth "Barvinok"
  - Center for Extracurricular Education "School of Success"

There are many universities and research institutions in Vinnytsia:

- Mykola Pirogov Vinnytsia National Medical University
- Vinnytsia National Agrarian University
- Vinnytsia National Technical University
- Mykhailo Kotsiubynskyi Vinnytsia State Pedagogical University
- Vasyl Stus Donetsk National University, evacuated from Donetsk in 2014 due to the Russian armed invasion in eastern Ukraine
- Vinnytsia European University
- Vinnytsia Institute of Trade and Economics of Kyiv National University of Trade and Economics
- Vinnytsia Educational and Scientific Institute of Economics of the Western Ukrainian National University
- Kharkiv National University of Internal Affairs (branch)
- Vinnytsia Cooperative Institute
- Vinnytsia Institute of Clothing Design and Entrepreneurship (private)
- Vinnytsia University of Finance and Economics (private)

There is also the Regional Universal Scientific Library, named after prominent local historian Valentyn Otamanovskyi, in Vinnytsia.

== Economy ==
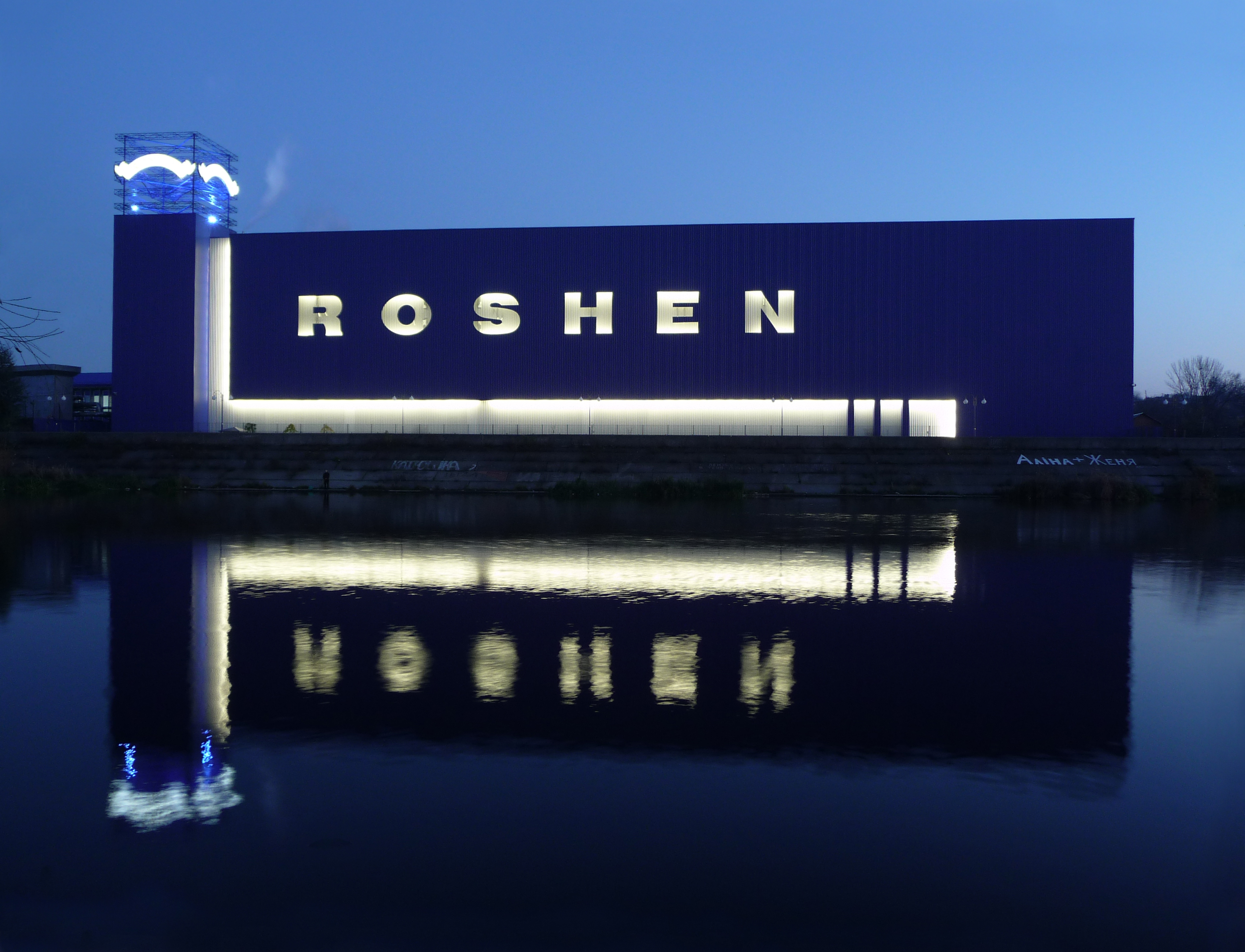
The Roshen confectionary factory

In the past, Vinnytsia had the Oktyabr Plant, a major Soviet electronics manufacturer.

There are Roshen confectionery corporation, Crystal diamond polishing corporation, RPC Fort largest Ukrainian firearms manufacturing corporation, Mayak corporation, Budmash corporation, Pnevmatyka corporation, PlasmaTec corporation, a parquet board manufacturer Barlinek Invest, Vinnytsia Oil and Fat Plant, Vinnytsia Food and Gustatory Factory PJSC, Agrana Food LLC and others.

During 2021–2025, the volume of industrial products sold in the city grew every year, reaching UAH 39.3 billion in January–September 2025, which is 54% more than in the same period in 2021. Such dynamics indicate a steady increase in the industrial potential of the community, due to the modernization of production facilities, the integration of relocated enterprises, and the development of industrial parks.

Investment/economic indicators (2021–2025)
Year	2021	2022	2023	2024	2025
Unit of measurement, thousand UAH	25,518,356.2	25,777,987.9	27,502,556.0	32,248,406.9	39,316,224.5

In the structure of industrial production in Vinnytsia, the leading place is occupied by the processing industry, which forms 74.2% of the total volume of products sold. The largest share is the food industry (38.8%), which confirms the agro-industrial specialization of the region. The machine-building industry (12.3%) demonstrates stable growth. The energy sector (24.4%) plays an important role, which ensures infrastructural stability and contributes to the energy independence of the community.

The agro-processing cluster AGROVIN was the only representative of its industry from Ukraine at the European Cluster Alliance 2025 forum.

=== Industrial parks and investments ===
There are six industrial parks with a total area of 135.7 ha on the territory of Vinnytsia City Territorial Community that are included in the Register of Industrial Parks of Ukraine: Vinnytsia Industrial Park (with an area of 35.7 ha), industrial park Vinnytsia Cluster of Refrigeration Engineering (with an area of 19.27 ha), industrial park Winter Sport (with an area of 25 ha), Industrial Park "VinIndustry" (with an area of 26.34 ha), Industrial Park "Integral" (with an area of 17.9 ha), and Industrial Park "Ecological Initiatives" (with an area of 11.5 ha). The facilities of UBC Cool (production of refrigeration equipment for food and beverages), KNESS (production of solar panels) are already operating on the basis of industrial parks, HEAD plant (production of equipment for winter sports) is under construction.

The total area of industrial parks in Vinnytsia is 135.7 hectares, with approximately one-third of the territory currently available for lease. One of the industrial parks is being developed as a base for a modern logistics hub, further expanding the city's infrastructure for investors. Vinnytsia consistently holds leading positions in investment attractiveness ratings; in 2021, it ranked second among the best Ukrainian cities for doing business according to Forbes Ukraine.

Construction of the Winter Sport industrial site resumed in May 2022.

The project of the first municipal innovation and technology park, "Crystal", in Ukraine has been implemented, the activities of which are designed to strengthen existing and create new high-tech and creative industries in Vinnytsia and the Podolsk region.

=== Digital economy ===
Vinnytsia is among the top five cities in terms of the number of specialists in IT. This sector is represented, in particular, by the following companies: Gemicle, Playtika, EPAM Ukraine, Infopulse, Avenga, Ajax System, Sigma Software, Ciklum, N-iX, RIA Internet Group, Softserve, and DataArt. The main office of LetyShops, the largest cashback service in Ukraine, the leader in this market segment, is located in the city.

The creative economy ecosystem is developing. In recent years, several private and community spaces have emerged in response to a growing demand: Artynov Creative Space, iHub Vinnytsia, M9, the Vinnytsia Regional Youth Center "Kvadrat", Cherdak, and the VNTU Startup School Sikorsky Challenge.

The Vinnytsia innovation and technology park "Crystal" is being developed on the premises of the former Crystal Jewelry Factory. It aim sto strengthen existing and create new high-tech and creative industries in Vinnytsia and the Podillia region. "Crystal" is an example of how old industrial facilities can be renovated and transformed into growth points for the creative economy and small businesses. The first phase of construction is being implemented as part of a joint project by the German governmental company GIZ and UNDP—Support to Rapid Economic Recovery of Ukrainian Municipalities (SRER)—and was scheduled to be commissioned in early 2025.

=== Clusters ===
As part of the decentralized cooperation program between the city of Vinnytsia and Vinnytsia region with the city of Dijon, the Burgundy-Franche-Comté region, AgroVin agricultural cluster was created in March 2021. The participants of the agrocluster are processing enterprises of the city of Vinnytsia, agricultural producers and specialized scientific institutions (Agrana Fruit Ukraine LLC, Vinnytsia Food and Gustatory Factory PJSC, Agroposluhtransservis LLC, Dibrova LLC, Organik-d LLC, Vinnytsia National Agrarian University, Institute of Fodder and Agriculture of Podillia National Academy of Sciences).

Vinnytsia Instrumentation and Automation Cluster was created in February 2021 by local enterprises (Promavtomatyka-Vinnytsia LLC, Innovinprom LLC, Maitek Plus LLC, Grampis LLC, Tiras LLC, Vinaerogis LLC, and others) that work in the instrument-making industry and are engaged in the automation of production with the aim of creating competitive products, creating jobs for the best local graduates, promoting the definition and implementation of smart specialization of the city territorial community and the region.

In 2021, the public union Vinnytsia Automation and Instrument Making Cluster (Vinnytsia AIM Cluster) was established. Its goal is to boost economic potential and develop the regional ecosystem of high-tech sectors. Currently, it includes 26 members, among them two universities, IT companies, and enterprises engaged in alternative energy, robotics, and medical technologies.

IT-Association Vinnytsia was founded in 2018, which has been actively operating for six consecutive years. It includes 18 members and 50 partners.

== Military ==
The headquarters of the Ukrainian Air Force is situated in Vinnytsia.

== Parks and squares ==
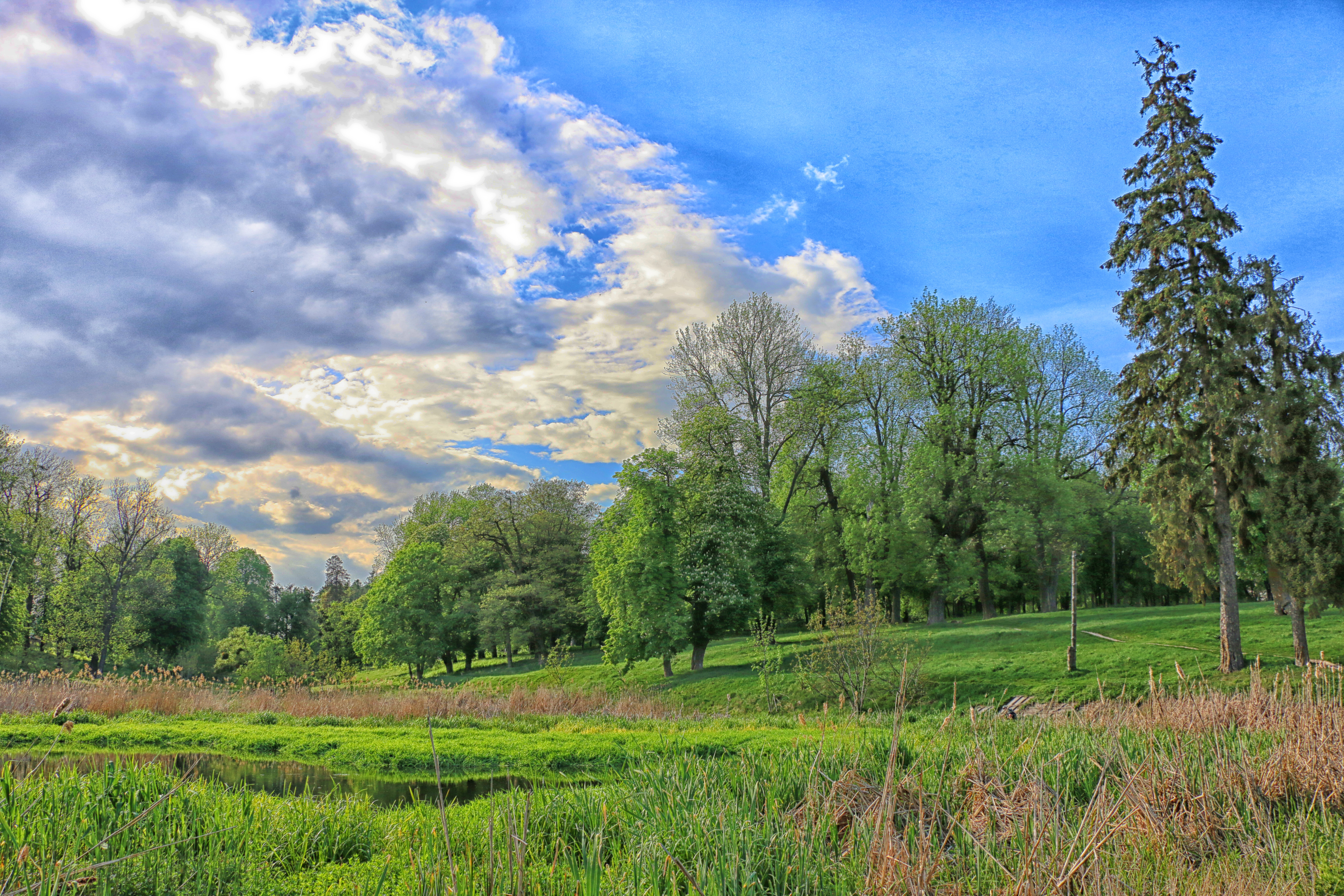
Pyatnichansky park

Central urban park in Vinnytsia

A park of culture and recreation named after Mykola Leontovych is located in Vinnytsia city between the streets Soborna (center), Mahistratska and Khmelnytske Shose. The park is 40 hectares.

There are numerous monuments (soldiers in Afghanistan, Sich Riflemen, killed police officers, victims of NKVD's purge), and the Alley of outstanding countrymen are objects of leisure and recreation: a summer theater, a stadium, an ice club, a city planetarium, a fountain, a chess club, Mini-Vinnytsia open air museum, numerous attractions and gaming machines.

For more than 70 years, the Central Park has been a place of celebration and recreation for the residents, and holds local and municipal events such as holiday celebrations. It has become tradition to hold folk festivals and all major holidays in the Park, in particular on the City Day, Europe Day, and Independence Day.

== Buildings and structures ==
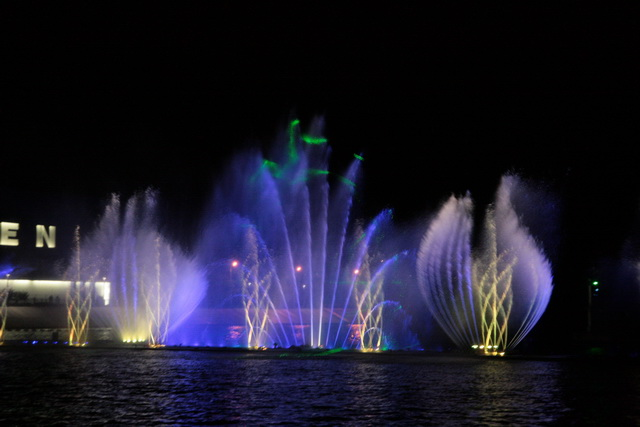
Fountain Roshen is the only one in Ukraine and the largest floating fountain in Europe, built in the river Southern Buh in Vinnytsia City near Campa Isle (Festivalny Isle).

- Saint Nicholas Church is considered to be the oldest building in the city; it was built in 1746 in the place of the older one
- Baroque Transfiguration Cathedral, built in Vinnytsia in 1758 by Italian architect Paolo Fontana
- Baroque Church of the Holy Virgin Mary Angelic, built in 1748–1761 as Capuchin monastery
- National Pirogov's Estate Museum and church, where his embalmed body is preserved; built in 1866–1885, opened for visitors as a museum in 1947
- The Literary and Memorial Museum of a "great Sun Worshiper", classical author of Ukrainian literature Mykhailo Kotsiubynsky, built in 1860–1890 and opened for visitors as a museum in 1927
- Vinnytsia water tower, built in 1912 by city main architect Hryhorii Artynov
- Savoy Hotel, built in 1912–1913
- Vaksman family's real estate, built in 1915 in Art Nouveau style. Address: 24, Symona Petliury Street. Built by architect Moisey Aaronovitch Vaksman. Architectural landmark.
- TV Tower Vinnytsia – the tallest guyed tubular steel mast in the world, built in 1961
- The new Greek Catholic Church at South Bug river, built in 1993–1996
- Baptist Church "Evangelical House", reportedly one of the largest Evangelical Church buildings in Europe, built in 1996
- Seventh-day Adventist Church, built in 2000
- Multimedia Fountain Roshen, built in 2011, considered one of the largest floating fountains in Europe. It is the major multimedia attraction in the city.

In the city, numerous historical buildings are being repaired and new ones are being built.

Architecture in Vinnytsia

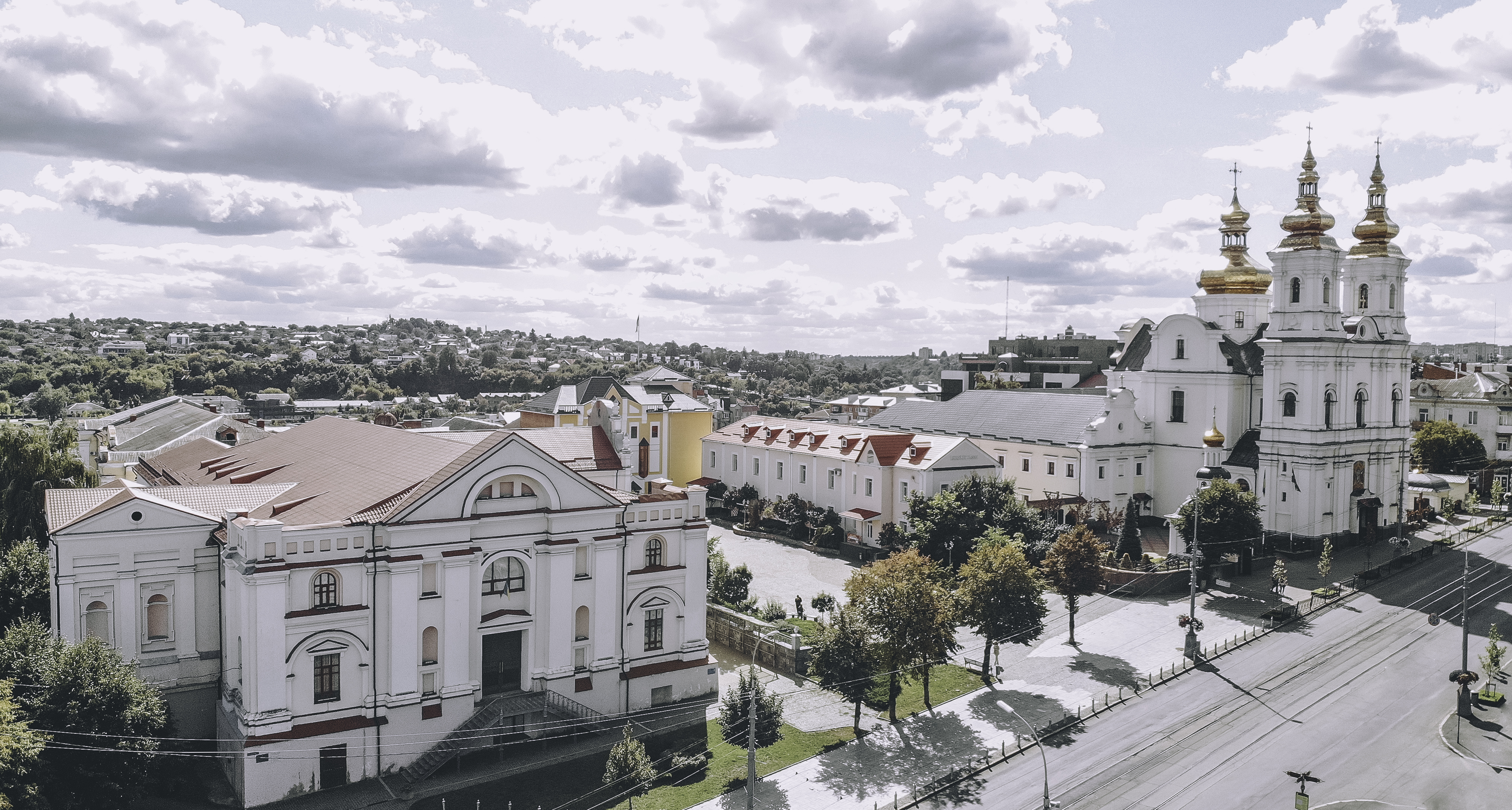
Former Jesuit monastery and Transfiguration Cathedral

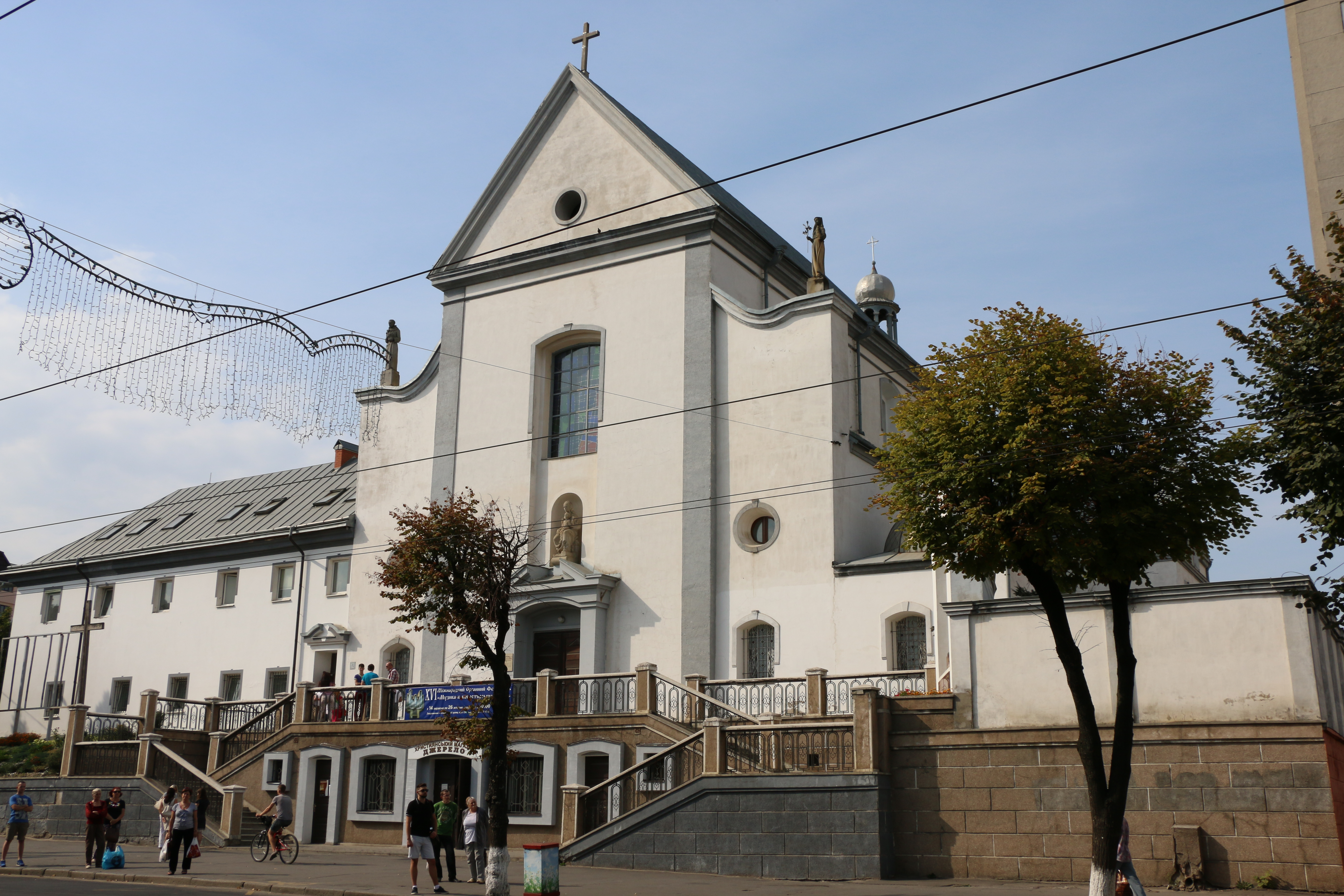
Capuchin monastery (est. 1748–1761)

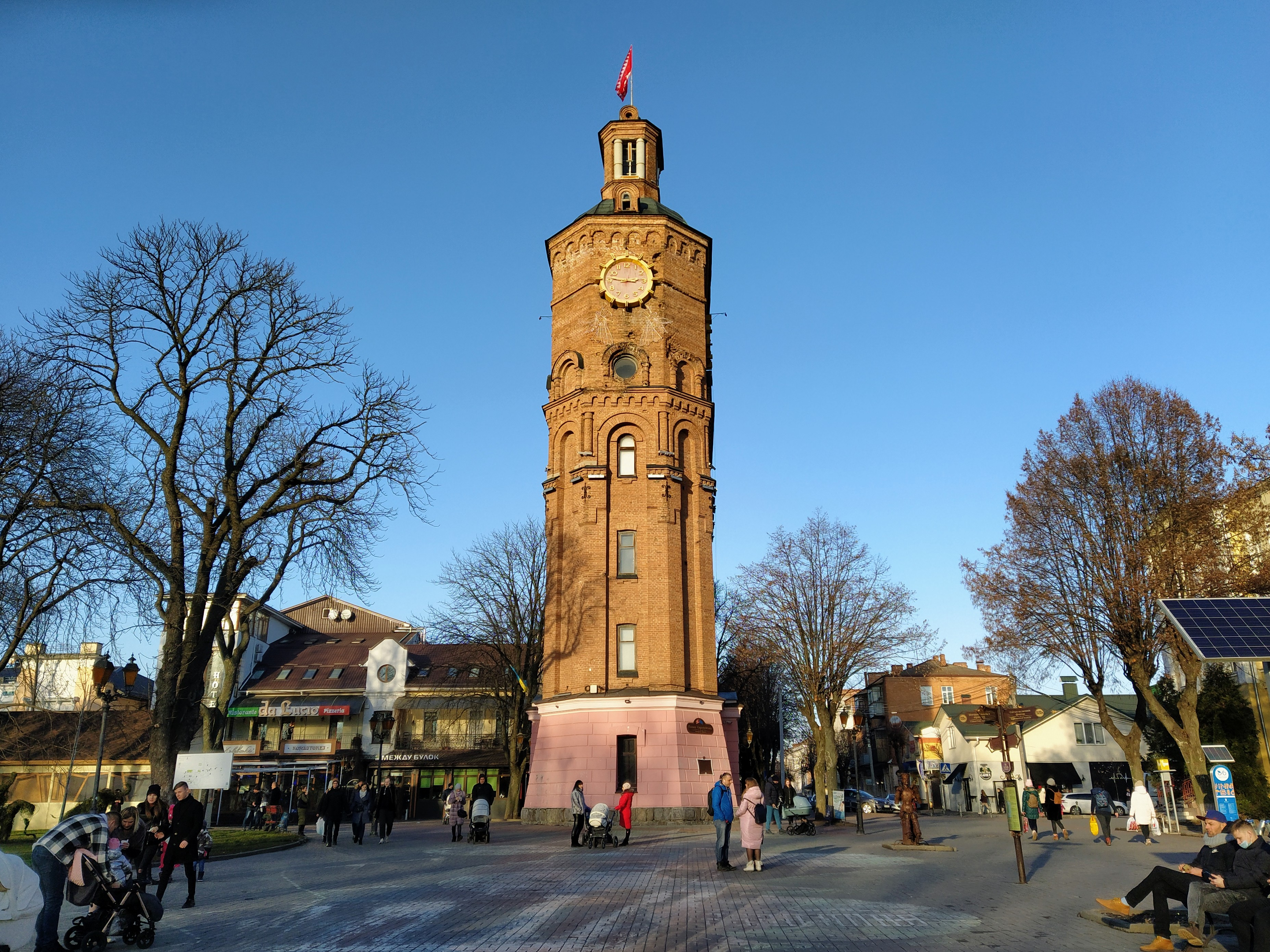
Vinnytsia water tower (est. 1912)

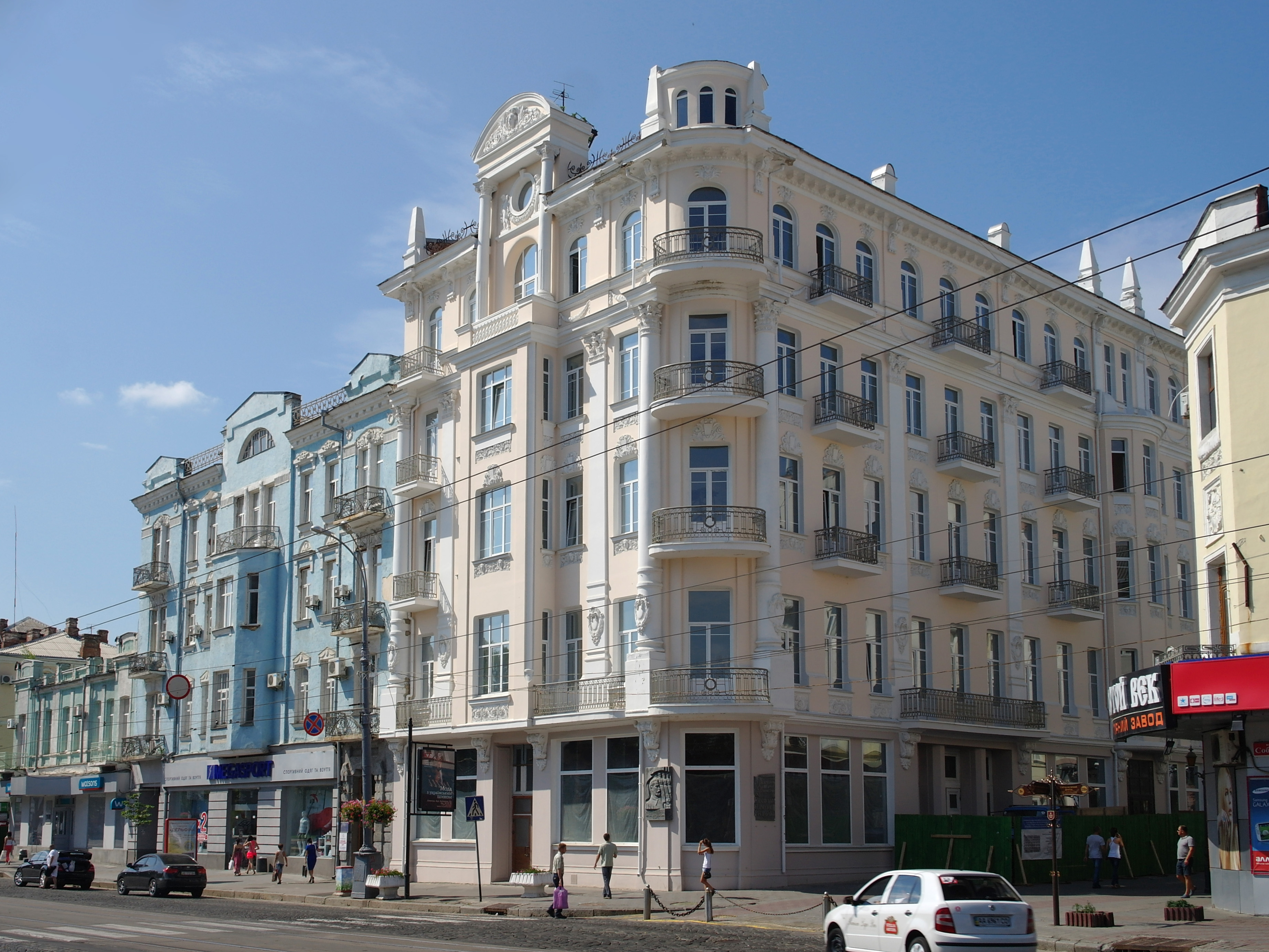
Savoy Hotel (est. 1912–1913)

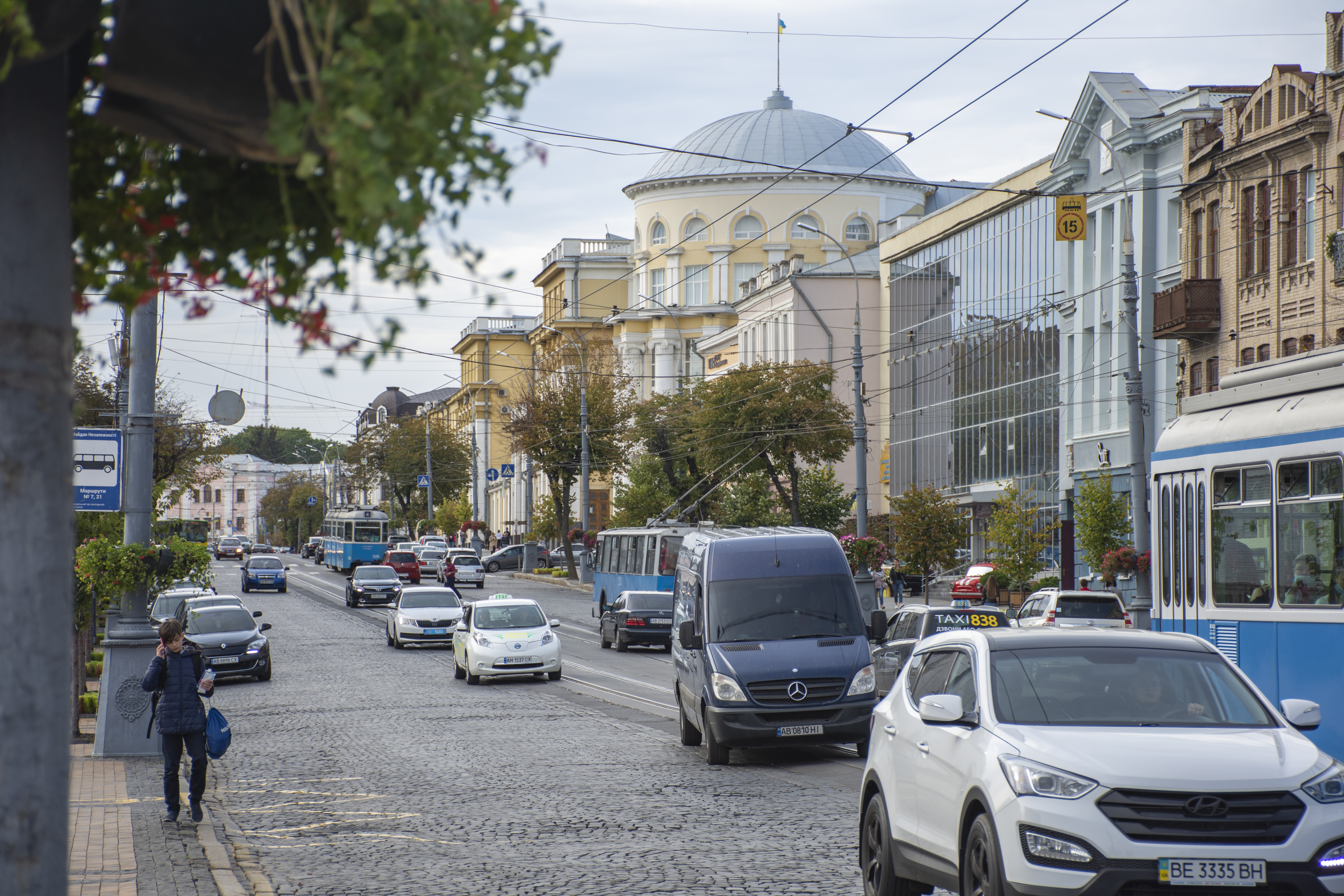
Cathedral Street, main thoroughfare of modern Vinnytsia

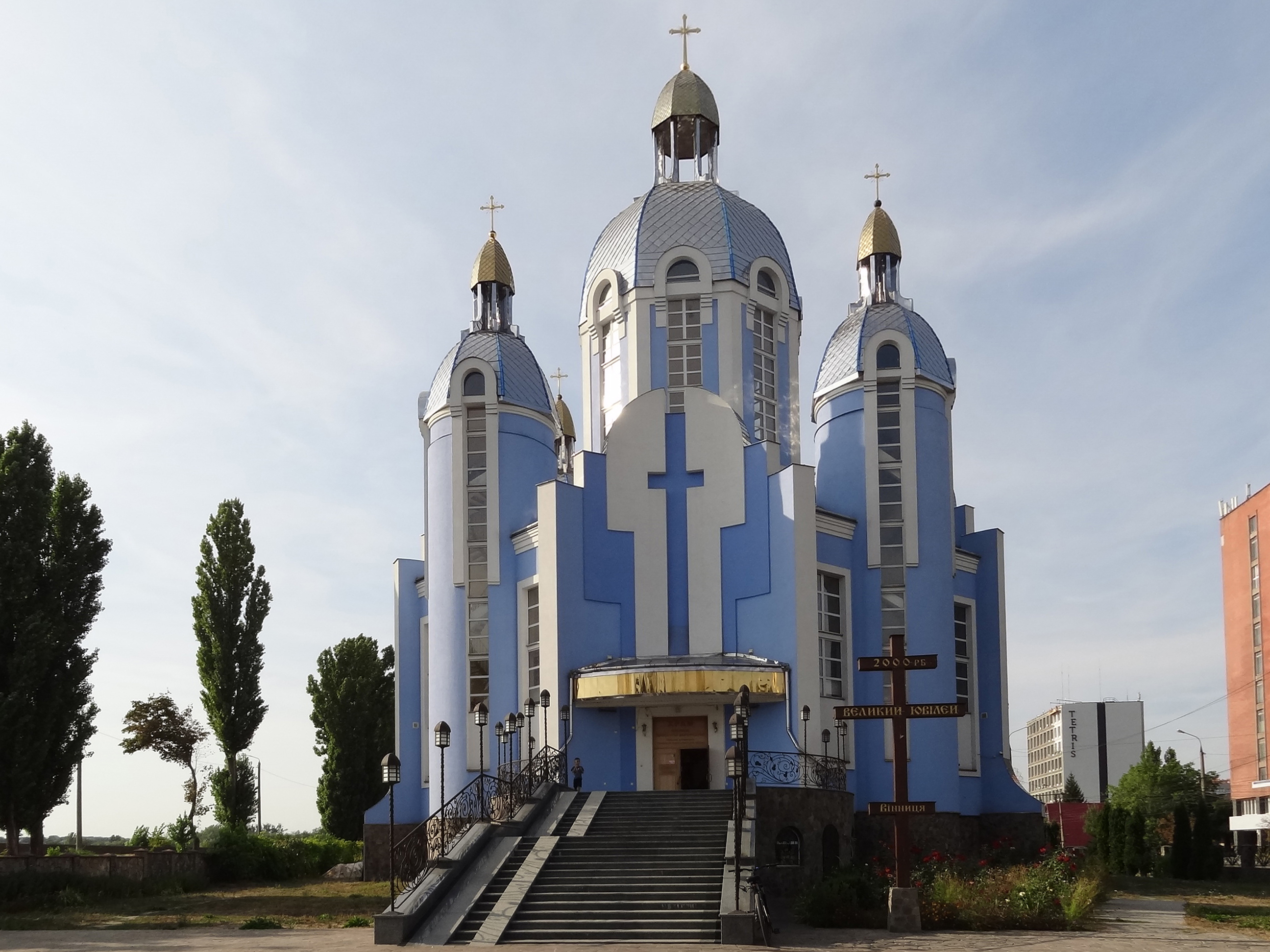
Church of the Intercession (est. 1996)

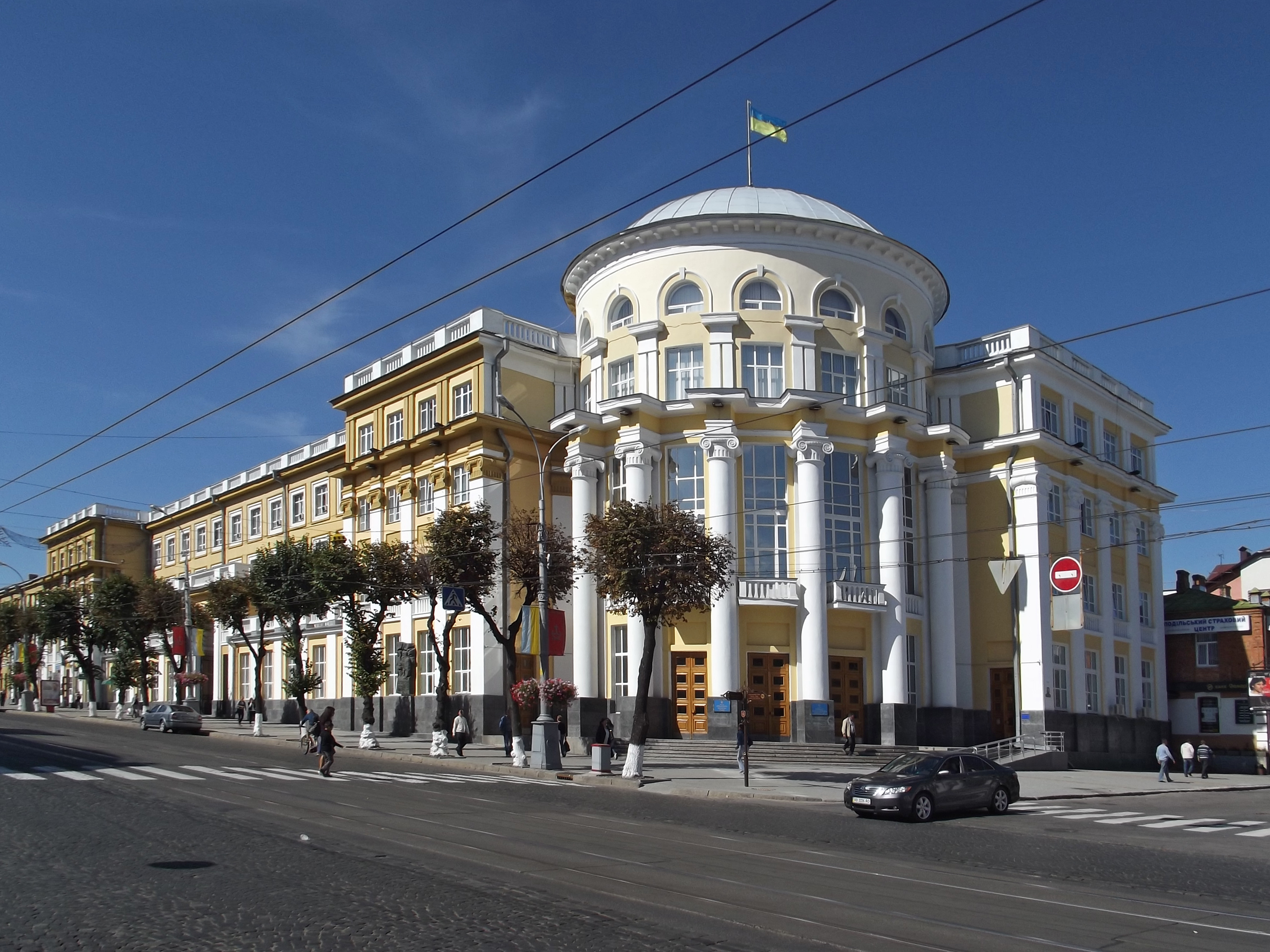
Vinnytsia regional council

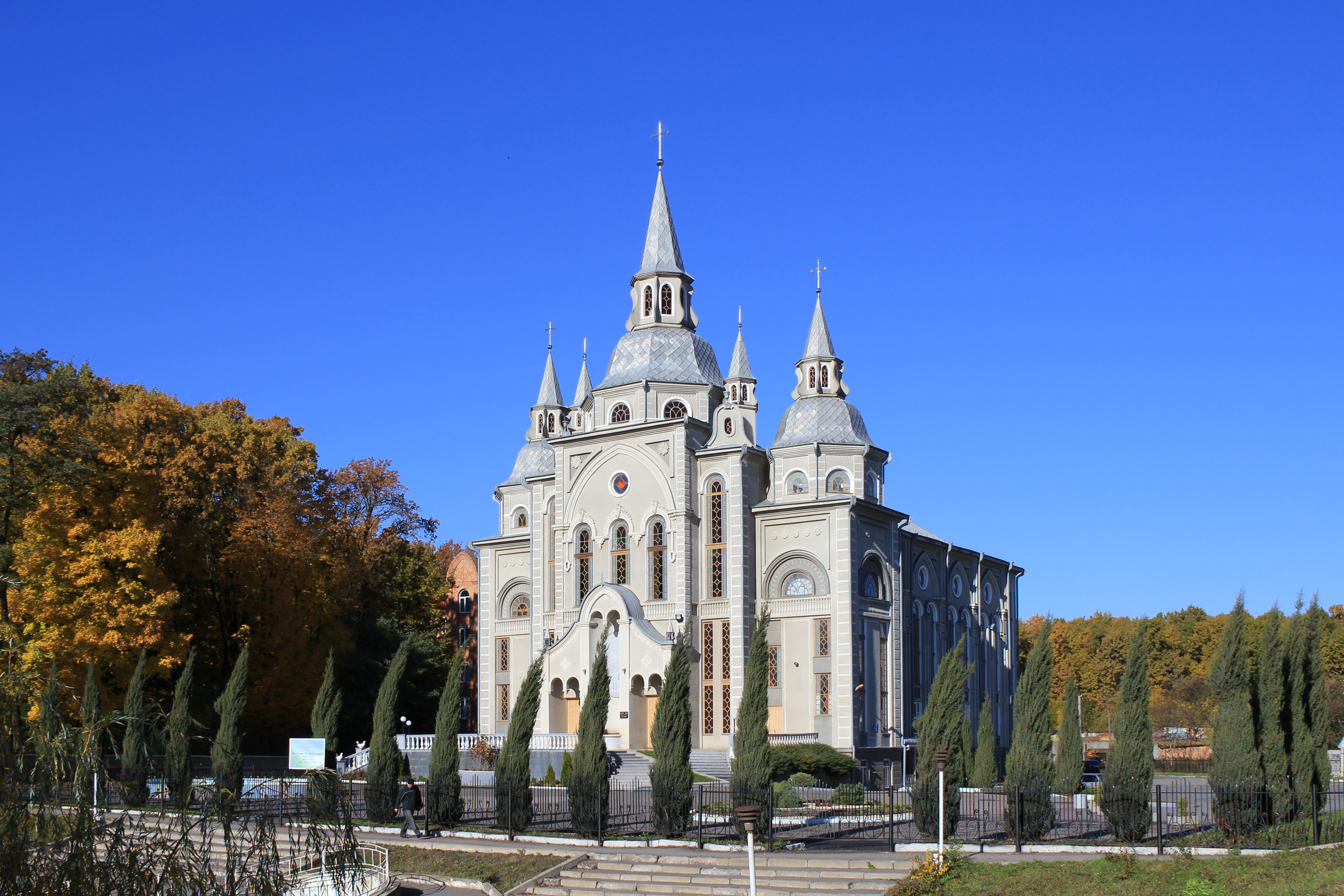
Baptist church

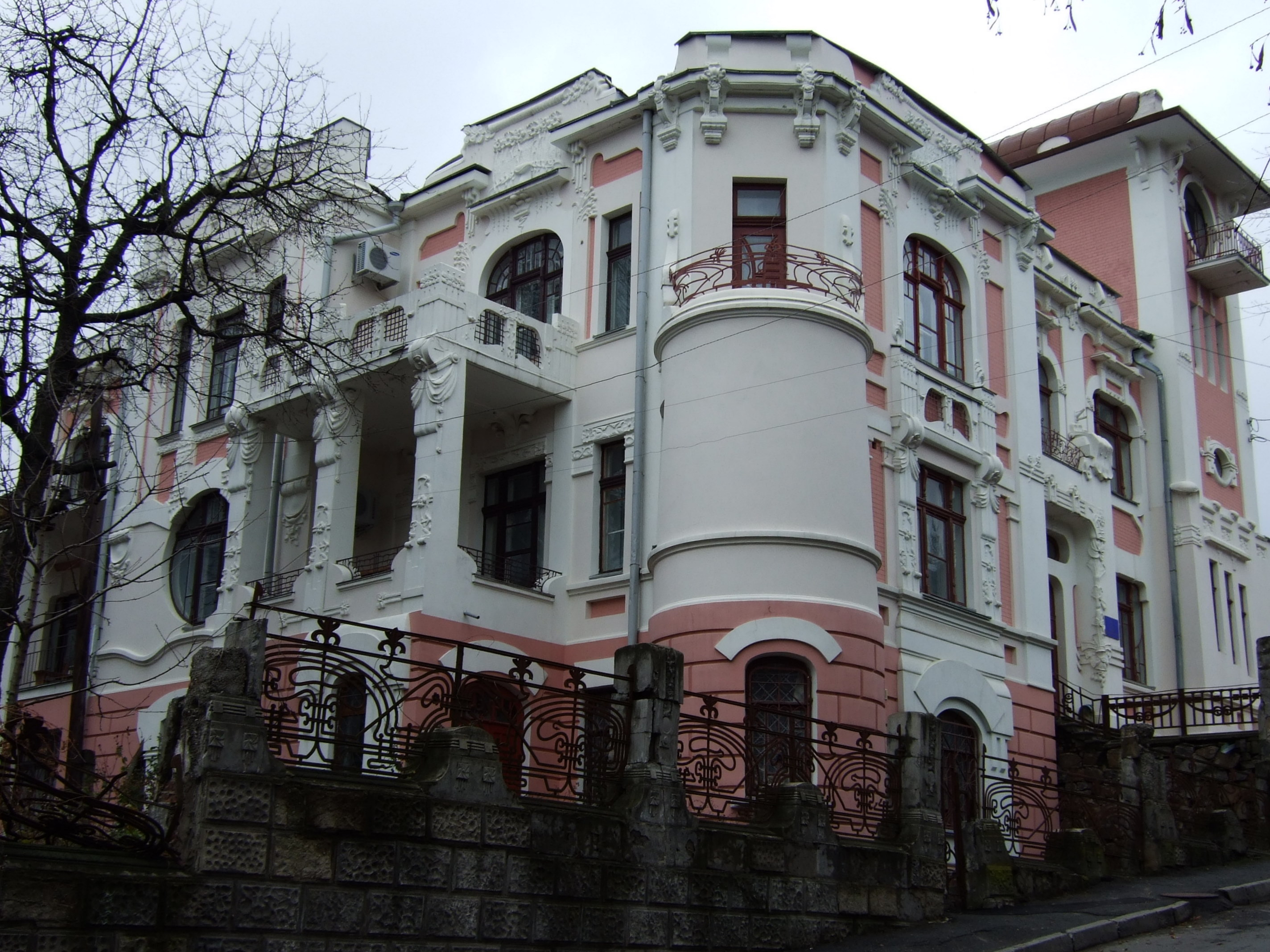
Art Nouveau building, built by architect V.P. Lystovnychyi

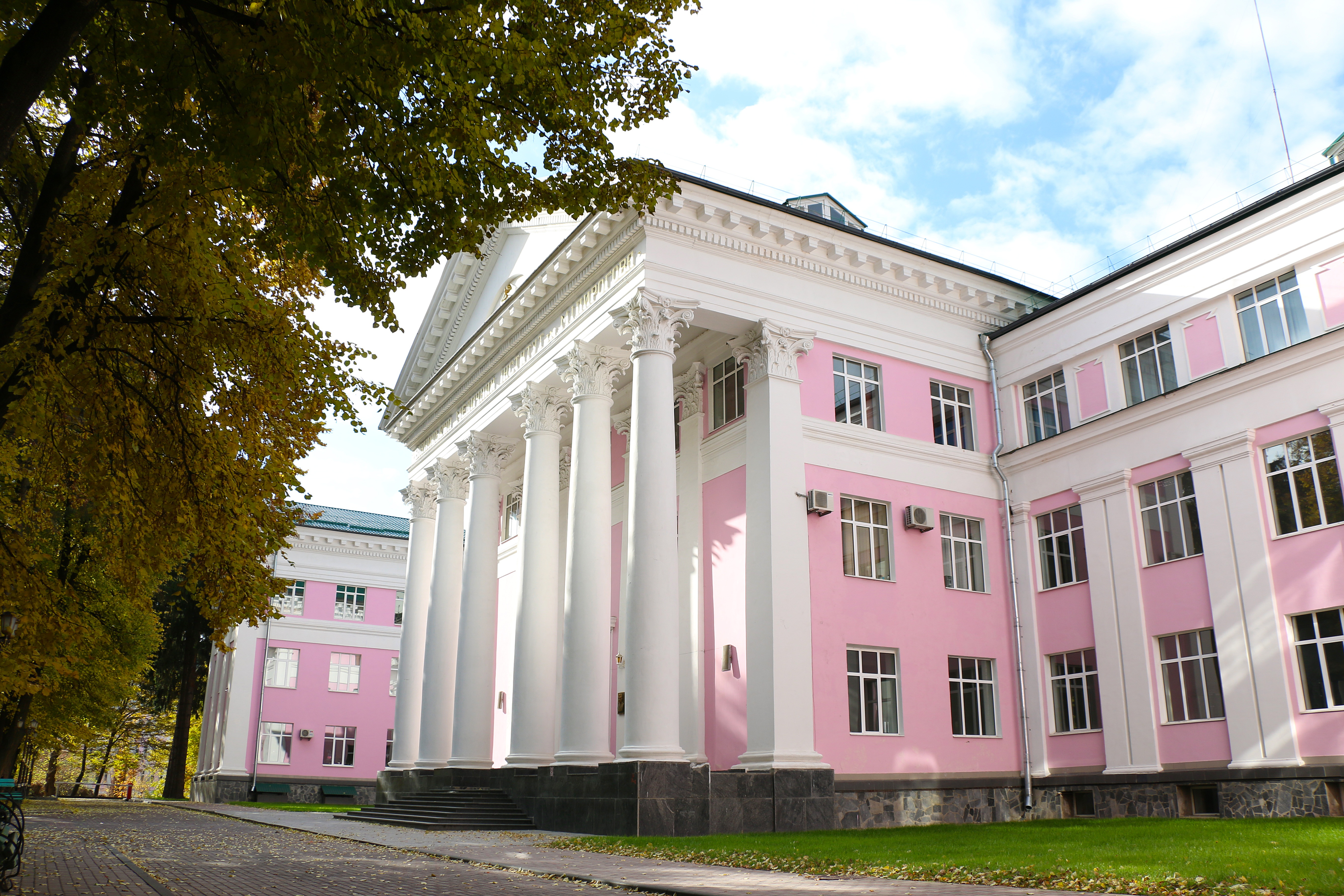
Medical University in Vinnytsia

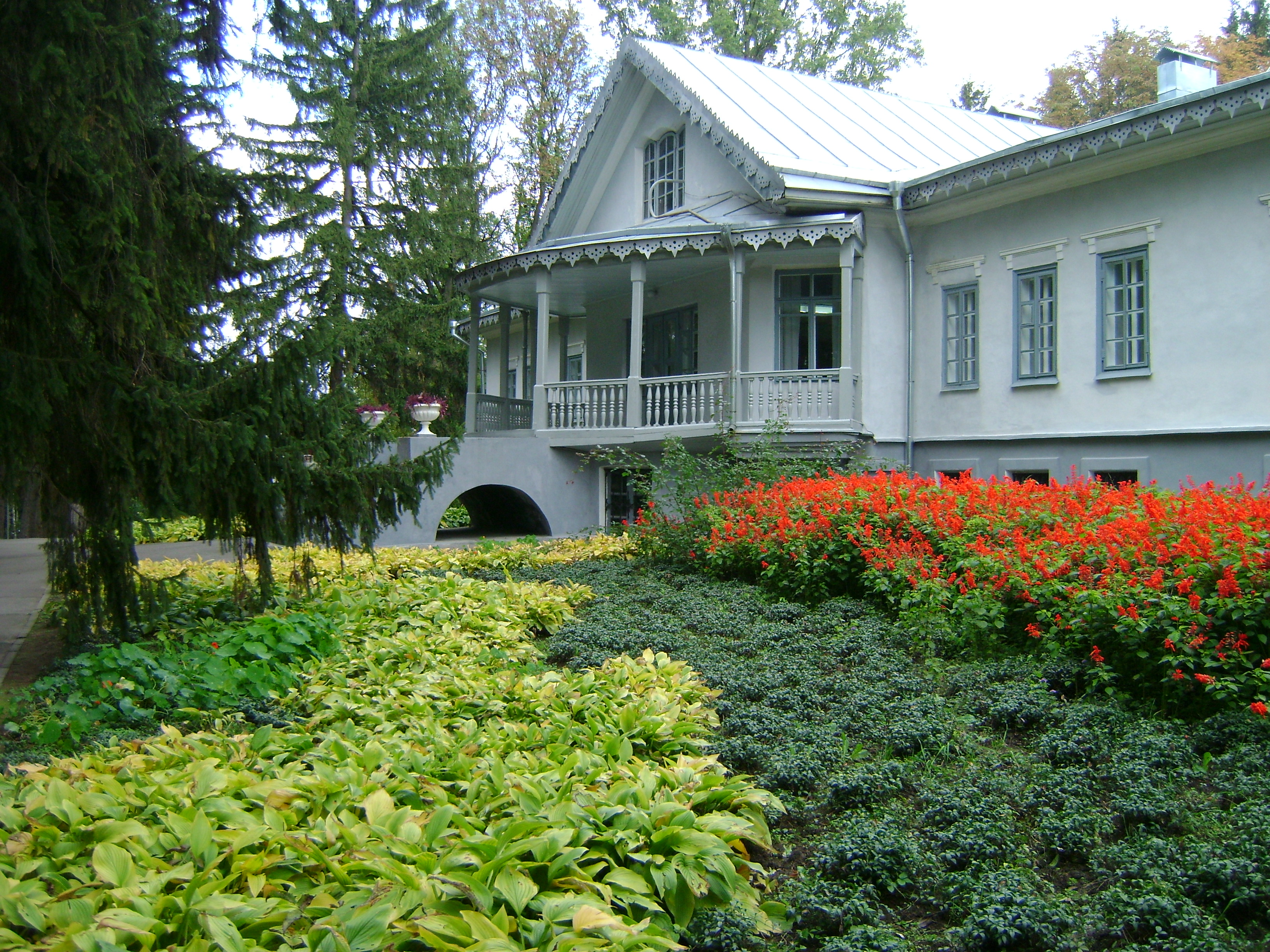
Mansion-museum of Nikolay Pirogov

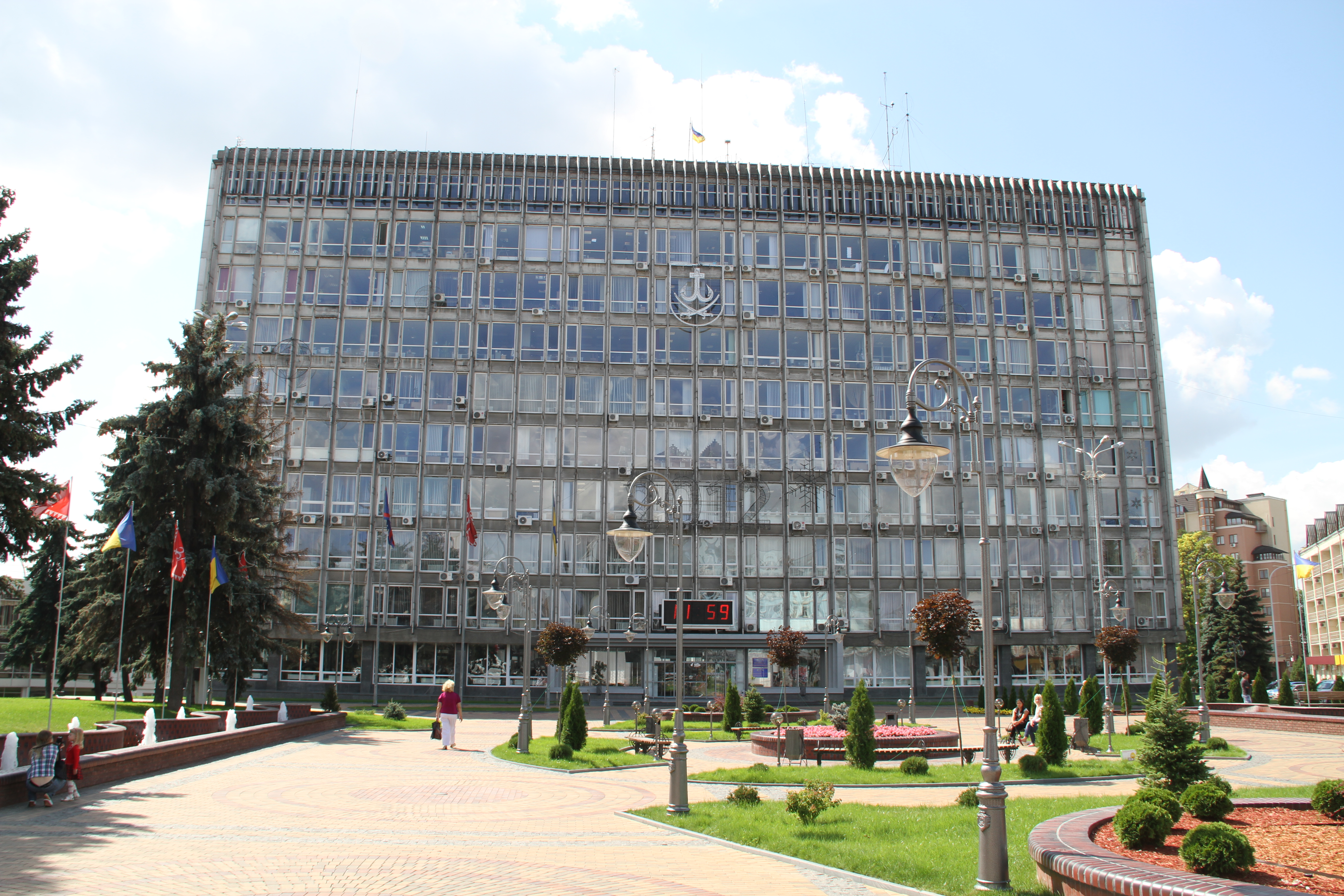
City hall

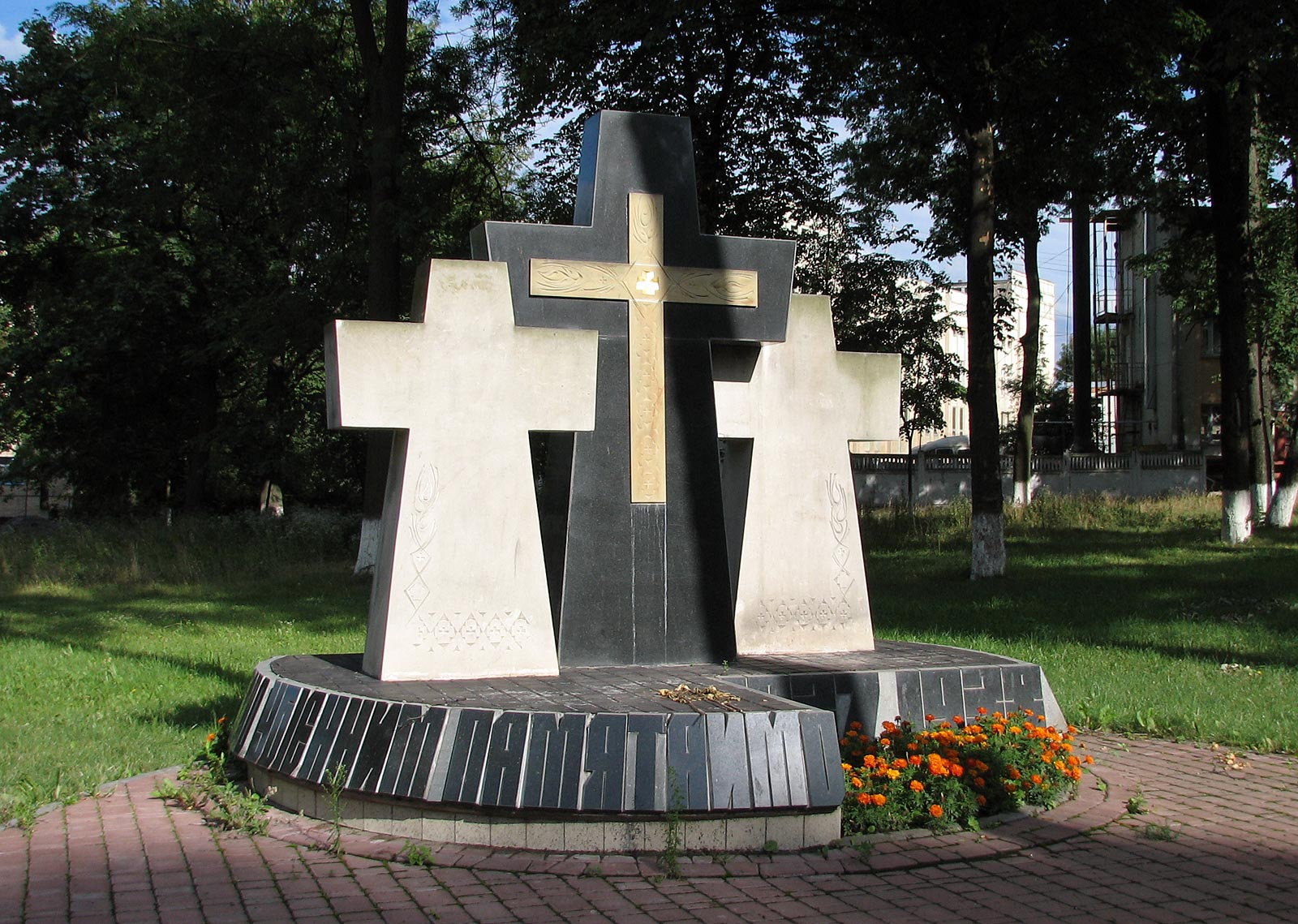
Monuments to the victims of the terror of 1937–1938

== Transport ==
The city has five bridges over the Southern Bug: Kyivsky (with trolleybus connection), Central (with trams and trolleybuses), Staromisky, on the Bypass Road, as well as a pedestrian bridge on the dam in Sabariv.

Transport facilities in Vinnytsia include:

- Railway station, which has connections with 23 regions of Ukraine
- Three bus stations (central, western, eastern)
- Motorways, including 389.3 km of roads in Vinnytsia itself, of which 257.1 km are asphalt-concrete, the rest are gravel and dirt (2021 data)
- Vinnytsia Airport. As of 2017, it received regular and charter flights to the following cities: Warsaw, Tel Aviv, Antalya, Sharm el-Sheikh and Podgorica. Since 2019, preparations have been underway for the reconstruction of the runway and the airport terminal, but the work was interrupted first due to the COVID-19 pandemic, and later - the Russian invasion of Ukraine.
- A network of bicycle paths, which is 96.5 km (with 1,758 bicycle parking spaces)

The city's public transport has an extensive network of tram, trolleybus, bus and taxi routes. Tram and trolleybus operation begins at 5:30 and ends at 00:00 (as of 1 July 2026, the vast majority of routes operate from 5:30-6:00 to 22:00-23:00). The basis of Vinnytsia's tram fleet is made up of Karpfen, Mirage and Tram2000 cars, transferred by the municipality of Zurich since 2007. Since 2015, Vinnytsia Transport Company has been manufacturing VinWay trams based on Tatra KT4SU cars and VinLine trolleybuses. As of 1 July 2026, the following trams — 60 units, trolleybuses — 80 units, buses — 49 units are operating daily. All public transport in Vinnytsia operates on the basis of contactless fare payment. Fares can be purchased by using a municipal Vinnytsia citizen's card, a payment card with NFC technology, a QR code via the Privat 24 and monobank mobile applications, a card of any bank via Google Pay or Apple Pay, or a regular bank card via a validator.

As of 1 July 2026, 22,047.3 thousand passengers were transported by all types of municipal public transport of the Vinnytsia Transport Company. 18,181.7 thousand passengers used the services of urban electric transport (tram, trolleybus), which is 82.5% of the total volume of passenger transportation.

=== Air ===
Havryshivka Vinnytsia International Airport (IATA: VIN, ICAO: UKWW) is situated near Vinnytsia.

=== Railway ===
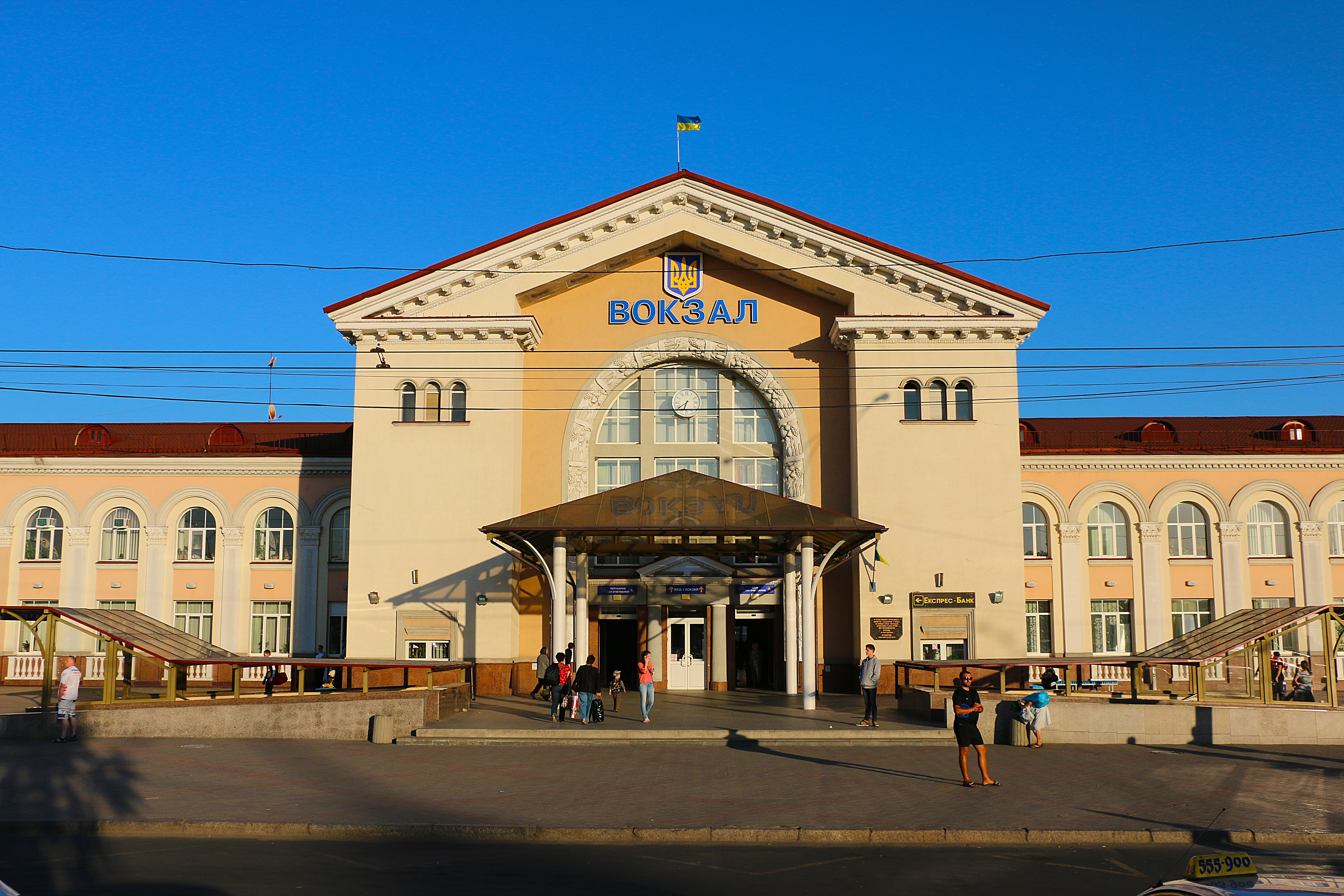
Vinnytsia railway station

There is a railway station in Vinnytsia, Vinnytsia railway station, which is a part of Southwestern Railways. In 2013 it was named among 10 biggest railway stations in Ukraine. The current Vinnytsia railway station was built in 1952 and is the 4th railway building in Vinnytsia. The previous three were destroyed.

Vinnytsia is an important transport hub for internal and external railway connections. Most of the international trains which cross through Ukraine have a stop in Vinnytsia. For example, trains to Przemyśl (Poland) and from Sofia (Bulgaria), Chisinau (Moldova), Bratislava (Slovakia), Belgrade (Serbia), Budapest (Hungary) transit through Vinnytsia. For internal railway connections, Vinnytsia is also an important transport point for trains heading to Western Ukraine (Lviv, Khmelnytskyi, Chernivtsi), the South (Odesa), as well as to Central Ukraine (Kyiv).

=== Tram ===
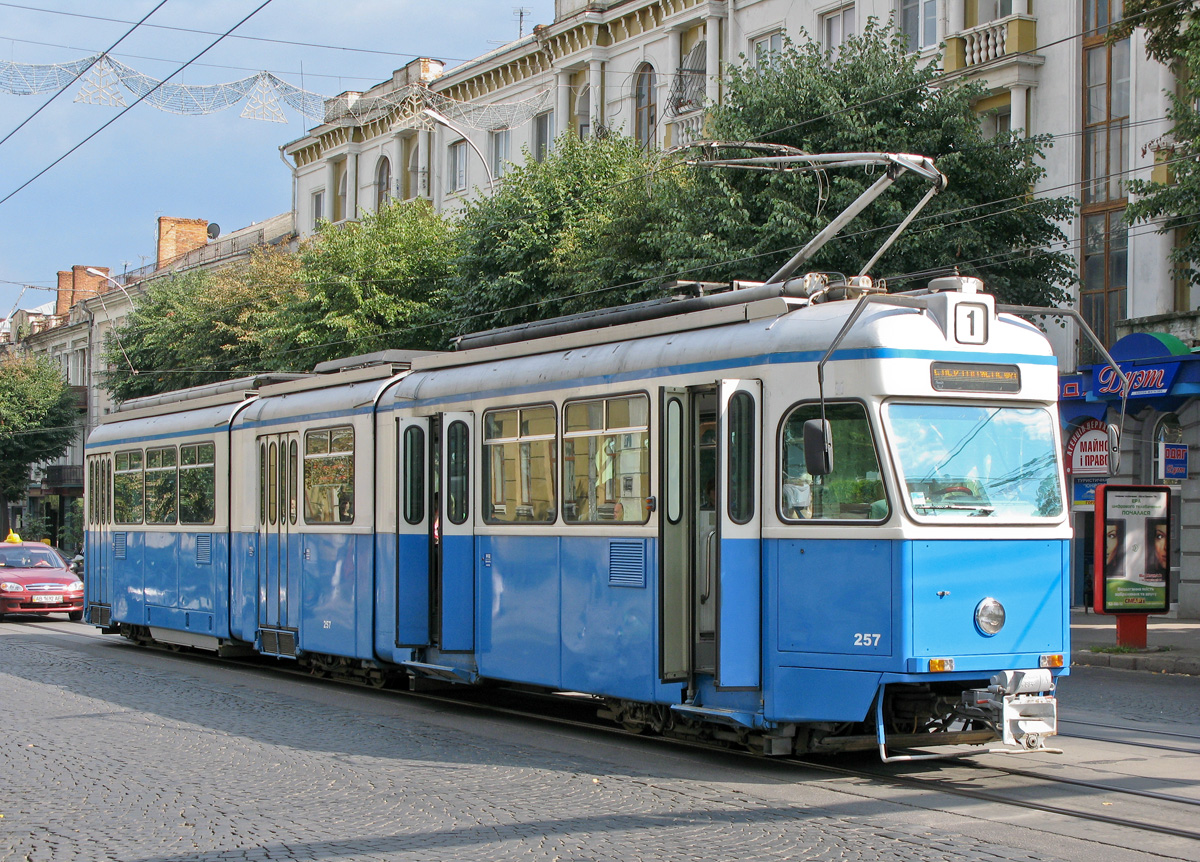
Trams in Vinnytsia

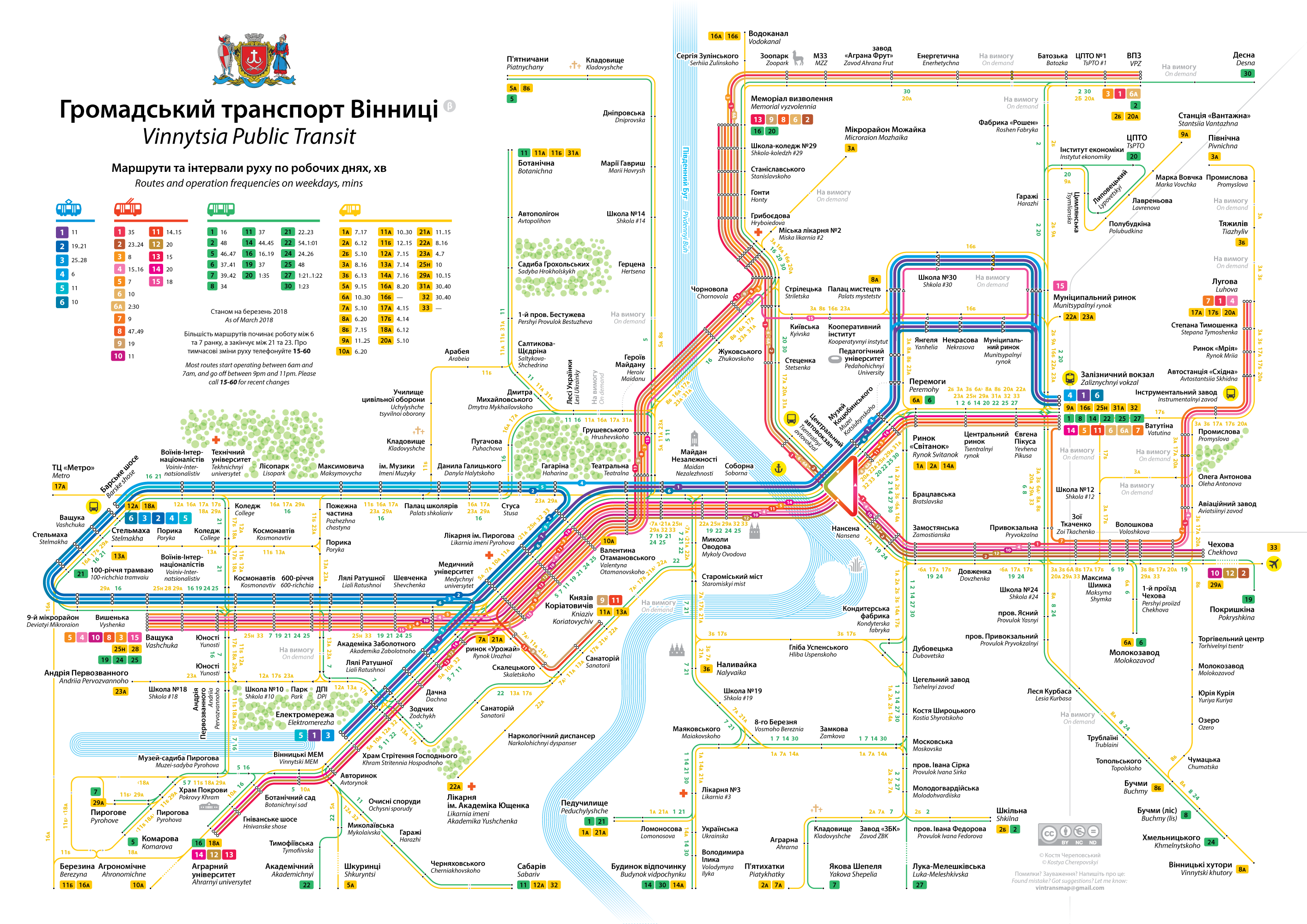
An unofficial transit map of Vinnytsia featuring tram, trolleybus, bus and minibus (marshrutka) routes

The tram is the most popular public transport in Vinnytsia. There are six tram routes in Vinnytsia:

Route number	Route starting and ending point
1	The railway station (Zaliznychnyi vokzal) – Elektromerezha
2	Barske Shose – Vyshen'ka
3	Vyshen'ka – Electromerezha
4	Barske Shose – the Railway station (Zaliznychnyi vokzal)
5	Barske Shose – Elektromerezha
6	The railway station (Zaliznychnyi vokzal) – Vyshen'ka

Most trams in Vinnytsia are donations from the Verkehrsbetriebe Zürich (VBZ), the public transport operator of Zürich, Switzerland. In the early 2000s, the VBZ donated its 1960s Karpfen and Mirage rolling stock to Vinnytsia, and they planned to do so again in 2022 with 35 Tram 2000 vehicles. The Swiss trams retain their blue and white liveries in Vinnytsian service.

Since 2015, Vinnytsia Transport Company began manufacturing VinWay trams based on Tatra KT4SU wagons and VinLine trolleybuses. As of 2025, 10 modernized trams and 31 trolleybuses are running in the city.

=== Bus ===
In Vinnytsia, there are the Central Bus Station and the Western Bus Station, which connects Vinnytsia with Bar, Ukraine and other destinations.

== Healthcare ==
As of 1 January 2026, the city's healthcare system is represented by more than 40 treatment and preventive medical institutions, 12 of which are communally owned by the city of Vinnytsia. There are more than 49 private medical institutions.

Vinnytsia Regional Clinical Hospital named after Mykola Pirogov of Vinnytsia Regional Council was founded in Vinnytsia in 1805 as the first municipal hospital, and under the name of Mykola Pirogov has been operating since 1917. Today, the hospital is a multidisciplinary, highly specialised, curative and preventive health care institution, whose mandate is to provide medical assistance to patients in 22 specialized areas. 12 clinical departments and cycles of Vinnytsia National Medical University named after Mykola Pirogov are located in the centers and departments of the hospital.

Vinnytsia Regional Clinical Treatment and Diagnostic Center for Cardiovascular Pathology is a specialized medical facility that provides routine and emergency medical care to patients with diseases of the circulatory system. The institution has five departments and a clinical diagnostic laboratory with 186 medical workers. The center provides coronary angiography (diagnostics of heart vessels), stenting of damaged arteries, open heart surgery.

The emergency hospital provides emergency medical care 24/7 for surgical pathology, trauma, stroke, urological, and ENT pathology. About 100 patients visit the hospital's emergency room every day. More than 16,000 surgical interventions are performed annually.

== Sport and sportsmen ==
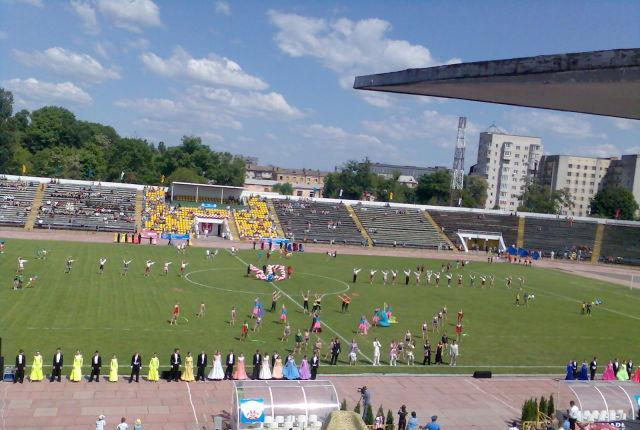
Tsentralnyi Stadion

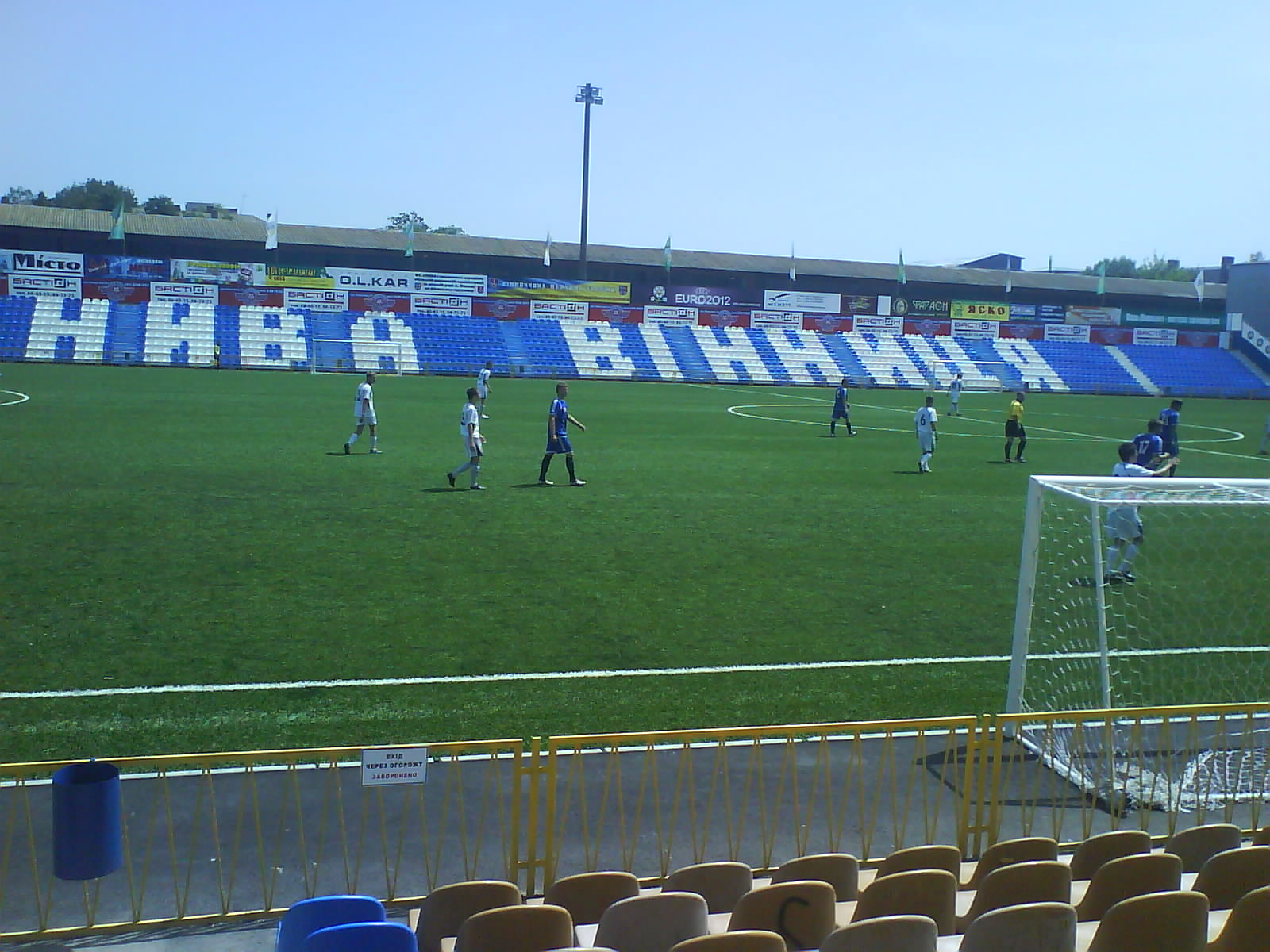
Home stadium of PFC Nyva Vinnytsia

The sport in the city of Vinnytsia is concentrated around the Tsentralnyi Stadion (Central Stadium), which was built in 1949. The stadium is built to hold competitions in many sports.

Since establishing the Vinnytsia Oblast in 1932, Vinnytsia became its administrative center. The city became the center of cultural life (including sports) in the whole region formerly known as Podolia.

In 1958, the football team of masters Lokomotiv was established in Vinnytsia, today known as Nyva Vinnytsia. The team was established for the All-Soviet competitions in Class B (tier 2). Initially, it was intended to be located in Kyiv (first owner Southwestern Railways), but, due to politics, it moved to Vinnytsia. It was the only team from the region (Vinnytsia Oblast) that competed at the All-Soviet competitions. While competing at the Soviet competitions, Nyva Vinnytsia won the republican championship of the Ukrainian SSR twice, in 1964 and 1984. On 2 January 2021, Nyva player Artur Zahorulko became the club's president.

Vinnytsia is the base of the Ukrainian field hockey. Two leading Ukrainian teams are registered here: Hockey Club Olympia-Kolos-Sequoia (HC OKS-SHVSM) and Dynamo-ShVSM-VDPU.

Vinnytsia is known for playing sports such as basketball. There are two professional teams: the women's Vinnytsia Lightnings and the men's Vinnytsia Bisons. The Vinnytsia Bisons are a household name in Vinnytsia and Ukrainian sports. This men's basketball team twice won silver medals and once bronze of the higher league of the championship of Ukraine in 2018.

In 2006, the first American football championship of Ukraine took place, in which Vinnytsia Wolves took second place. In 2013, 6 Wolves players were invited to be selected for the national American football team of Ukraine. Three of them became part of it. In 2014, the team started playing in the higher league, where they played in the group stage with Kyiv Bandits, Odesa Pirates, and Kyiv Vityaz. In 2017, they were silver medalists of the ULAF Championship of Ukraine. The youth teams of the Vinnytsia Wolves sports club, which formed the basis of two national flag football teams of Ukraine, became participants in the New Generation Bowl 2022 and returned home with achievements. The U15 national team won the silver cup of the tournament, and the U17 team won the bronze.

Vinnytsia Olympians

- Pavlo Khnykin – swimmer, two-time silver medalist of the 1992 Summer Olympics
- Inna Osypenko-Radomska – sprint kayaker, champion of the Olympic Games in Beijing, silver medalist at the Olympic Games in London in single kayak rowing (distance of 500 and 200 meters) and bronze medalist of the Olympic Games in Athens as part of the women's foursome, world champion in Poznan (Poland) K1 500 meters
- Hanna Balabanova – sprint canoeist, bronze medalist of the Olympic Games in Athens

Vinnytsia boxers

- Serhii Bohachuk – Vinnytsia boxer, WBC Continental Americas title holder

== Culture ==
Theaters of the city

- Vinnytsia State Academic Music and Drama Theater named after Mykola Sadovskyi, founded in 1910
- Vinnytsia Academic Regional Puppet Theater Zolotyi Kliuchyk – one of the oldest in Ukraine (founded in October 1938)
- Vinnytsia Regional Philharmonic named after Mykola Leontovych, founded in 1937

List of museums

- The National Pirogov's Estate Museum
- Vinnytsia Regional Museum of Local Lore
- Vinnytsia Regional Art Museum
- Military-historical Museum of the Air Force of the Armed Forces of Ukraine
- Vinnytsia Literary and Memorial Museum of Mykhailo Kotsiubynskyi
- Oleh Lutsyshyn Pottery Museum
- Vinnytsia Tram Museum
- AutoMotoVeloFotoTeleRadio Museum
- Museum of the Ukrainian postage stamp named after Yakiv Balaban
- Museum of transport models
- Holocaust Museum in Vinnytsia
- Museum of Jewish life

== Notable people ==
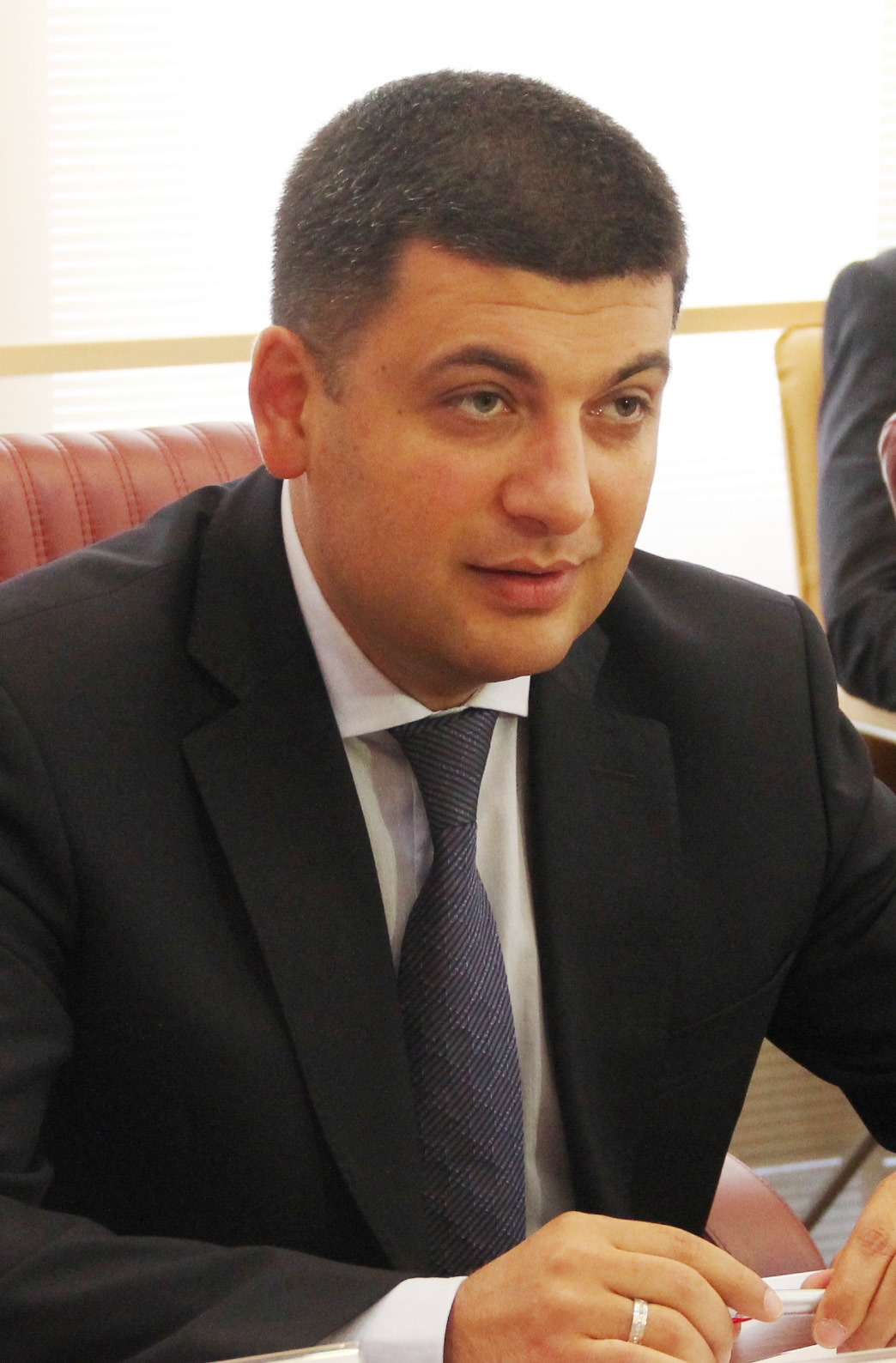
Volodymyr Groysman, 2012

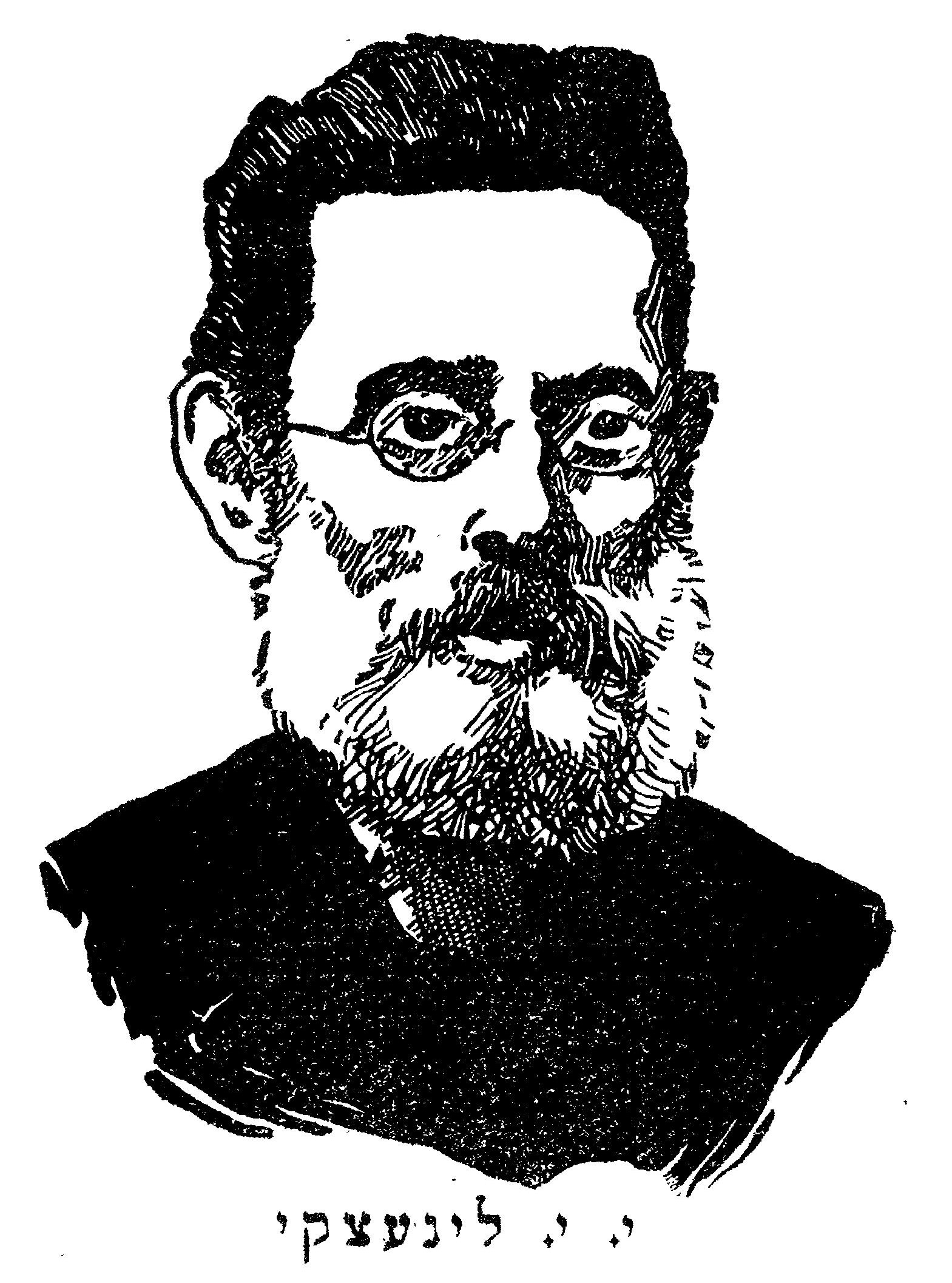
line-drawing portrait of Yitzkhok Yoel Linetzky, 1921

- Nathan Altman (1889–1970), Jewish and Soviet avant-garde artist, Cubist painter, stage designer and book illustrator
- Larysa Artiugina (born 1971), Ukrainian documentary film director and activist
- Sam Born (1891–1959), American businessman, candy maker and inventor of Peeps
- Matvei Petrovich Bronstein (1906–1938), theoretical physicist, a pioneer of quantum gravity
- Valeriy Chaly (born 1970), diplomat, ambassador of Ukraine to the US 2015–2019
- Todros Geller (1889–1949), Jewish American artist, teacher and master printmaker
- Volodymyr Groysman (born 1978), politician, Prime Minister of Ukraine 2016–2019
- Oleg Khoma (born 1966), translator and historian
- Victoria Koblenko (born 1980), Dutch actress, presenter and columnist
- Mykhailo Kotsiubynsky (1864–1913), author of novels and short stories; his home is a museum
- Volodymyr Kozhukhar (1941–2022), conductor and academic teacher
- Mykola Leontovych (1877–1921), Ukrainian composer who worked here
- Alexander Lerner (1913–2004), Soviet-Israeli cyberneticist and dissident
- Yuri Levada (1930–2006), sociologist, political scientist and the founder of the Levada Center
- Yitzkhok Yoel Linetzky (1839–1915), Yiddish language author and early Zionist
- Anatoly Lysenko (1937–2021), Soviet and Russian TV figure, journalist, director and producer
- Marina (born 1989), Polish singer of Ukrainian origin
- Jerzy Niezbrzycki (1902–1968), captain of the Polish Army
- Alla Pavlova (b. 1952), composer
- Nikolay Pirogov (1810–1881), originally from Moscow, Imperial Russian doctor, founder of field surgery, spent his later years in Vinnytsial his home is a museum
- Olya Polyakova (born 1979), Ukrainian singer, actress, TV presenter and comedian
- Maksym Shapoval (1978–2017), intelligence officer and head of special forces of the Ukrainian Chief Directorate of Intelligence, assassinated by Russian agents in 2017
- Vladyslav Skalsky (born 1976), Ukrainian civil servant and politician
- Olga Storozhenko (born 1992), Miss Ukraine Universe 2013 & Top 10 Miss Universe 2013
- Mykola Tochytskyi (born 1967), diplomat, politician and deputy Minister of Foreign Affairs
- Selman Waksman (1888–1973), American biochemist and microbiologist, Nobel prizewinner, born near Vinnytsia
- Inna Abramovna Zhvanetskaia (born 1937), composer, piano teacher and lecturer

=== Sport ===
- Aonishiki Arata (born 2004), sumo wrestler, the first Ukrainian to win a top division championship, and the second Ukrainian to reach the top division in Japanese sumo
- Serhiy Cherniavskiy (born 1976), cyclist, silver medallist at the 2000 Summer Olympics
- Sergey Fedorchuk (born 1981), Ukrainian Grandmaster chess player
- Pavlo Khnykin (born 1969), freestyle swimmer, team silver medallist at the 1992 Summer Olympics
- Illia Nyzhnyk (born 1996), Ukrainian chess grandmaster
- Sergei Polyakov (born 1968), Russian sport shooter, silver medallist at the 2004 Summer Olympics

== International relations ==
=== Twin towns – sister cities ===
Vinnytsia is twinned with:

Kielce, Poland; Peterborough, England, United Kingdom; Birmingham, Alabama, United States	Bursa, Turkey; Karlsruhe, Germany; Bat Yam, Israel	Panevėžys, Lithuania; Nancy, France

=== Partner cities ===
Vinnytsia also signed partnership agreements with these cities:

- (Poland) Lublin
- (Germany) Münster
- (Ukraine) Balakliia
- (Georgia (country)) Rustavi
- (Latvia) Ventspils
- (France) Dijon
- (North Macedonia) Vinica
- (Poland) Wyszków
- (Sweden) Helsingborg

== See also ==
- TIK
- Vinnytsia massacre
- Vinnytsia tram
- Werwolf (Wehrmacht HQ) – the codename used for one of Adolf Hitler's World War II Eastern Front military headquarters. It was one of the most easterly ever used by Hitler in person.
