= Nemanjić Dynasty: The Birth of the Kingdom =

Serbian TV series

- Serbian: Немањићи — Рађање Краљевине
- Genre: Historical drama; Serial drama
- Starring: Vojin Ćetković; Mladen Nelević; Sloboda Mićalović; Dubravka Mijatović
- Composer: Dragoljub Ilić
- Country of origin: Serbia
- Original language: Serbian
- No. of seasons: 1
- No. of episodes: 13

Production
- Executive producer: Miško Stevanović
- Running time: 45 minutes

Original release
- Network: Radio Television of Serbia
- Release: February 17, 2018 – present

Nemanjić Dynasty: The Birth оf The Kingdom (Serbian: Немањићи: Рађање Краљевине / Nemanjići: Rađanje Kraljevine) is a Serbian historical drama television series about the Serbian medieval dynasty Nemanjići. The pilot episode aired on 31 December in 2017., as a special episode for New Year’s Eve, and the series premiered on Radio Television of Serbia on 17 February 2018. After broadcasting the pilot episode, critics were mostly negative, especially about the language and anachronisms used in the episode, special effects, and acting.

== Series overview ==
| Season | Episodes | Originally aired | |
| Season | Episodes | First aired | Last aired |
|---|---|---|---|
| 1 | 13 | February 17, 2018 | May 6, 2018 |
| 2 | TBA | TBA | TBA |

== Roles ==
=== Real characters ===
| Actor | Role |
|---|---|
| Vojin Ćetković | Stefan the First-Crowned |
| Mladen Nelević | Stefan Nemanja |
| Dragan Mićanović | Rastko Nemanjić (Saint Sava) |
| Nebojša Glogovac | Vukan Nemanjić |
| Dubravka Mijatović | Ana Nemanjić |
| Igor Pervić | Isaac II Angelos |
| Slobodan Beštić | Alexios III Angelos |
| Aljoša Vučković | Raniero Dandolo |
| Jelena Gavrilović | Eudokia Angelina |
| Sloboda Mićalović | Anna Dandolo |
| Meto Jovanovski | Manuel I Komnenos |
| Radoje Čupić | Tihomir Zavidović |
| Jovan Torački | Stracimir Zavidović |
| Siniša Maksimović | Miroslav Zavidović |
| Aleksandar Đurica | Vojihna |
| Novak Bilbija | Frederick I Barbarossa |
| Zafir Hadžimanov | Theodore I Laskaris |
| Jelena Đukić | Кatalena |
| Aleksandar Dunić | Vuk |
| Andrej Šepetkovski | Strez |
| Dimitrije Ilić | Kaloyan |
| Atila Mes | Andrew II |
| Ljubomir Bulajić | Stojimir |
| Bogoljub Mitić | Ugljar |
| Olivera Viktorović | Ugljar's spouse |
| Dubravko Jovanović | Ban Kulin |
| Isidora Minić | Vojslava |
| Predrag Bjelac | Berthold |
| Đorđe Branković | Anastas |
| Milan Čučilović | Henry of Flanders |
| Zlata Numanagić | Stefan's aunt |
| Milan Marić | young Vukan Nemanjić |
| Miloš Đurović | young Stefan the First-Crowned |
| Nikola Mijatović | boy Stefan the First-Crowned |
| Stefan Radonjić | Stefan Radoslav |
| Tonja Gaćina | Komnena Nemanjić |
| Branislav Ćalić | Stefan Vladislav |
| Tanasije Uzunović | Antonije |
| Ivan Nikolić | |

=== Fictional characters ===
| Actor | Role |
|---|---|
| Nada Šargin | Raška Nemanjić |
| Miodrag Кrstović | Adam |
| Goran Sultanović | Prosigoj |
| Miroljub Lešo | Radoje |
| Milena Pavlović | Tisa |
| Vučić Perović | Bogdan |
| Ivan Zablaćanski | Bran |
| Luka Raco | Eudokia's lover |
| Jovana Gavrilović | young Raška Nemanjić |
