= Stefan Uroš I =

King of Serbia from 1243 to 1276

Saint Stefan Uroš I Стефан Урош I
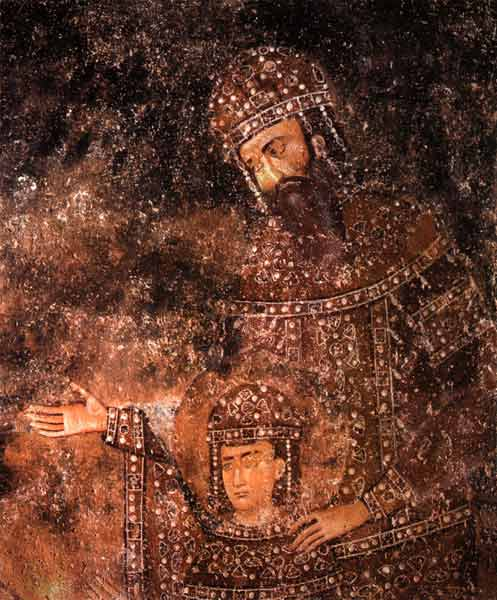
- A fresco at Sopoćani monastery, Serbia

Ktetor
- Born: c. 1223; Raška
- Died: 1 May 1277 (aged 53–54); Hum
- Venerated in: Eastern Orthodox Church

King of all Serbian and Maritime Lands
- Reign: 1243–1276
- Coronation: 1243
- Predecessor: Stefan Vladislav
- Successor: Stefan Dragutin
- Burial: Sopoćani monastery
- Spouse: Saint Helen of Serbia
- Issue: Stefan Dragutin; Stefan Uroš II Milutin; Brnjača; Stefan
- House: Nemanjić dynasty
- Father: Stefan Nemanjić
- Mother: Anna Dandolo
- Religion: Serbian Orthodox
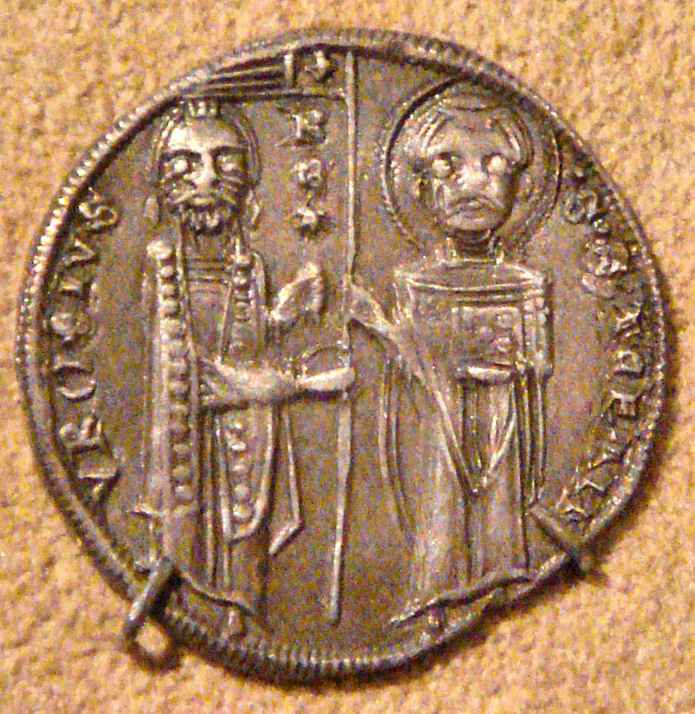
- Signature

Stefan Uroš I (Serbian Cyrillic: Стефан Урош I; c. 1223 – 1 May 1277), known as Uroš the Great (Serbian: Урош Велики, romanized: Uroš Veliki) was the King of Serbia from 1243 to 1276, succeeding his brother Stefan Vladislav. He was one of the most important rulers in Serbian history. During his reign the foundations were laid for the expansion of the Serbian medieval state, which would become an empire in the middle of the 14th century.

== Early life ==
Kingdom of Serbia during 13th and 14th centuries

Stefan Uroš was the youngest son of Stefan the First-Crowned and Anna, the granddaughter of Enrico Dandolo, Doge of Venice. He had two older half-brothers, on his father's side, kings Stefan Radoslav and Stefan Vladislav.

Scholars have argued that Bulgarian influence had been strong and unpopular, causing opposition that led to Vladislav's deposition after the death of Asen. The revolting nobility had chosen Uroš as their candidate for king; from 1242 to spring 1243, a war for the throne was fought, which ended with Vladislav being forced to give up the crown in favour of Uroš. It seems that Uroš captured Vladislav. The main resistance against Uroš was led by Vladislav's wife, Beloslava. The hostilities did not last long. Uroš was courteous towards Vladislav, gave him the administration of Zeta.

== Administration ==
At 25 years of age, he took the throne from his brother Vladislav, and despite not having support from in-laws as was the case with his brothers, he immediately ruled energetic and determined. Prior to his accession, the land had been looted by the Tatars and there were widespread internal conflicts; Uroš managed in a short time to resolve all important issues in the state and in its foreign policy.

The situation in Europe and in the Balkans were quite favourable for Serbia, which he very cleverly used for his benefit. During his reign Serbia significantly strengthened itself and progressed in every way. Uroš correctly determined the direction in political pretensions through penetrating the south in Macedonia and conflict with Hungary in Podunavlje. The land was politically and militarily prepared for serious politics and definitive fortification of Serbia and the Serb people in the Vardar valley and the middle Podunavlje. Apart from this, Uroš also correctly determined the direction of Serbian trade politics, as he on several occasions in his fight against the Republic of Ragusa wanted to eliminate Ragusan brokerage and exploitation in his state.

Particular significance in his domestic politics is that he strongly stressed the state principle above all else, and subordinated the churches (both Orthodox and Catholic) to state interests. He was instrumental in the definite solution to the conflict between the archbishoprics of Bar and Dubrovnik regarding power in Serbia, resolved in favour of Bar.

Uroš was the first to begin exploiting the mines, which would later become one of the main sources of material wealth and power of the Serbian state in the Middle Ages. As a first result of the opening of mines came the forging of Serbian coins, which he first minted on the Venetian model. He protected and assisted literature and writers; i.e. gave impetus to the preparation of a new, more comprehensive and ornate biography of his grandfather Nemanja, whom he fully modeled himself after.

King Uroš lived a modest patriarchal life, content within his family, in contrast to the splendor of the Byzantine court. He prided himself on modesty to the Byzantine deputies, which dominated at his court where everyone had to work.

In foreign policy Uroš skillfully used to his advantage the conflict between the Despotate of Epirus and the Empire of Nicaea, two Greek states, both of which sought to inherit the Byzantine Empire and take Constantinople from the Latin Empire. But when the Latin Empire fell, and Emperor Michael Palaiologos of Nicaea took Constantinople, Uroš began to coalite with his wife's cousin, Charles of Anjou, who wanted to recapture Constantinople, and through that alliance take as much Byzantine land as possible. Via Charles, who had family ties with the Hungarian kings, Uroš at the end of his reign also approached Hungary, with whom he long had been in a bad relation, and married his eldest son and heir, Stefan Dragutin, to Catherine, the daughter of Hungarian king Stephen V.

Pushed by his in-laws, with the help of the army he received from Hungary, Dragutin, unhappy with not getting more participation in the government, revolted and defeated his father and took over the throne. Uroš retired with his loyals to Hum, where, disappointed, dissatisfied and angry, he died soon thereafter.

== Economic development ==
=== Mining ===
Under Stefan Uroš I, Serbia became a significant power in the Balkans, partly due to economic development through opening of mines. The mines were developed by the "Sasi" (Saxons), who were experienced in the extracting of ore. Their settlements, located by the mines, had privileged status—they lived under their own laws and were allowed to adhere to Catholicism and build their churches. Important mines were located at Novo Brdo, Brskovo and Rudnik.

=== Trade ===
Economic prosperity was also fostered by the related intensification of trade with the Dalmatian cities of Dubrovnik and Kotor. The increase in the mining of silver and in trade naturally led to the introduction of larger quantities of royal coinage, modeled after the Venetian standard.

== Military operations ==
=== War with Ragusa ===
In 1252–1253, Uroš I was at war with the Republic of Ragusa, which bordered the Hum, which was held by his kinsman Radoslav Andrijić. Radoslav swore to fight Ragusa as long as it was in conflict with Serbia, at the same time boasting relations with Béla IV of Hungary. Ragusa took up an alliance with Bulgaria. Peace was ensured in a charter dated May 22, 1254, and the crisis ended.

During the second half of the 1260s a new war broke out with Ragusa, which was secretly favoured by the Serbian queen. A treaty was signed in 1268, specifying the amount of tribute that Dubrovnik was expected to contribute annually to the Serbian crown. The arrangement remained largely unbroken for the next century.

=== War with Hungary ===
In 1268 the Serbian king invaded the Hungarian possessions south of the Danube in Mačva, what is now western central Serbia. In spite of some initial success, Stefan Uroš was captured by the Hungarians and forced to purchase his release. A peace treaty was signed between the two kingdoms, and Stefan Uroš's son Stefan Dragutin of Serbia was married to Catherine, the daughter of the future king Stephen V of Hungary.

== Conflict with Dragutin ==
By the end of his reign, Stefan Uroš apparently succeeded in suppressing the autonomy of Hum, where the local princes became virtually indistinguishable from the rest of the nobility. In his effort to achieve centralization, the king appears to have alienated his eldest son by refusing to grant him an appanage. The conflict between father and son exacerbated, and the king apparently considered making his younger son, the future Stefan Milutin, his heir.

Worried about the inheritance and his very life, Stefan Dragutin finally demanded the throne in 1276. When Stefan Uroš refused, Dragutin rebelled and received help from his Hungarian relatives. The allies defeated the Serbian king and Stefan Uroš was forced to abdicate and retire to an unidentified monastery in Hum where he died a year or two later. His remains were later moved to his monastic foundation of Sopoćani.

== Endowments ==
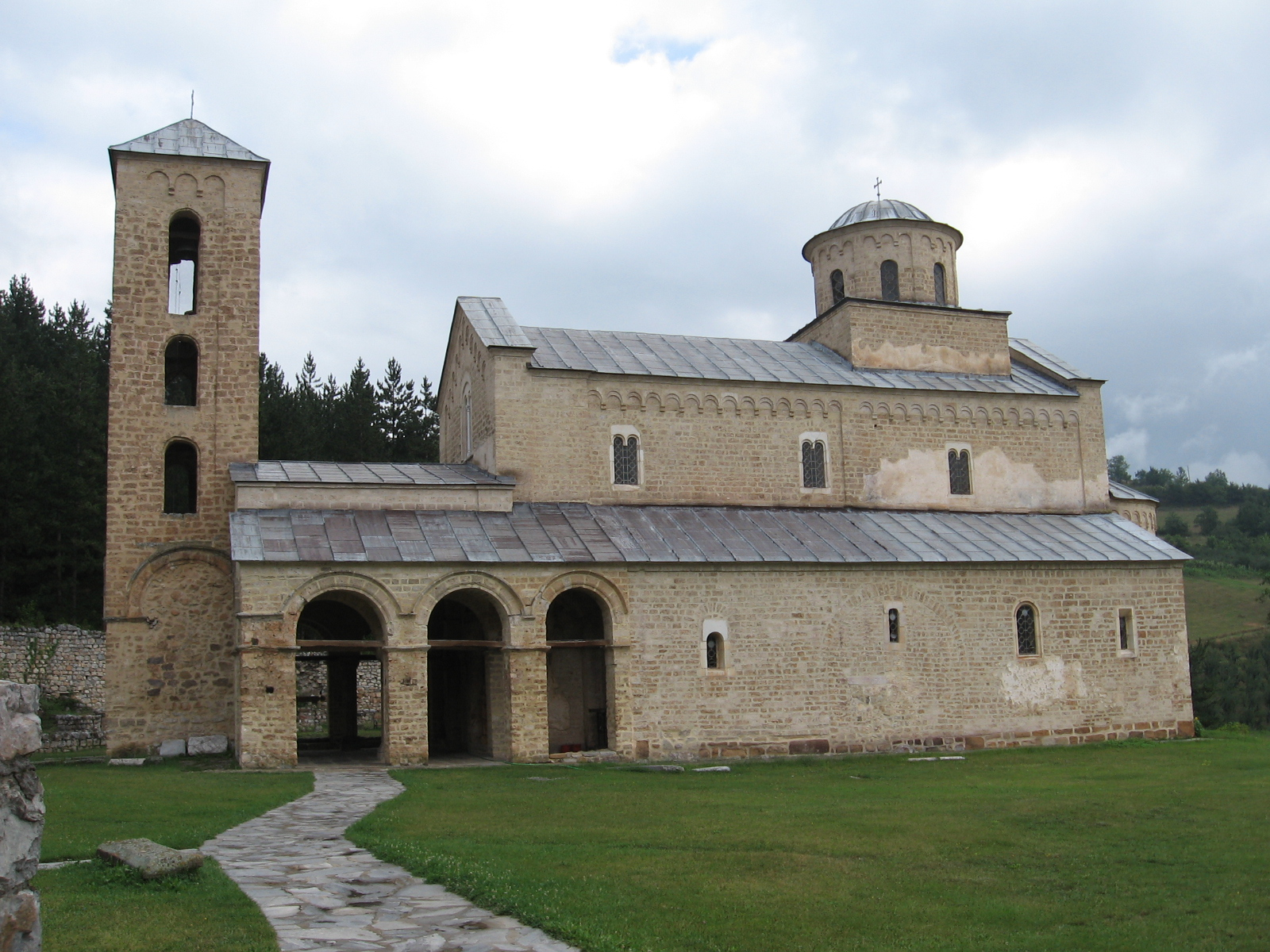
Sopoćani Monastery

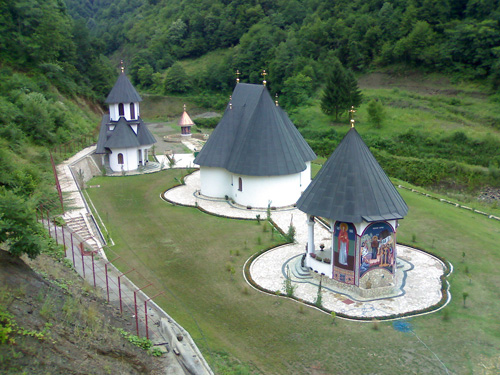
Sase Monastery

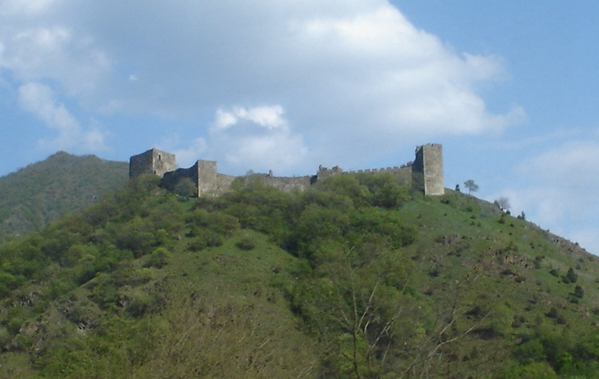
Maglič

== Family ==
King Uroš was married to Helen (d. 1314), a distant cousin of king Charles I of Naples. Various earlier researchers thus believed that Helen herself was a scion of the Capetian House of Anjou. On that assumption, they coined and often used the term: Helen of Anjou (Serbian Cyrillic: Јелена Анжујска / Jelena Anžujska). Contrary to that, newer scholarly analyses have shown that Helen was not an Angevin princess, but various genealogical questions related to her real ancestry and family ties are still considered as unresolved.

King Uroš I and queen Helen had at least three children:

- Stefan Dragutin, who succeeded as king
- Stefan Milutin, who succeeded as king in 1282
- Brnjača, a daughter

== Ancestry ==
Ancestors of Stefan Uroš I

8. Zavida
4. Stefan Nemanja
2. Stefan the First-Crowned
5. Anastasia of Serbia
1. Stefan Uroš I
12. Enrico Dandolo
6. Raniero Dandolo
3. Anna Dandolo

== Annotations ==
1. He is also known by his epithet Veliki (Велики), "the Great", and Hrapavi (Храпави), "the Rugged" or "the Rough".

== Sources ==
- Angold, Michael (2011). "The Latin Empire of Constantinople, 1204–1261: Marriage Strategies". Identities and Allegiances in the Eastern Mediterranean after 1204. Farnham: Ashgate Publishing Limited. pp. 47–68.
- Bataković, Dušan T., ed. (2005). Histoire du peuple serbe [History of the Serbian People] (in French). Lausanne: L’Age d’Homme. ISBN 9782825119587.
- Ćirković, Sima (2004). The Serbs. Malden: Blackwell Publishing. ISBN 9781405142915.
- Curta, Florin (2006). Southeastern Europe in the Middle Ages, 500–1250. Cambridge: Cambridge University Press. ISBN 9780521815390.
- Curta, Florin (2019). Eastern Europe in the Middle Ages (500–1300). Leiden and Boston: Brill. ISBN 9789004395190.
- Dvornik, Francis (1962). The Slavs in European History and Civilization. New Brunswick: Rutgers University Press. ISBN 9780813507996.
- Erdeljan, Jelena (2024). "Queen Helen of Serbia: Catholic Noblewoman - Orthodox Queen". Portraits of Medieval Europe, 800–1400. New York: Routledge. pp. 201–210.
- Fine, John Van Antwerp Jr. (1994) [1987]. The Late Medieval Balkans: A Critical Survey from the Late Twelfth Century to the Ottoman Conquest. Ann Arbor, Michigan: University of Michigan Press. ISBN 0472082604.
- Ivanović, Miloš (2019). "Serbian Hagiographies on the Warfare and Political Struggles of the Nemanjić Dynasty (from the Twelfth to Fourteenth Century)". Reform and Renewal in Medieval East and Central Europe: Politics, Law and Society. Cluj-Napoca: Romanian Academy, Center for Transylvanian Studies. pp. 103–129.
- Jireček, Constantin (1911). Geschichte der Serben. Vol. 1. Gotha: Perthes.
- Jireček, Constantin (1918). Geschichte der Serben. Vol. 2. Gotha: Perthes.
- Kalić, Jovanka (2017). "The First Coronation Churches of Medieval Serbia". Balcanica (48): 7–18. doi:10.2298/BALC1748007K. hdl:21.15107/rcub_dais_4886.
- Madgearu, Alexandru (2017). The Asanids: The Political and Military History of the Second Bulgarian Empire (1185–1280). Leiden-Boston: Brill. ISBN 9789004333192.
- Marjanović-Dušanić, Smilja (2006). "Lʹ idéologie monarchique dans les chartes de la dynastie serbe des Némanides (1168–1371): Étude diplomatique". Archiv für Diplomatik: Schriftgeschichte, Siegel- und Wappenkunde. 52: 149–158. doi:10.7788/afd.2006.52.jg.149. S2CID 96483243.
- McDaniel, Gordon L. (1984). "On Hungarian-Serbian Relations in the Thirteenth Century: John Angelos and Queen Jelena" (PDF). Ungarn-Jahrbuch. 12 (1982–1983): 43–50.
- McDaniel, Gordon L. (1986). "The House of Anjou and Serbia". Louis the Great: King of Hungary and Poland. Boulder: East European Monographs. pp. 191–200. ISBN 9780880330879.
- Mileusnić, Slobodan (1998). Medieval Monasteries of Serbia (4th ed.). Novi Sad: Prometej. ISBN 9788676393701.
- Ostrogorsky, George (1956). History of the Byzantine State. Oxford: Basil Blackwell.
- Porčić, Nebojša (2021). "Documents of Mary of Cayeux concerning grants to the Abbey of Dommartin and an agreement with the king of England". Initial: A Review of Medieval Studies. 9: 181–208.
- Samardžić, Radovan; Duškov, Milan, eds. (1993). Serbs in European Civilization. Belgrade: Nova, Serbian Academy of Sciences and Arts, Institute for Balkan Studies. ISBN 9788675830153.
- Van Tricht, Filip (2020). "Latin Emperors and Serbian Queens Anna and Helena: Genealogical and Geopolitical Explorations in the Post-1204 Byzantine World". Frankokratia. 1 (1–2): 56–107.
- Živković, Vojislav (2021). Serbian Kings Dragutin and Milutin. The Problem of the Succession of the Serbian Throne at the End of the 13th and Beginning of the 14th Century. Niš & Vranje: Centar za crkvene studije; Svepravoslavno društvo Prepodobni Justin Ćelijski i Vranjski. ISBN 978-86-84105-59-4.

Stefan Uroš I Nemanjić dynasty Born: 1223 Died: 1 May 1277
Regnal titles
Preceded by Stefan Vladislav	King of Serbia; 1243–1276	Succeeded by Stefan Dragutin
