= Maglic =

Maglic may refer to:

- Maglič
- Maglić
