= Saint Nicholas Church, Vinnytsia =

Saint Nicholas church
- Микільська церква
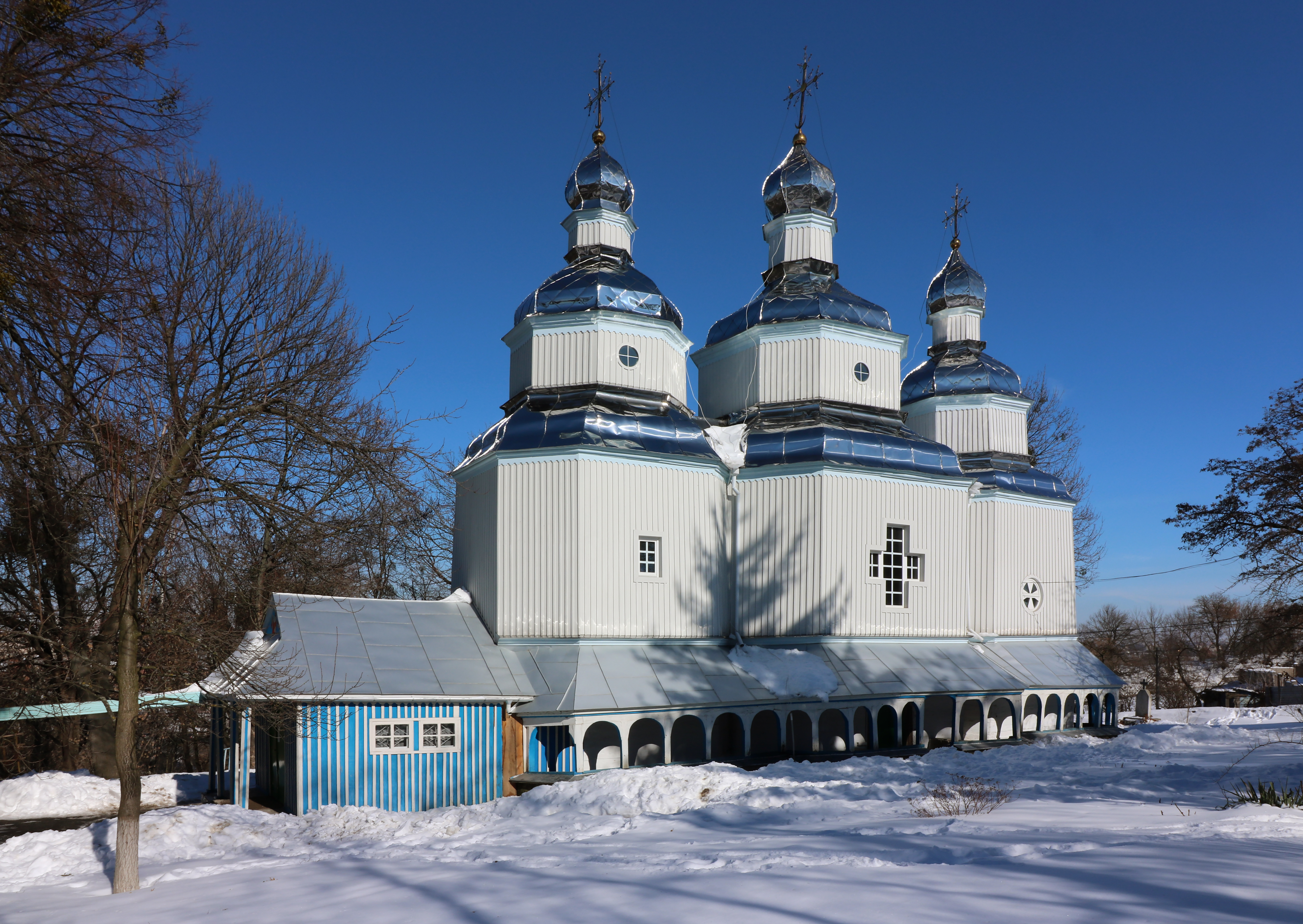
- Saint Nicholas church
- 49°13′34″N 28°28′13″E
- Location: Vinnytsia
- Country: Ukraine
- Denomination: Eastern Orthodox Church

Architecture
- Completed: April 11, 1746

Administration
- Diocese: Vinnytsia diocese

Immovable Monument of National Significance of Ukraine
- Official name: Миколаївська церква та дзвіниця (дер.) в Старому місті (Saint Nicholas Church and its bell tower (wooden) in the Old City)
- Type: Architecture
- Reference no.: 020032

Saint Nicholas Church (Ukrainian: Микільська церква or Миколаївська церква) is an Eastern Orthodox church on the left bank of the Southern Bug river in Vinnytsia, Ukraine.

According to the historical documents, six Orthodox churches were open in Vinnytsia before 1552. Presumably, Saint Nicholas church was founded by ktetor Anton Postelnik and constructed in the place of a more ancient one. Legends has it that Kyiv-Pechersk monks fleeing from the Mongols were the builders. The church was designed in a typical Ukrainian style as three log cabins with blunt angles. The construction has no nails. At that time churches were still defense objects, that is why its bell tower was moved aside to the stone gray wall and in case of siege could be used as a fortress.

== The architecture of the church ==
The church is a three-story, three-domed, "with a porch" (open gallery), on a stone foundation, made of oak beams. The church is located, like all Ukrainian churches, from west to east. All three church log cabins are octagonal in plan. A rectangular narthex is attached to the western log house. The narthex is connected to the central part by a wide arch. The floor of the central log house is higher than the floor in the Babynets. The church domes inside the church are built in the form of a tent, and have rounded edges on the outside. Each log house is an independent tower with three tiers. The church is sheathed with longitudinal boards painted blue inside and out.

== See also ==
- Wooden churches in Ukraine
