= Duljevo monastery =

Serbian Orthodox monastery

Coordinates: 42.2776°N 18.9138°E

The Duljevo monastery (Serbian: манастир Дуљево) is a Serbian Orthodox monastery dating to the 14th century located in Kuljače in south Montenegro. It includes a church dedicated to St. Stephen. It is situated on the foothills of the Paštrovo mountain at a height of 450m, overlooking the seaside Budva. It is known for the fresco ktetor (founder) portrait of Serbian Emperor Stefan Dušan (r. 1331–55), in which he holds the model of the church. It is believed to have been founded by Stefan Dušan. According to some, it was his father, king Stefan Dečanski (r. 1322–31), who founded the church. It is believed to be the church that later Serbian Patriarch Arsenije III (s. 1674–90) took monastic vows in. It was a metochion of Visoki Dečani. It was mentioned in a 1706 Russian anthology that was sent to Montenegrin metropolitan Danilo in 1715. The monastery was burnt and destroyed by Ottoman Albanian troops, headed by Mahmud Pasha Bušatlija, in the Scutari invasion of Montenegro (1785). It was looted by Fascist forces in June 1941 during World War II.

== See also ==
- Praskvica Monastery
- Reževići Monastery
- Podmaine Monastery

== Sources ==
- Удружење књижевника Црне Горе (1974). Стварање. Vol. 7–12. Удружење књижевника Црне Горе.
- Dragić Kijuk, Predrag R. (1992). Српска хроника на светским веригама. Ibarske novosti. ISBN 978-86-81341-04-9.
- Vukmanović, Jovan L. (1960). Паштровићи: антропогеографско-етнолошка испитивања. Obod.
- Српска патријаршија (2007). Православље. Vol. 955–978. Издаје Српска патријаршија.
