= Anastasia of Serbia =

Saint Anastasia of Serbia
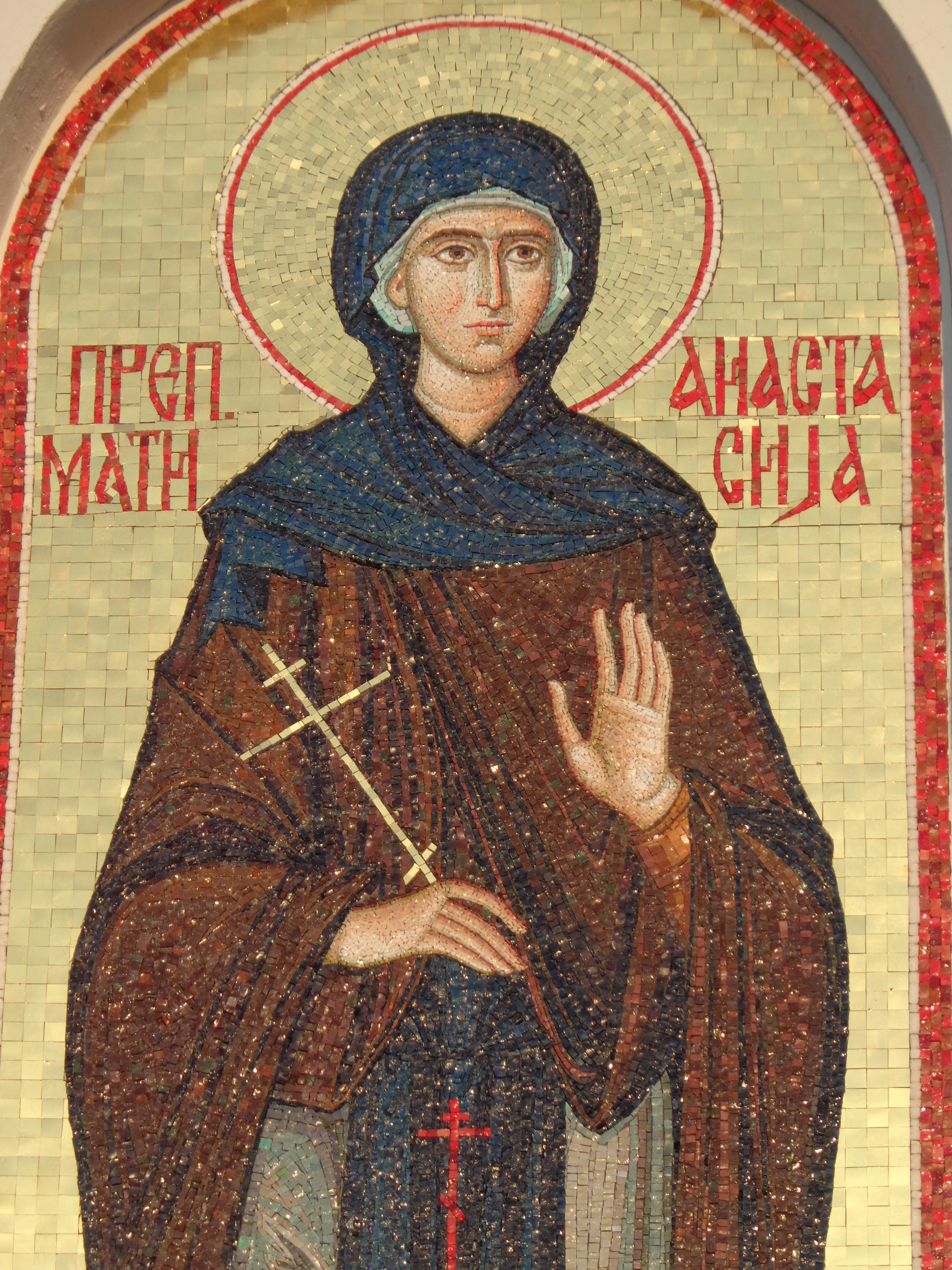
- Mosaic of St. Anastasia in the Church of Saint Simeon the Myrrh-streaming

Venerable Mother
- Venerated in: Eastern Orthodox Church
- Major shrine: Studenica Monastery
- Feast: 4 July [O.S. 21 June]
- Attributes: Monastic vestments, cross

Grand Princess consort of Serbia
- Tenure: fl. 1166–1196
- Died: 21 July 1200
- Burial: Studenica Monastery
- Spouses: Stefan Nemanja
- House: Nemanjić dynasty (by marriage)

Ana (Serbian: Ана); fl. 1196 – died 22 June 1200) was the princess consort of the Serbian Principality as the wife of Stefan Nemanja (r. 1166–1196). Ana took monastic vows in 1196 and was tonsured as Anastasija (Анастасија), after Anastasia of Sirmium.

She is venerated as a saint in the Eastern Orthodox Church, especially in the Serbian Orthodox Church, where she is known as Saint Anastasia (Serbian: Света Анастасија, romanized: Sveta Anastasija). Her feast day is commemorated on 21 June (on the Julian calendar).

== Life ==
There has been various theories on her origin, however, these remain guesses rather than scientifically based. The hagiographies on St. Simeon (Stefan Nemanja) do not mention his direct ancestors nor childhood, nor the origin of Ana. The details of the wedding were also left out in the hagiographies. Archbishop Sava, the son of Nemanja and Ana, spoke of her as the only wife of Nemanja, which some historians however doubt. She is mentioned only in some shorter passages in the hagiographies. Her character is depicted as humble and pious, and medieval writers show admiration to her personality and actions. Her son Stefan presented her with Biblical features: "An honorable wife in her husband's house more valuable than pearls and precious stones", and emphasized her traits of obedience and kindness which are also characteristic of biblical heroines.

Ana participated in her husband's renovation of the Monastery of the Theotokos, as mentioned by their son Stefan. Nemanja built and renovated (as ktetor) several monasteries and churches in the Toplica region in 1164–1166 after meeting with Byzantine emperor Manuel I Komnenos in Niš in 1164. Ana was an overseer of the monastery, which means it was likely a nunnery. As Nemanja, Ana was presented as the ktetor of the monastery.

Nemanja and Ana took monastic vows together, as Simeon and Anastasija, respectively. According to Sava, Anastasija went to the Monastery of the Theotokos "in Ras", which is either the one in Toplica or another one in the zemlja (province) of Raška. A later charter of Studenica mentions Pridvorica near Studenica as the place where she stayed as nun.

She was buried at Studenica. Above her reliquary, a fresco depicting her praying was painted in the 16th century, likely painted over an older fresco with the same composition. Her date of death was 21 July according to the Studenica Typikon, however, the date inscribed in the Hilandar Typikon, 21 June, was accepted as her feast day, despite her cult originating from Studenica.

== Issue ==
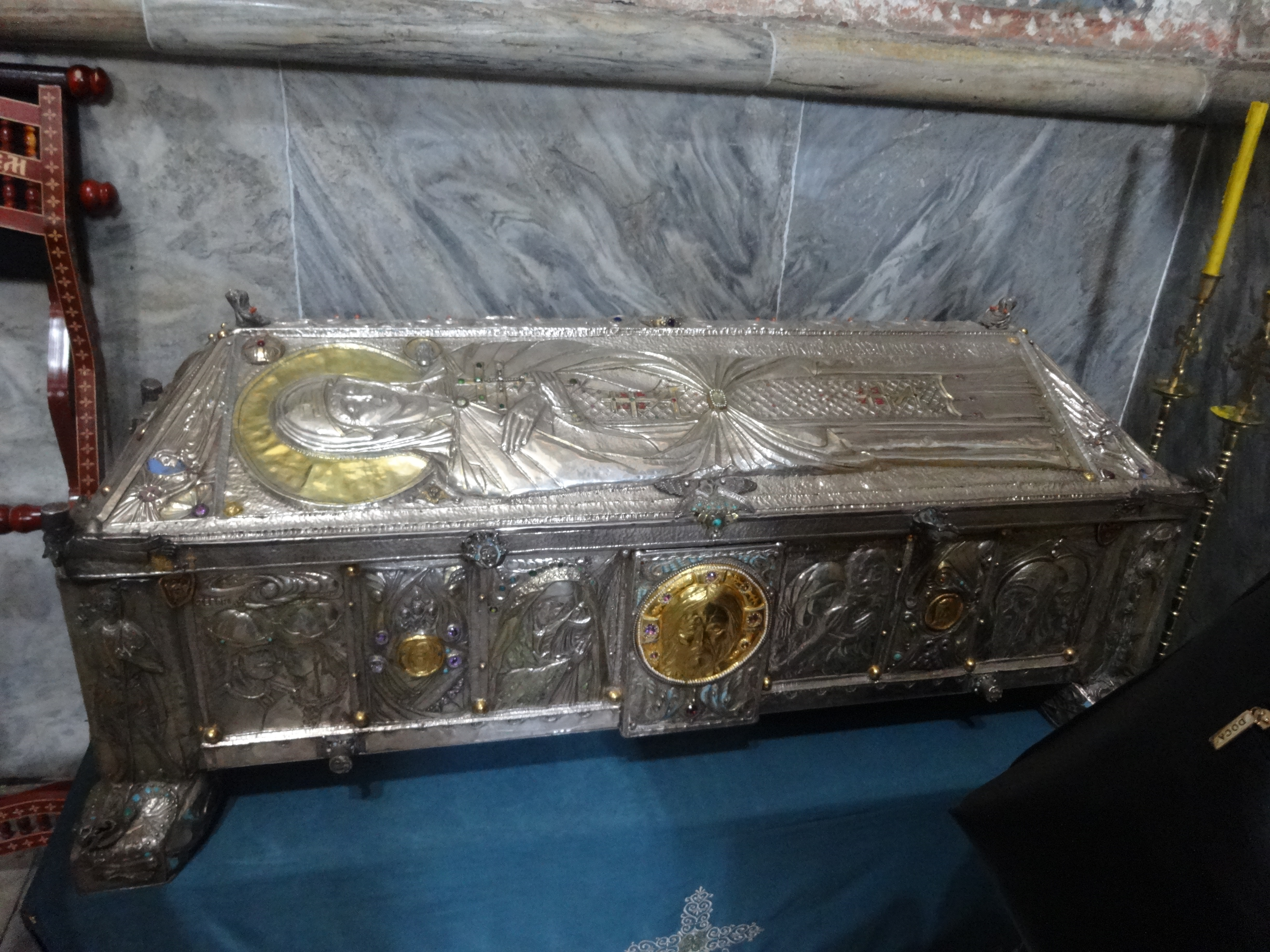
The reliquary containing St. Anastasia's relics in Studenica Monastery

Through her marriage with Stefan Nemanja, they had three sons and three daughters:

- Stefan Nemanjić (c. 1165–1228), Stefan Nemanja's successor.
- Rastko Nemanjić (Saint Sava) (1169/1174–1235/1236), the founder and first archbishop of the Serbian Orthodox Church.
- Vukan Nemanjić, Grand Prince of Duklja (r. 1190–1208) and Grand Prince of Serbia (r. 1202–1204)
- Jefimija, who married Manuel Doukas, regent of Thessaloniki (c. 1187 – c. 1241)
- A daughter who married Tihomir Asen, and gave birth to Bulgarian Tsar Constantine Tih Asen (r. 1257–1277)

== See also ==
- Nemanjić family tree
- List of Serbian saints
- List of Serbian consorts

== Annotations ==
1. Mavro Orbini (1601), mentioned her as a daughter of the Ban of Bosnia, who historians therefore identified with Ban Borić and his daughter (as per J. Rajić) or sister (as per V. Glušac). Simeon Bogdanović–Siniša claimed that Ana was the daughter of Ban Borić, however, he wrongly thought that Borić and Boris Kalamanos were the same person (when in fact, Boris died in 1154, and Borić was alive in 1163), thus Ana, based on this assumption, would have been the daughter of Boris. Justin Popović believed her to have been the daughter of Manuel I Komnenos, who after the conflict with Uroš II of Serbia wed his daughter to Stefan Nemanja in order to uphold peace. Other theories include her being a Hungarian princess or "Frankish" (French) princess.

== Sources ==
- Predrag Puzović (1998). "GOSPOĐA ANA, NEZNANOG POREKLA". SRPSKO NASLEĐE - ISTORIJSKE SVESKE - BROJ 5 - MAJ 1998. NIP „GLAS“.
- Koprivica, Marija (2024). "Ана - монахиња Анастасија у српским средњовековним житијима". Мнололетна писања сабрасмо у једно – via Academia.edu.
- Vukićević, Milenko M.; Ćosović, Stevo (2005). Znamenite žene i vladarke srpske. Svet knjige. ISBN 978-86-7396-106-4.

Royal titles
Unknown Last known title holder: Ana	Princess consort of Serbia; 1166–1196	Succeeded by Eudokia Angelina
