= Maglić =

Maglić may refer to:

- Maglić, Serbia, a village in Vojvodina
- Maglić (mountain), a mountain situated in Bosnia, Herzegovina and Montenegro
- Mountain Maglić, a mountain in Montenegro
- Bogdan Maglić, Serbian American physicist

== See also ==
- Maglič, a castle in Serbia
