= Pridvorica Monastery =

12th-century monastery in Serbia

Coordinates: 43°28′33″N 20°22′46″E

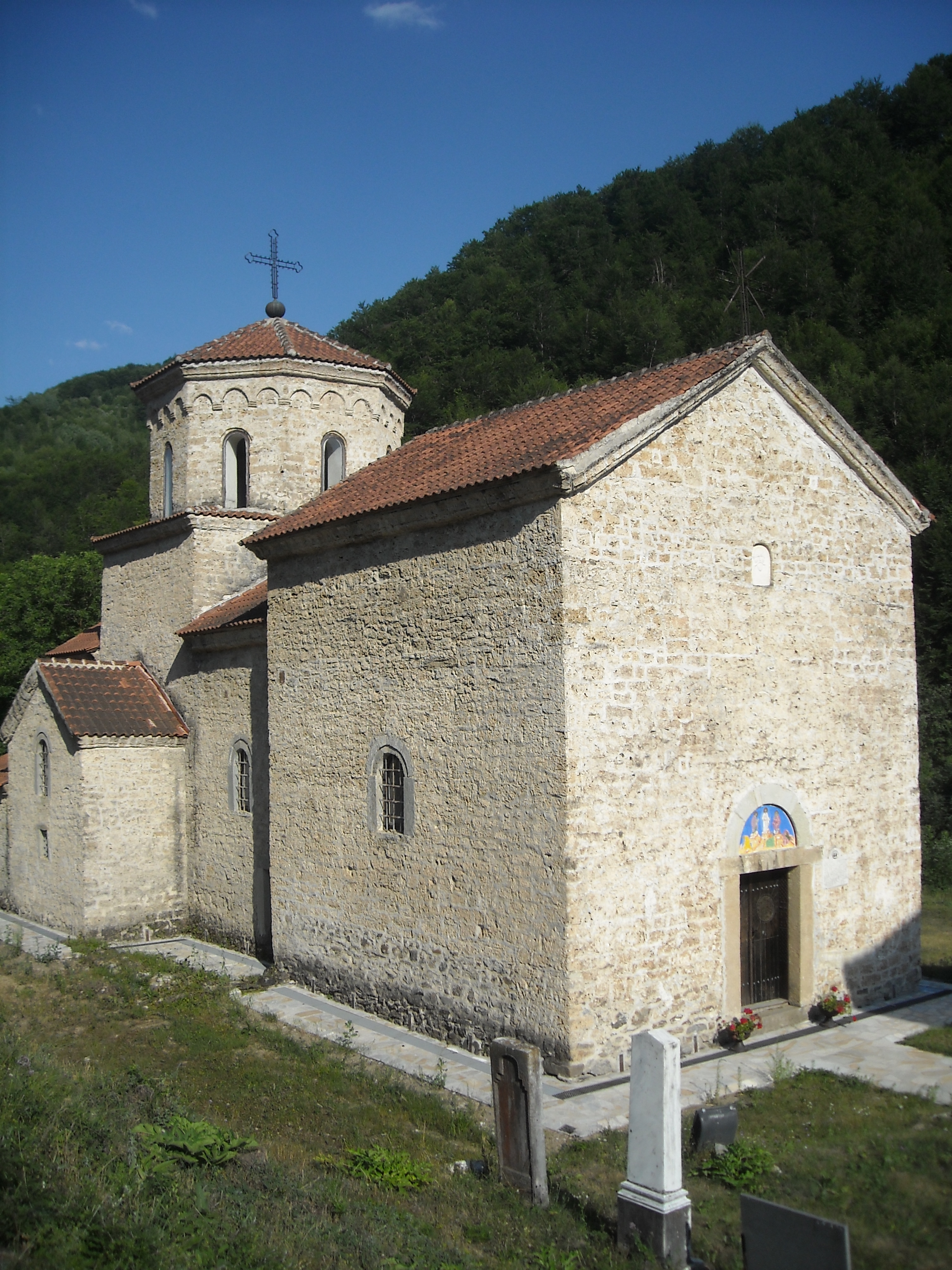
- The Monastery of Pridvorica
- Interactive map of Pridvorica Monastery

Monastery information
- Full name: Манастир Придворица
- Order: Serbian Orthodox
- Established: 12th century Renovated in 1557, 1835
- Diocese: Žiča Diocese

People
- Founder: Saint Sava

Site
- Location: Pridvorica, Ivanjica, Serbia

The Pridvorica Monastery (Serbian: Манастир Придворица, romanized: Manastir Pridvorica) is a monastery of the Serbian Orthodox Church, built in the 12th century, at the same time as the nearby Studenica. It has the status of cultural monument of great importance. It is located in the village of Pridvorica, Ivanjica.

According to the architectural characteristics it is a typical example of medieval Raška school. Church of the Transfiguration is a single-nave, one-dome building with a semicircular apse at the east. The external facade is decorated with a frieze of blind arcades.

It was built by a servant who worked at the court of Nemanjićs around 1195. Hence the name Pridvorica. A testimony of this are minor, but valuable remains of frescoes in the upper reaches of the temple. Initially this was a nunnery, which is confirmed by Nemanja's charter to the monastery of Studenica. The nuns were engaged in weaving and were passing the skills to the local population, as evidenced by a fully authentic style of weaving in this region; it was then the local Church for centuries, and since 2007 it was again declared the monastery, but a male one. Abbot of the monastery, and two novices live in the monastery. Pridvorica is on the 28th kilometer of road from Ivanjica to Studenica.

The building itself was twice renewed, which in many ways changed its exterior: for the first time after 1557, and the second time in mid-nineteenth century. During the second renewal, an iconostasis was painted at the gates, signed by Sreten Protić Molerović 1835. Pridvorica monastery church is dedicated to the Transfiguration. The monastery is one of the few in Serbia who have their own Coat of arms.

== Gallery ==
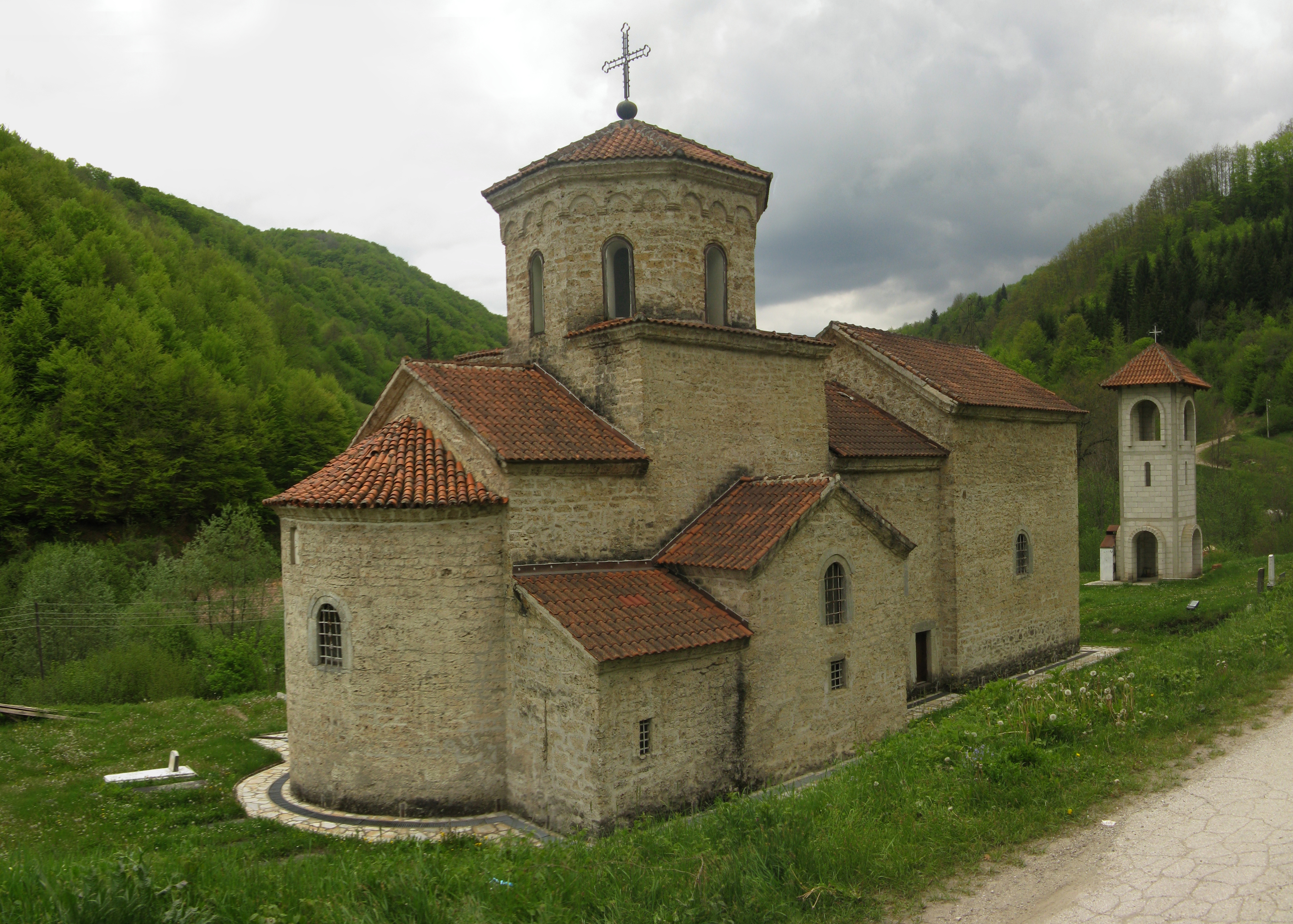
The Church of Holy Transfiguration in Pridvorica

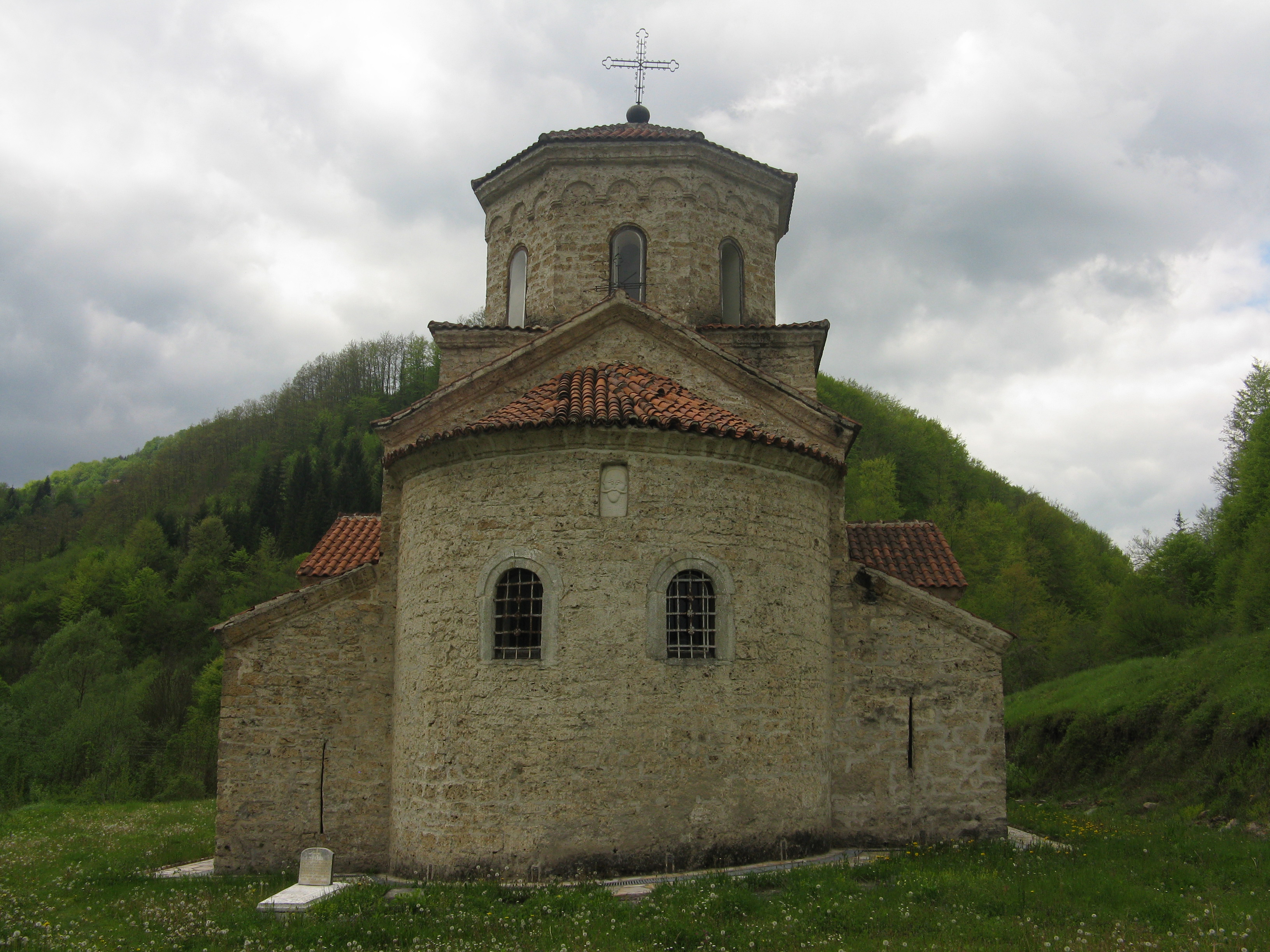
West side of the church

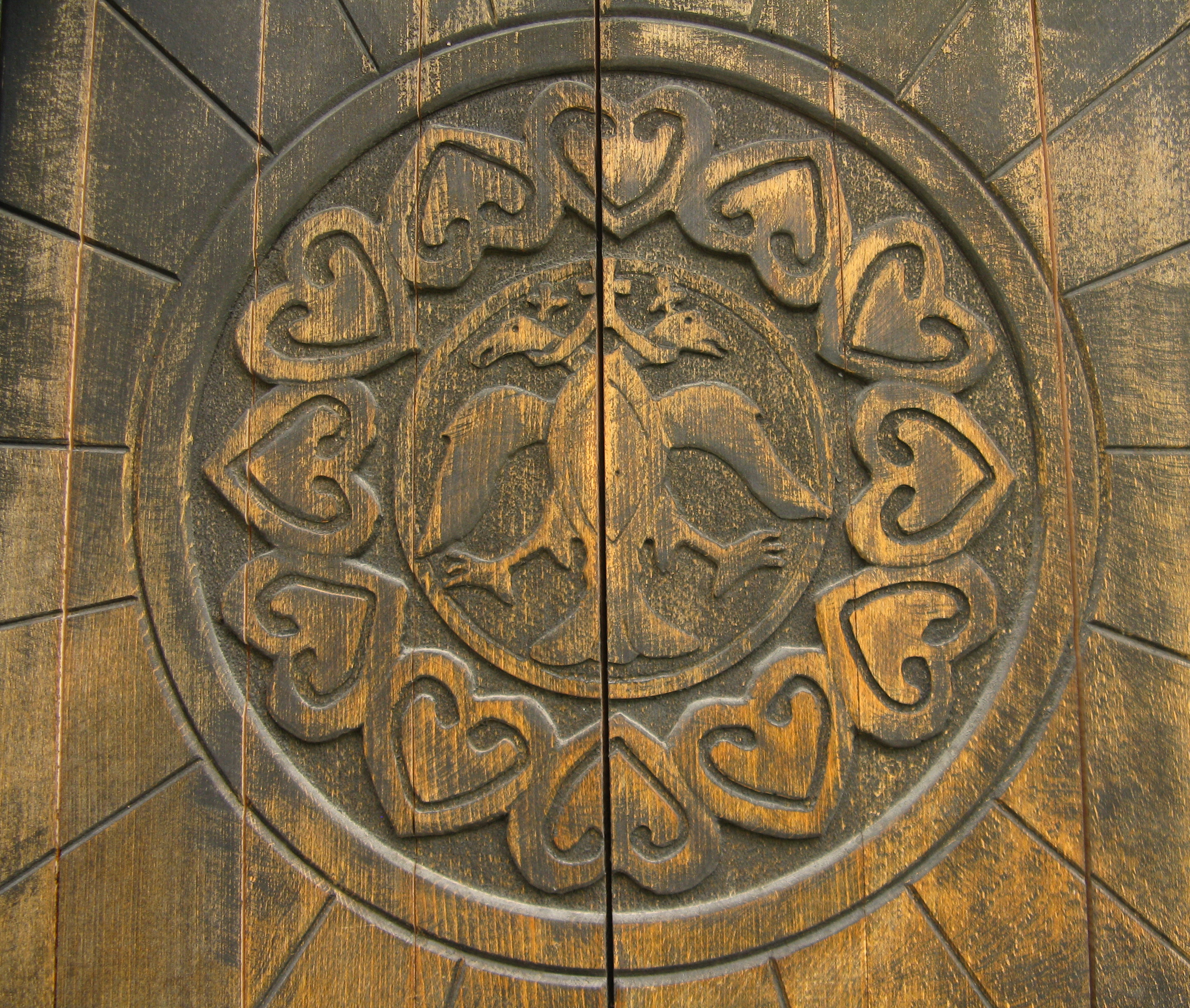
The coat of arms of Pridvorica monastery

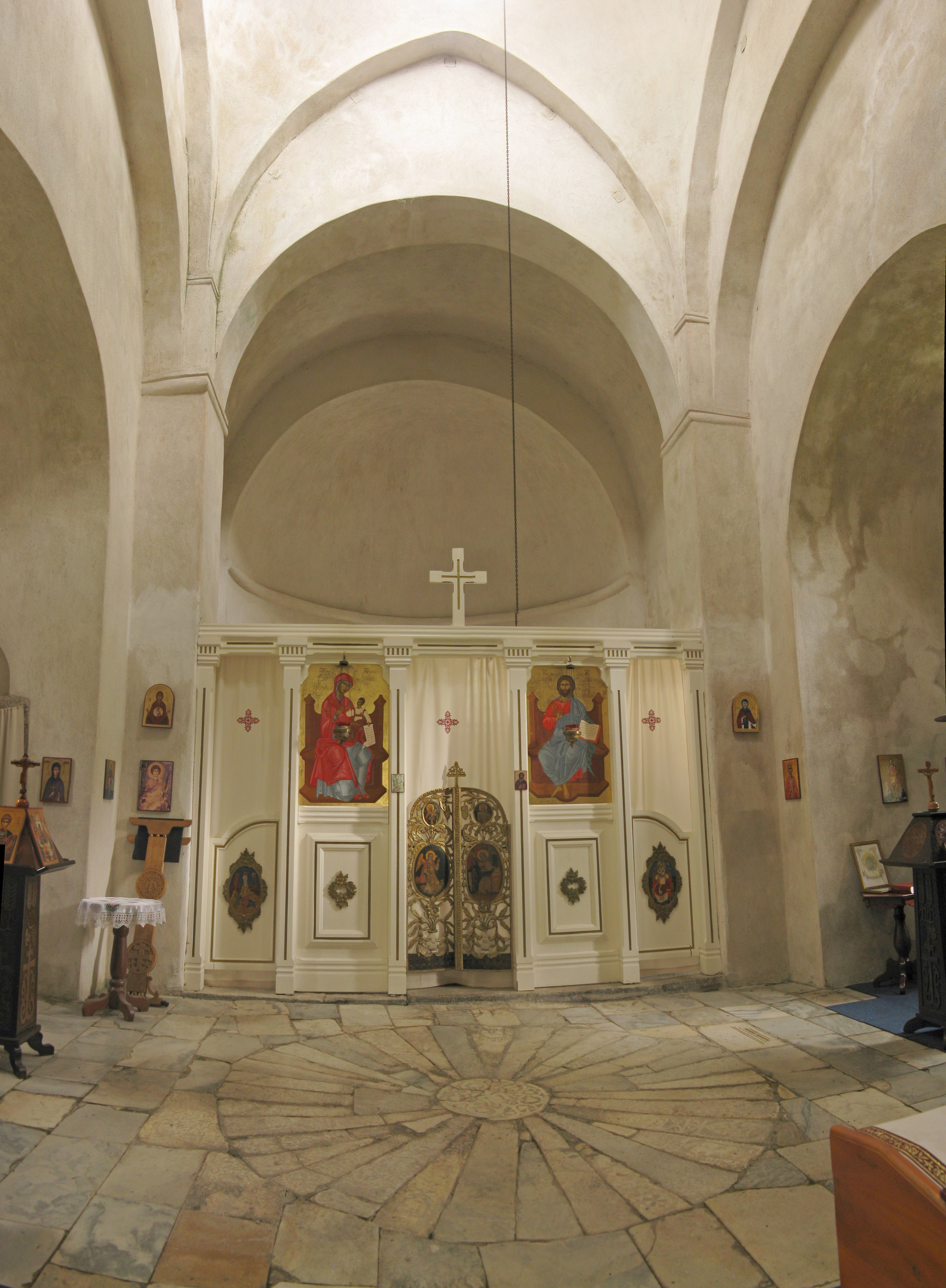
Interior of the church with the white iconostasis
