= Eudokia Angelina =

Grand Princess consort of Serbia
- Tenure: 1196 – c. 1201

Empress consort of the Byzantine Empire
- Tenure: c. 1204
- Died: c. 1211
- Spouse: Stefan the First-Crowned; Alexios V Doukas; Leo Sgouros
- Issue: Stefan Radoslav; Stefan Vladislav; Sava II; Komnena, Princess Consort of Arbanon
- House: Angelid dynasty
- Father: Alexios III Angelos
- Mother: Euphrosyne Doukaina Kamaterina

Eudokia Angelina (Greek: Ευδοκία Αγγελίνα, also spelled Eudocia, Serbian: Evdokija Anđel; around 1173–died c. 1211, or later) was the consort of Stefan the First-Crowned of Serbia from c. 1190 to c. 1200. She later remarried, to Alexios V Doukas, who briefly ruled as Emperor of Byzantium in 1204. She was a daughter of Alexios III Angelos and Euphrosyne Doukaina Kamatera.

== Life ==
Eudokia first married Stefan, the second son of Stefan Nemanja, Grand Župan of Serbia. The marriage was arranged by her uncle, the emperor Isaac II Angelos, around 1190, while her father was in exile in Syria. In 1196, on her father-in-law's retirement to a monastery, Eudokia's husband became ruler of Serbia. According to the Byzantine historian Nicetas Choniates, Stefan and Eudokia quarrelled and separated, accusing one another of adultery, and therefore in 1200 or 1201, Eudokia was banished from Serbia. Eudokia fled on foot with only the clothes on her back, seeking refuge at the court of Stefan's brother Vukan, ruler of Zeta, who befriended and provided for her. When she recovered, Eudokia went to Dyrrachium, from where a Byzantine ship returned her to her father in Constantinople. The repudiation of Eudokia shows the decline of Byzantine power and prestige.

In Constantinople Eudokia became the mistress of the future Alexios V Doukas, with whom she (and her mother) fled the city into Thrace on April 12, 1204, as the Crusaders of the Fourth Crusade were storming the city. Reaching her deposed father at Mosynopolis, Eudocia was allowed to marry Alexios V, but he was arrested and mutilated on the orders of Alexios III. Eudokia was furious with her father's actions. Later, Alexios was captured by Crusader forces and eventually forced to retire to a monastery.

Eudokia married for a third time, to Leo Sgouros, the independent ruler of Corinth, after he offered asylum to Alexios III and his family in 1204. Blockaded in the citadel of Corinth, Leo Sgouros committed suicide in 1207/1208. Eudokia is thought to have died around 1211.

By her marriage to Stefan of Serbia she had four children:

- Stefan Radoslav, King of Serbia (1228-1234)
- Stefan Vladislav, King of Serbia from 1234 to 1243
- Sava II, Archbishop of the Serbian Orthodox Church, serving from 1263 until his death in 1271
- Komnena Nemanjić

== See also ==
- List of Byzantine emperors
- List of Roman and Byzantine Empresses

== Sources ==
- Ćirković, Sima (2004). The Serbs. Malden: Blackwell Publishing. ISBN 9781405142915.
- Fine, John Van Antwerp Jr. (1994) [1987]. The Late Medieval Balkans: A Critical Survey from the Late Twelfth Century to the Ottoman Conquest. Ann Arbor, Michigan: University of Michigan Press. ISBN 0472082604.
- Varzos, Konstantinos (1984). Η Γενεαλογία των Κομνηνών [The Genealogy of the Komnenoi] (PDF) (in Greek). Vol. B. Thessaloniki: Centre for Byzantine Studies, University of Thessaloniki.
- Kazhdan, Alexander, ed. (1991). The Oxford Dictionary of Byzantium. Oxford and New York: Oxford University Press. ISBN 0-19-504652-8.
- O city of Byzantium: annals of Niketas Choniates tr. Harry J. Magoulias (Detroit: Wayne State University Press, 1984).
- Mihailo Laskaris (1926), Byzantine Princesses in Medieval Serbia

Eudokia Angelina Angelid dynasty Died: c. 1211
Royal titles
Preceded by Anastasija as grand princess	Grand Princess consort of Serbia; 1196–1198	Succeeded by Anna Dandolo as queen
