= Reževići Monastery =

Serbian Orthodox monastery near Budva, Montenegro

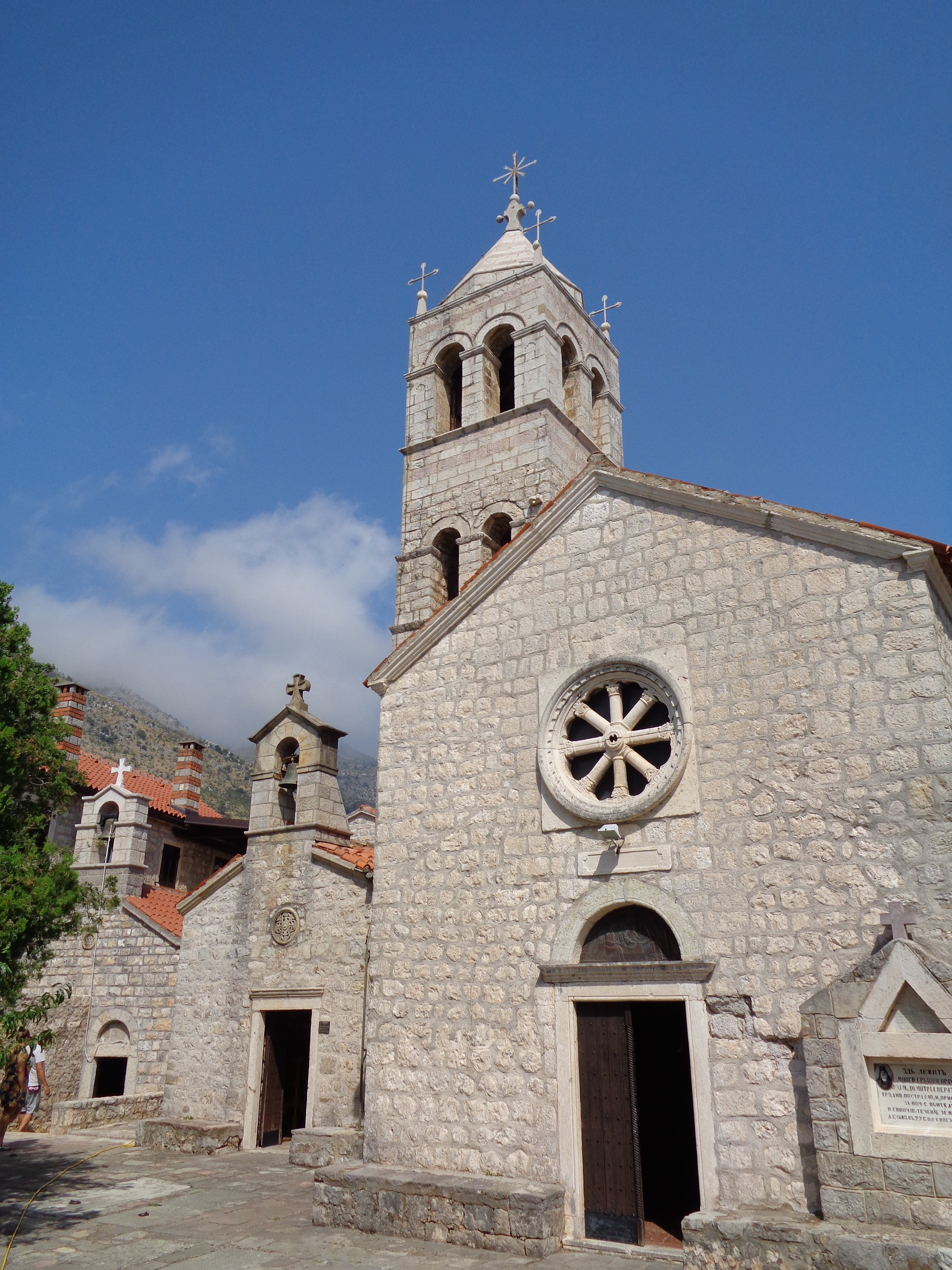

- Location within Montenegro

Religion
- Affiliation: Serbian Orthodox Church
- Ecclesiastical or organizational status: Metropolitanate of Montenegro and the Littoral
- Status: Active

Location
- Location: Katun Reževići, Budva
- Municipality: Budva
- State: Montenegro
- Interactive map of Reževići Monastery
- Coordinates: 42.2149°N 18.9240°E

Architecture
- Type: Byzantine architecture
- Style: Serbo-Byzantine architecture
- Founder: Nemanjić dynasty
- Funded by: Stefan Nemanjić

Website
- Manastir Rezevici

The Reževići Monastery (Serbian: Манастир Режевићи, romanized: Manastir Reževići) is a medieval Serbian Orthodox monastery located in Katun Reževići village between Budva and Petrovac in modern-day Montenegro. The monastery has two churches. According to a local legend, the 'Church of the Dormition of the Mother of God' was built in the 1220s by King Stefan Nemanjić (Stefan the First-Crowned), the first king of Serbia while the 'Church of the Archdeacon Stefan' was built by Emperor Stephen Uroš IV Dušan of Serbia in 1351.

== Etymology ==
The name of the monastery is derived from the name of the clan Reževići, one of clans of the Paštrovići tribe.

== Legends ==
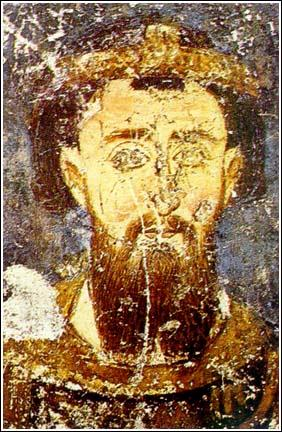
Monastery was built by Stefan Nemanjić, King of Serbia

According to local legends, there was a column in front of a guesthouse on the road between Budva and Petrovac in the Kingdom of Serbia in which a wine vessel full of wine was kept for thirsty passersby. One legend says that Raymond IV, Count of Toulouse drank from this vessel during the First Crusade.

According to another legend, Stefan the First-Crowned, the first king of Serbia, drank wine from this wine vessel during his visit to his cousin, Venetian Doge Dandolo. Later, in 1223 or 1226, he allegedly built 'The Church of the Dormition of the Mother of God' (Serbian: Црква Успења Пресвете Богородице) near the guesthouse.

In 1351, a church dedicated to Saint Stephen—the 'Church of the Archdeacon Stefan' (Serbian: Црква архиђакона Стефана)—was built next to The Church of the Dormition of the Mother of God аgainst the order issued by Stephen Uroš IV Dušan of Serbia during his trip from Dubrovnik to Skadar. The column with wine vessel (kept full by the population of surrounding villages to show their hospitality) survived until the mid 19th century.

== History ==
The monastery was a gathering place for the members of the Paštrovići tribe who traditionally held meetings there to make important decisions or to elect their chieftain. The last chieftain elected by the Paštrovići assembly held at this monastery was Stefan Štiljanović. Both churches and guesthouse were deserted for some time after they had been plundered and razed by the pirates of Ulcinj in the mid 15th century. In 1785, the monastery, its library and treasury were plundered by Mahmud Pasha Bushatli. Frescoes from the beginning of the 17th century and some remains of frescoes from the 18th-century have been preserved. It is believed that they were the work of Strahinja of Budimlje, who painted frescoes in many churches at that time. Also in 1833, painter Aleksije Lazović worked on the icons of the "Dormition of the Mother of God" Serbian Orthodox Church in Reževići Monastery, near Petrovac na Moru.

== See also ==
- List of Serbian Orthodox monasteries
