= Raniero Dandolo =

Raniero Dandolo or Rainero Dandolo (fl. 1204–42) was a Venetian admiral and statesman, titled Procurator of San Marco and Vice-Doge of Venice. The son of the 41st Doge of Venice, Enrico Dandolo (r. 1192–1205), he served as Vice-Doge during his father's absence. His daughter Anna Dandolo married Serbian Grand Prince, subsequently King, Stefan Nemanjić (r. 1196–1228) in 1217.
