= Anna Dandolo =

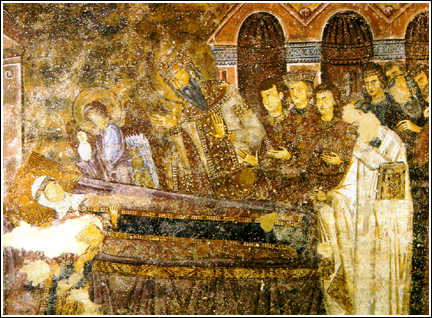
- Wall painting at Sopoćani monastery depicting Anna Dandolo on her deathbed surrounded by her family and members of the clergy

Queen consort of Serbia
- Tenure: 1217–1228
- Coronation: 1217
- Born: Venice
- Died: 1258; Serbia
- Burial: Sopoćani
- Spouses: Stefan the First-Crowned
- Issue: Stefan Uroš I
- House: Dandolo
- Father: Rainero Dandolo

Anna Dandolo (Serbian: Ana Dandolo / Ана Дандоло; fl. 1217–1258) was a Venetian noblewoman who became Queen of Serbia as the second wife of King Stefan the First-Crowned, founder of the Serbian kingdom. She was crowned with Stefan in 1217, and she held this title until his death on 24 September 1228. She was the granddaughter of Enrico Dandolo, Doge of Venice. King Stefan Uroš I was her son.

== Life ==
=== Origin ===
Anna was born in Venice, Republic of Venice, on an unknown date, as a member of the House of Dandolo, which ruled in Venice. She was the daughter of Rainero Dandolo, Vice-Doge of Venice, and Procurator of San Marco. Her paternal grandfather was Enrico Dandolo, Doge of Venice, who had earlier made incursions into Zadar (1202) and Constantinople (1204). In 1209, her father was killed in battle against the Genoese during the conquest of Candia.

=== Queen of Serbia ===
In about 1216 or 1217, she married Stefan, the Grand Prince of Serbia and son of Stefan Nemanja, in a magnificent ceremony which was celebrated in Venice and attended by all the patrician families in the republic. Following the splendid festivities held in their honour, the bridal couple were then transported with much fanfare by galley to Dalmatia. Anna was his second wife; his first, Eudokia Angelina, from whom he had separated for alleged adultery, had died in 1211. The marriage of Stefan to a woman from the powerful maritime republic of Venice was politically advantageous to Serbia; the alliance also strengthened Orthodox Serbia's ties to the west and brought a strong Latin influence to the country through the Venetian artisans who followed in Anna's wake. In 1217, Stefan was crowned the first king of Serbia by Archbishop Sava, and Anna became the first queen.

Shortly before his death on 24 September 1228, King Stefan took monastic vows. Anna lived until 1258, long enough to see her only son, Stephen Uroš succeed to the Serbian throne in 1243 following the deposition of his half-brother, Stefan Vladislav I. Stephen Uroš I married Helen of Anjou, by whom he had issue.

It is believed that Anna died in 1258. She was buried in the Sopoćani monastery, a royal mausoleum where Stefan the First-Crowned and other descendants were buried. The fresco depiction of her death is of valuable historical significance and has been described as "one of the most important historical compositions painted on the walls of Serbian medieval churches", depicted on the north wall. The work has been dated to between 1263 and 1268.

== Family and legacy ==
Together they had one son, Stephen Uroš I, born in about 1223, and a daughter, whose name is not recorded. She also had three stepsons from her husband's former marriage.

Italian poet Gabriele d'Annunzio immortalised Anna in his 1914 Ode alla nazione serba with the line:

O Serbia, che avesti regina di grazie Anna Dandolo.

(O Serbia, who had Anna Dandolo as queen of graces). With a single metrical line, d'Annunzio elevated Anna Dondolo akin to a saint.

== See also ==
- List of Serbian consorts

Royal titles
Preceded by Eudokia Angelina as Grand Princess	Queen consort of Serbia; 1217–1228	Succeeded by Anna Angelina Komnene Doukaina
