= Komnena Nemanjić =

Serbian Princess Consort of Arbanon

Komnena Nemanjić Komnena Nemanja Комнина Немањић
- Princess Consort of Arbanon; Lady of Krujë
- Coat of arms of the Nemanjić family

Princess Consort of Arbanon
- Tenure: c. 1208 – c. 1215
- Successor: Position abolished (Arbanon incorporated into Despotate of Epirus)

Lady of Krujë
- Tenure: c. 1208 - c. 1215; 1216-12??
- Successor: Unnamed Daughter
- Born: c. 1194; Grand Principality of Serbia
- Died: Unknown
- Spouses: Dhimitër Progoni (m. 1208; died 1215) Grigor Kamona (m. 1216)
- Issue: Unnamed Daughter
- Dynasty: Nemanjić (by birth); Progoni (by marriage)
- Father: Stephen II Nemanjić
- Mother: Eudokia Angelina

Komnena Nemanjić (Serbian Cyrillic: Комнина Немањић; Albanian: Komnena Nemanja or Komnena Nemanjiq; fl. c. 1208 – c. 1215), also known as Komnina, was a Serbian princess from the Nemanjić dynasty and a member of the Byzantine imperial family through her mother. She became Princess consort of Arbanon through her marriage to Dhimitër Progoni, Prince of Arbanon and ruler of the Principality of Arbanon. After his death around 1215, she married Grigor Kamona, his successor in Krujë.

== Life ==
=== Early life ===
Komnena, born around 1194, was the daughter of Stefan the First-Crowned, Grand Prince of Serbia and later King of Serbia, and his first wife, Eudokia Angelina, a Byzantine noblewoman and daughter of Alexios III Angelos. Not much is known about her early life.

=== First Marriage ===
Komnena married Dhimitër Progoni, Prince of Arbanon and lord of Krujë, likely around 1208 to 1210. Through this marriage, she became princess consort of Arbanon and lady of Krujë. Dhimitër held the high Byzantine title of panhypersebastos, a title he received as a son-in-law of the Serbian royal court. Dhimitër viewed Venice as his main adversary, particularly after Venice allied with George of Zeta, on 3 July 1208, against Dhimitër, who ruled from his stronghold at Krujë. George promised Venice military support if Dhimitër attacked Venetian territories (Duchy of Durazzo). Dhimitër, who had married Komnena, had close ties to Raška, which influenced these regional tensions.

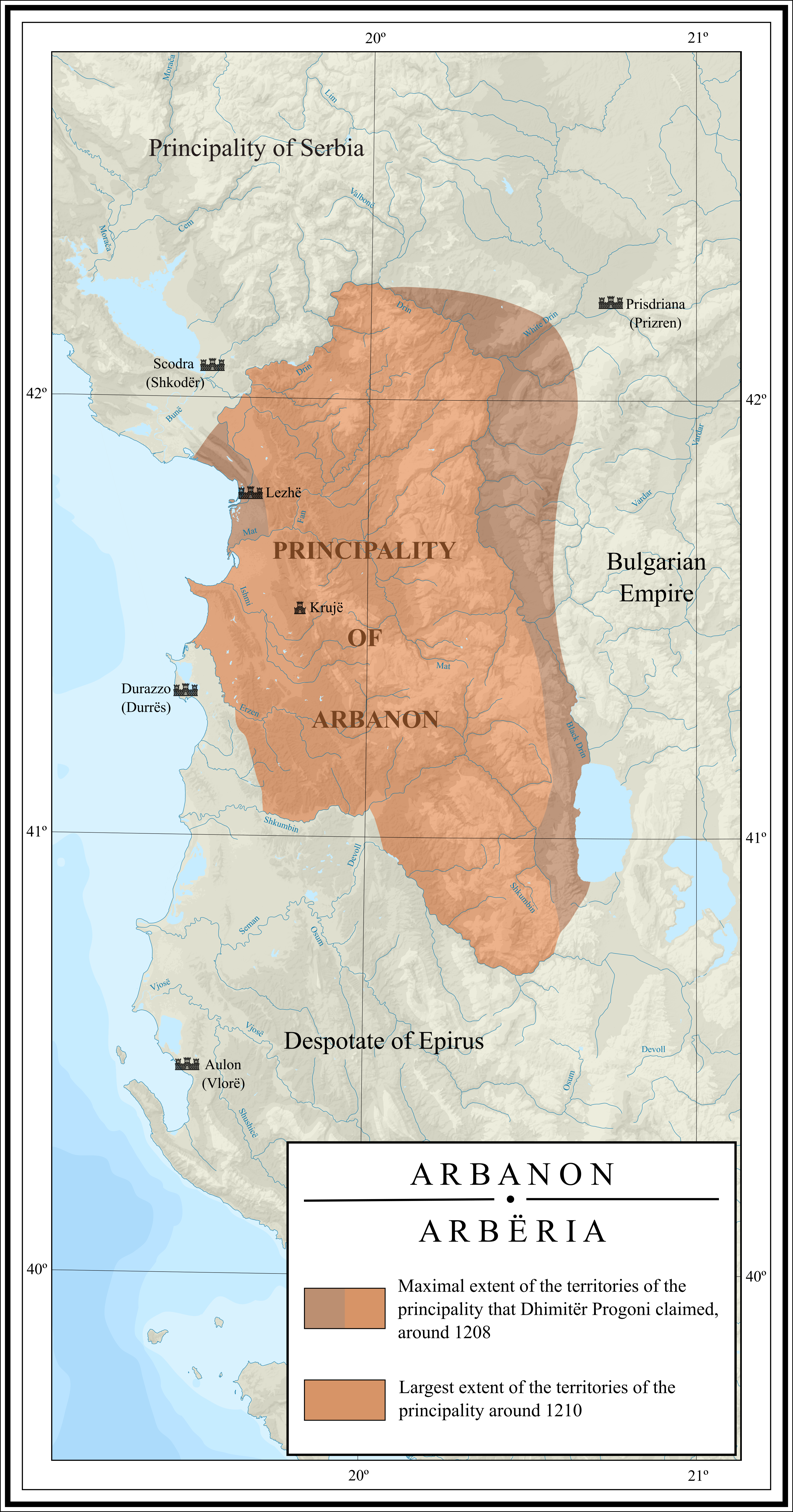
Principality of Arbanon 1208 - 1210

Around 1212-1213, Michael Angelos of Epirus invaded the Duchy of Durazzo, Venice decided to abandon its struggling duchy in Albania, ceding control to Michael. Michael then advanced northward into Albania around 1215, eventually taking Krujë, which was Dhimitër Progoni’s stronghold, after which Dhimitër disappears from historical records. The Principality of Arbanon effectively ceased to exist as an independent entity, coming under the control of the Despotate of Epirus. Although Arbanon ceased to be fully independent following the Epirote conquest, it continued to exist as a semi-autonomous region under Epirote suzerainty. Dhimitër Progoni died around 1215, leaving Komnena a widow at about twenty or twenty-one years old after a relatively short marriage.

=== Second Marriage ===
After Dhimitër Progoni’s death, Komnena shortly after married Grigor Kamona, Sebastos and Lord of Krujë. Grigor had inherited the fortress of Krujë and its associated rights through his previous marriage to the daughter of Gjin Progoni, who was the brother of Dhimitër. By this time, Krujë was fully incorporated into the Despot of Epirus ruled by Theodore of Epirus.

However, this second marriage sparked a dispute, as it raised concerns under canon law due to the close relationship between the two women because Grigor's previous wife was Komnena’s former niece by marriage. According to canon law, this close familial connection raised questions about the legitimacy of the new marriage. The bishop of Krujë, where the dispute had arisen, objected to the union on these grounds.

To resolve the issue, Grigor appealed to Demetrios Chomatenos, the Chartophylax of the Archbishopric of Ohrid and later Archbishop himself. Chomatenos addressed the matter by writing a formal letter to the bishop of Krujë, offering a detailed justification for the marriage from a canonical standpoint. His legal and theological reasoning ultimately upheld the validity of the union, settling the matter in favor of Grigor and Komnena.

== Family ==
Komnena Nemanjić married Dhimitër Progoni and later Grigor Kamona. It is unknown whether her first marriage resulted in any children. From her second marriage to Grigor Kamona, she had at least one known daughter, though it remains uncertain whether the couple had additional children.

- Unknown Daughter, married Golem of Kruja, Lord of Krujë and Elbasan.

== See also ==
- Nemanjić dynasty

== Bibliography ==
- Akademia Shqiptare e Shkencave (2023). Historia e Popullit Shqiptar Nga Ilirët te Skënderbeu [History of the Albanian People From the Illyrians to Skanderbeg] (in Albanian). librashqip. ISBN 979-8-2239-4494-2.
- Dubov, Kalman (2024). Journeys to Albania; Land of Besa.
- Ducellier, Alain (1999). "Albania, Serbia and Bulgaria". The New Cambridge Medieval History. Vol. 5. Cambridge: Cambridge University Press. ISBN 9780521362894.
- Elsie, Robert (2010). Historical Dictionary of Albania. Scarecrow Press. ISBN 978-0-8108-7380-3.
- Fine, John V. A. (1994). The Late Medieval Balkans: A Critical Survey from the Late Twelfth Century to the Ottoman Conquest. University of Michigan Press. ISBN 978-0-4720-8260-5.
- Lala, Etleva (2008). Regnum Albaniae, the Papal Curia, and the Western Visions of a Borderline Nobility. Central European University Department of Medieval Studies.
- Nicol, Donald MacGillivray (1957). The Despotate of Epiros. Blackwell.
- Nicol, Donald MacGillivray (1986). Studies in Late Byzantine History and Prosopography. Variorum Reprints. ISBN 978-0-8607-8190-5.
- Purković, Miodrag (1956). Принцезе из куће Немањића [Princesses from the House of Nemanjić] (in Serbian). Avala.
- Schmitt, Oliver Jens; Fischer, Bernd J. (2022). A Concise History of Albania. Cambridge University Press. ISBN 978-1-1076-6218-6.
- Sufflay, Emil von; Jireček, Konstantin; Thallóczy, Lajos (1913). Acta et diplomata res Albaniae mediae aetatis illustrantia - Volume 1 [Acts and documents illustrating the affairs of medieval Albania - Volume 1] (in Latin). typis A. Holzhausen.
