= Maglič =

Spur castle

Maglič Маглич (Serbian)
- Kraljevo, Serbia
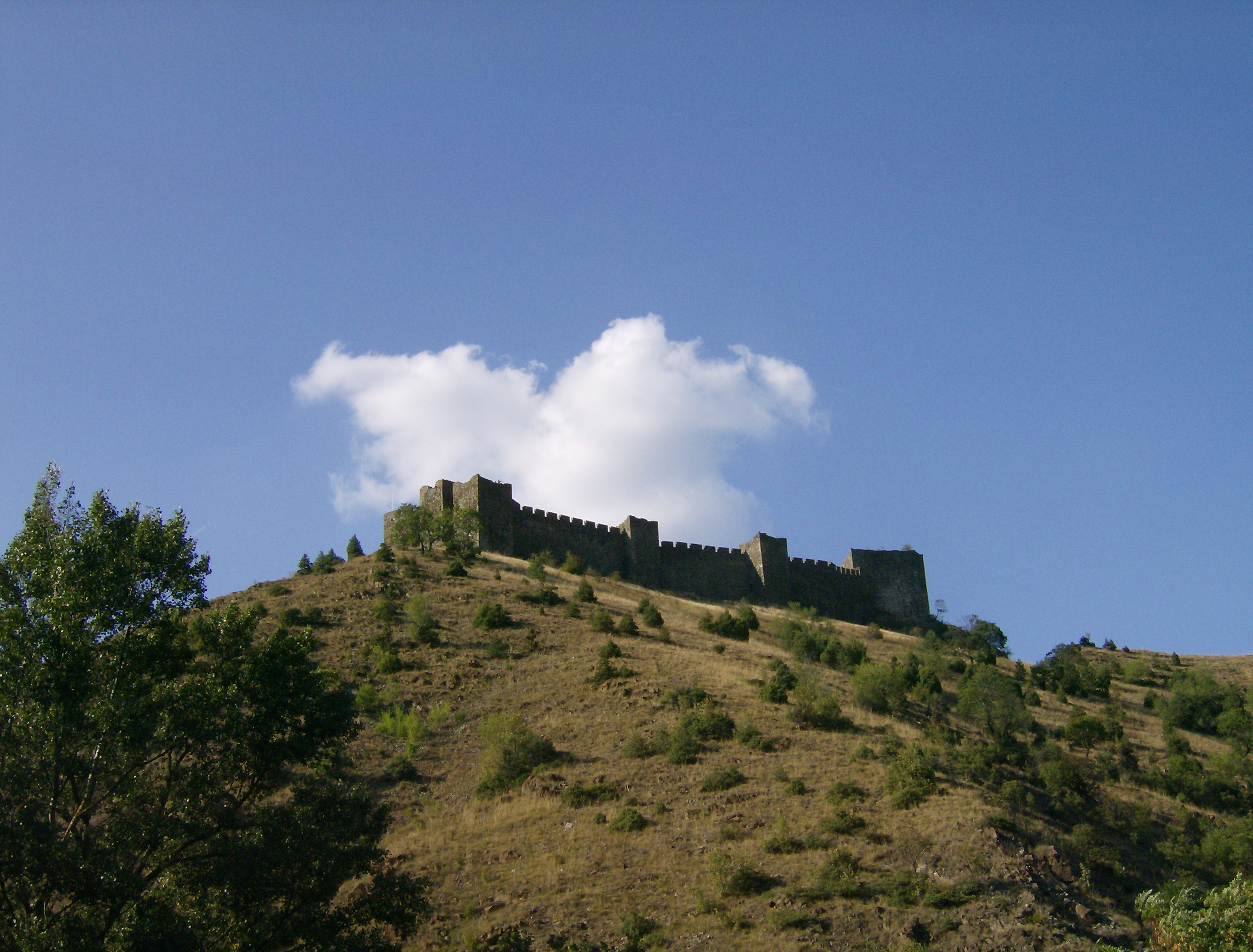
- Maglič Fortress

Site information
- Type: Castle
- Controlled by: City of Kraljevo
- Open to the public: Yes
- Condition: Ruins

Location
- Location within Serbia
- Coordinates: 43°36′49″N 20°33′08″E

Site history
- Built: 13th century
- Built by: Stefan the First-Crowned; Stefan Uroš I Archbishop Danilo II
- Materials: Stone

Cultural Heritage of Serbia
- Type: Cultural Monument of Exceptional Importance
- Designated: 1948
- Reference no.: СК 168

Maglič (Serbian Cyrillic: Маглич, pronounced [mâɡlitʃ]) is a 13th-century castle about 20 kilometres (12 mi) south of Kraljevo, Serbia. The castle is located atop a hill around which the Ibar river makes a curve, about 100 metres (330 ft) above the river. The fortress protected the only road that connected the Great Morava Valley and Kosovo polje. Its name means 'the foggy one' from Serbian магла (magla) 'fog'.

Maglič was included in the list of Cultural Monuments of Exceptional Importance in 1979.

== History ==
Maglič was built in the first half of the 13th century, by either Stefan the First-Crowned, or his son Uroš I. It was built to safeguard two important monasteries, Sopoćani and Studenica, as well as prevent any future Mongolian raid deeper into the Serbian lands. In the Serbian Empire, Maglič was the seat of Archbishop Danilo II, who wrote his famous hagiographies and regiographies residing there.

After capturing Smederevo on 20 June 1459, the Ottoman Empire occupied Maglič and held it until its recapture by Serbs during the Great Turkish War. After the defeat of the Serbian uprising, the Ottoman Turks retook the fortress, abandoning it soon after.

During the Second Serbian Uprising, Voivod Radoslav Jelečanin ambushed a group of Turkish soldiers at Maglič and halted their advance from Novi Pazar.

== Architecture ==
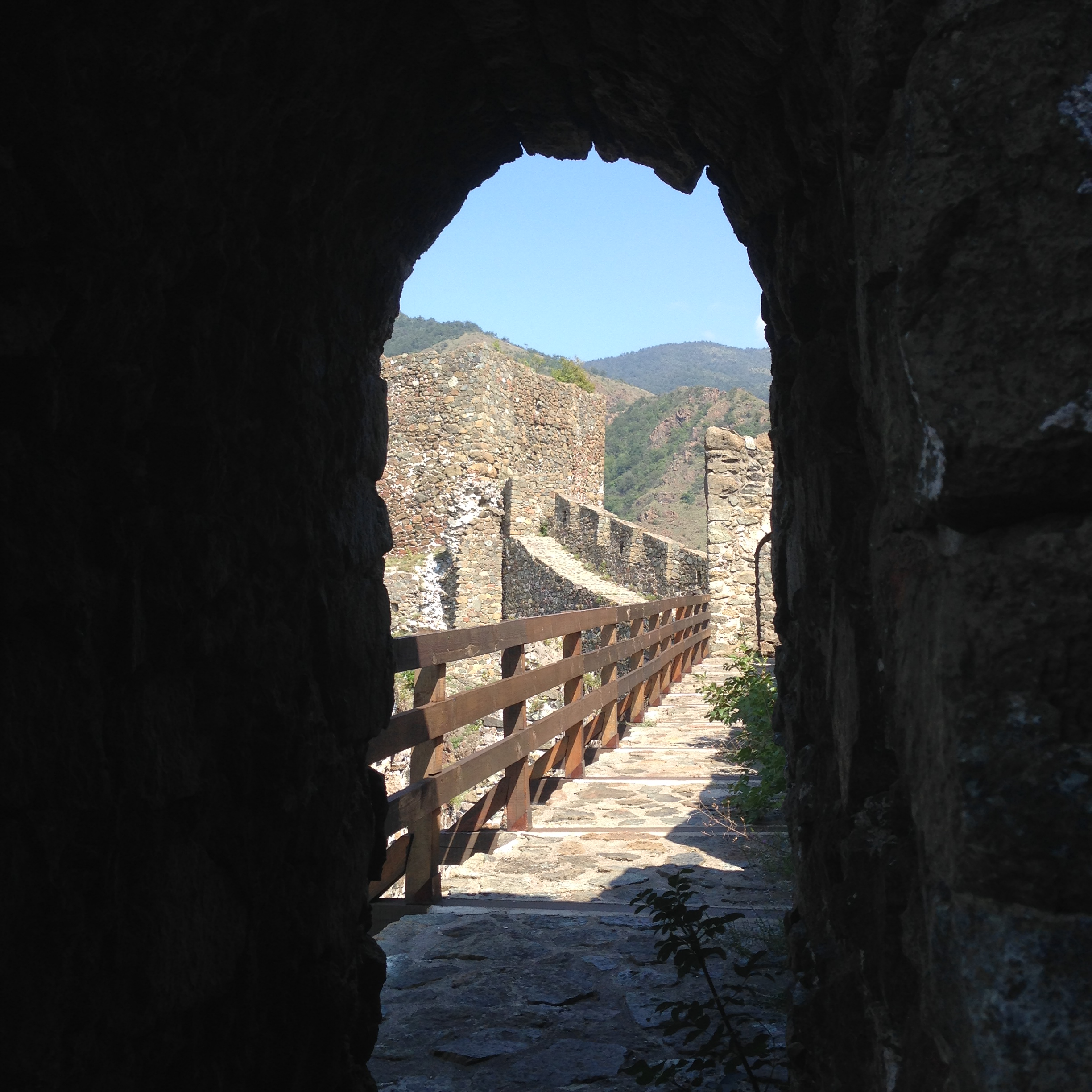
Maglič

The fortress consists of seven towers and one dungeon tower connected with walls. The towers are typical for a medieval fortress in the Balkan peninsula with three solid sides and wooden fences on inner side. Maglič has one gate placed in the north, and one small sally port in one of the towers in the southeast part. Inside the fortress are remains of a palace, barracks, and a church of Saint George. There is also a large reservoir for water and a well. In the southern part of the fortress, three towers are placed next to each other to give better protection from attacks.

== Present state ==
The fortress was partly restored after World War I, but the main restoration took place in late 1980. During that restoration, wooden floors in its towers and fences along the walls were restored. Today they are a potential danger, because some of them are rotten.

Every July, the space below the fortress is the starting point of the "Merry Ride" (Serbian: Весели спуст), a popular voyage down the Ibar River to Kraljevo. All types of river-worthy vessels are used during the voyage, and politicians often join the festivities. Usually, more than 3,000 vessels take part in this whole-day voyage.

It was announced in 2010 that Maglič would undergo restoration with local donations and financial backing from Italy.

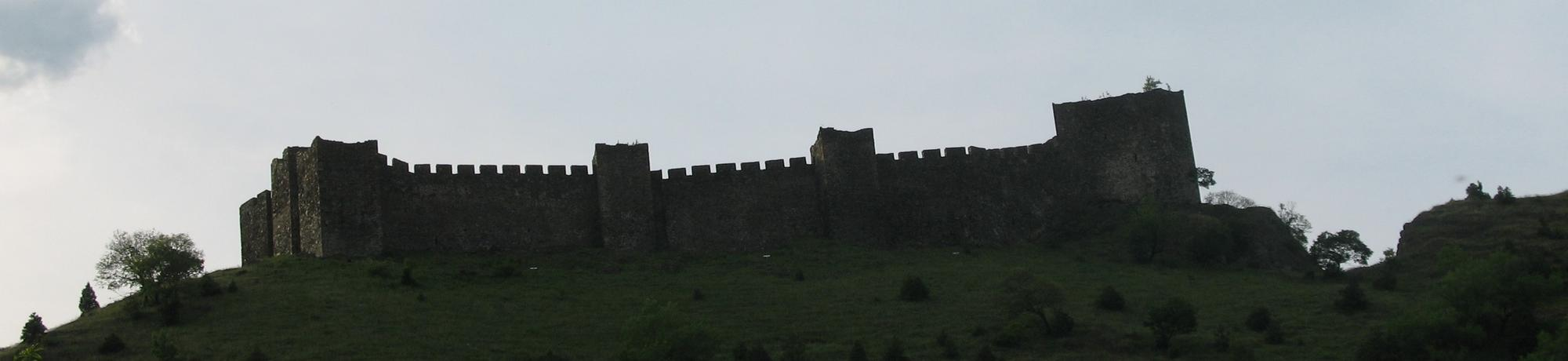
Maglič fortress

== See also ==
- Zvečan Fortress
- Golubac Fortress
- List of fortifications in Serbia
- Cultural Monuments of Exceptional Importance
- Tourism in Serbia
