= Ktetor =

Church benefactor or church warden in Orthodox Christianity

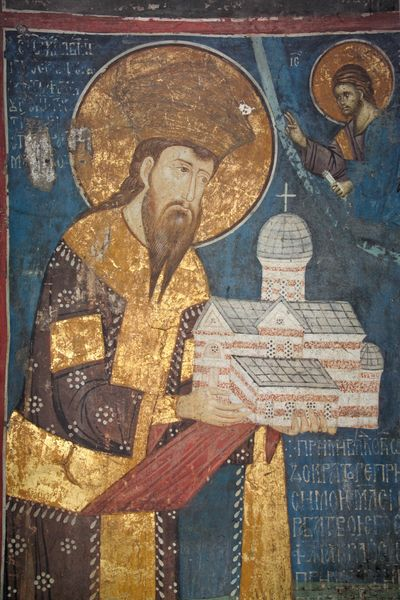
Fresco of Serbian king Stefan Dečanski at Visoki Dečani monastery, in the Serbian Autonomous Province of Kosovo and Metohija, holding a small monastery in his hands; this signifies that he is the ktetor of the monastery.

Ktetor (Greek: κτήτωρ) or ktitor (Cyrillic: ктитор; Georgian: ქტიტორი kt’it’ori; Romanian: ctitor), meaning 'founder', is a title given in the Middle Ages in the Byzantine sphere to the provider of funds for construction or reconstruction of an Eastern Orthodox church or monastery, for the addition of icons, frescos, and other works of art. The Catholic equivalent of the term is donator. At the time of founding, the ktetor often issued typika, and was illustrated on frescoes ("ktetor portrait"). The female form is ktetorissa (Greek: κτητόρισσα) or ktitoritsa (Cyrillic: ктиторица).

The donator or renovator of churches are known as "second ktetor" or "new ktetor" (Serbian: Други ктитор, нови ктитор).

== History ==
The Serbian Nemanjić dynasty were ktetors to many monasteries and churches, including the "Medieval Monuments in Kosovo" inscribed as World Heritage.

== Notable people ==
- Saint Sava, Serbian Archbishop (1219–35), founded Hilandar and reconstructed Karakallou, Xeropotamou, and Philotheou at Mount Athos.
- Andronikos II Palaiologos, Byzantine emperor (r. 1282–1328), founded the monasteries of Ardenica and reconstructed the destroyed Zograf.
- Stefan Dušan, Serbian king and emperor (r. 1331–55), founded the monasteries of the Holy Archangels, Podlastva, Duljevo and reconstructed Visoki Dečani.

== Sources ==
- Mileusnić, Slobodan (2000) [1989]. Sveti Srbi (in Serbian). Novi Sad: Prometej. ISBN 8676394784. OCLC 44601641.
- Thomas, John P. (1987). Private Religious Foundations in the Byzantine Empire. Washington, D.C.: Dumbarton Oaks. ISBN 9780884021643.
- Geoffrey Wainwright (2006). The Oxford History of Christian Worship. Oxford University Press, USA. pp. 287–. ISBN 978-0-19-513886-3.
