= Stefan Nemanja =

Grand Prince of Serbia from 1166 to 1196

Saint Stefan Nemanja Стефан Немања Simeon the Myroblyte Симеон Мироточиви
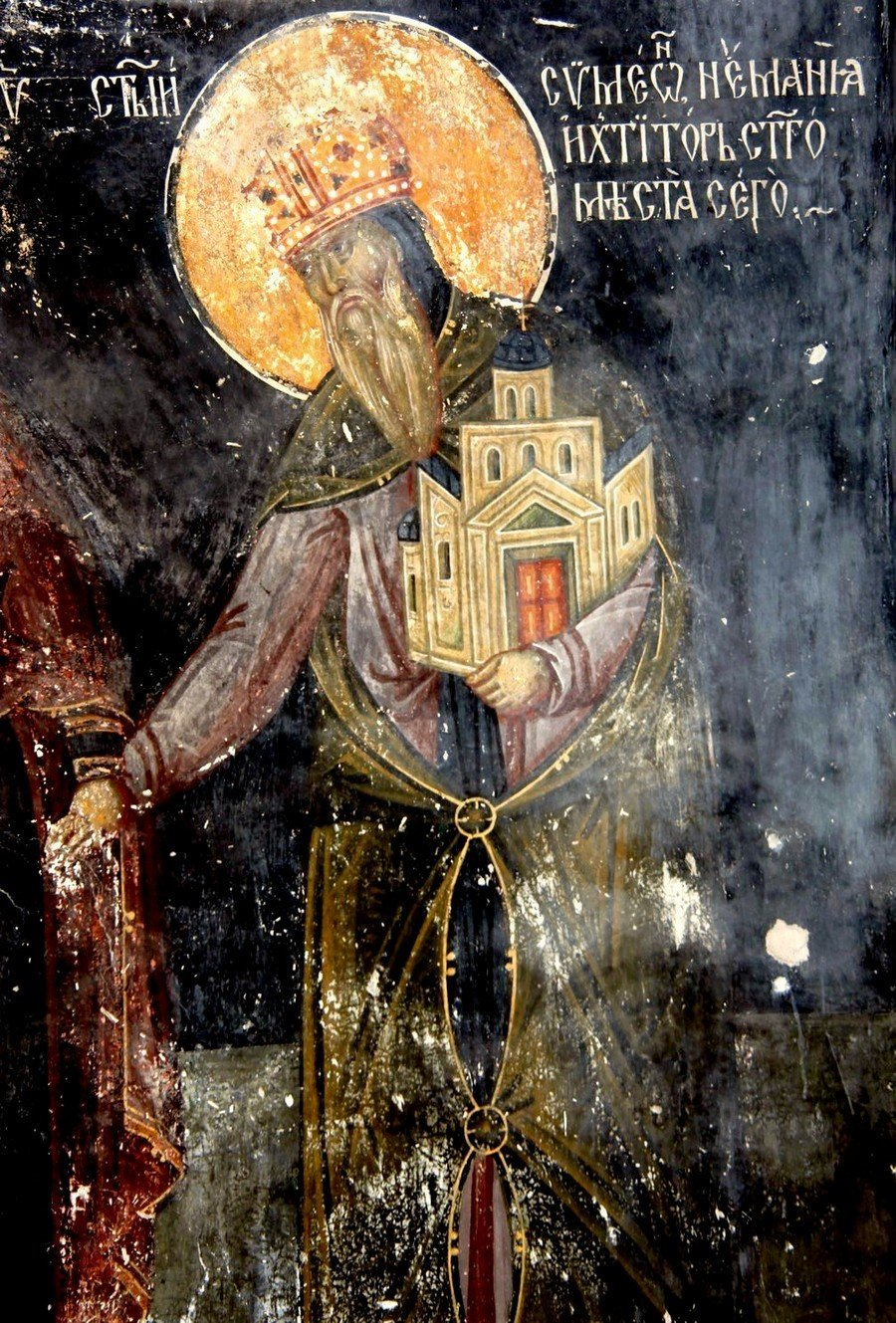
- Donor's portrait of Stefan Nemanja, fresco in the Virgin's Church of the Studenica Monastery

Venerable Myroblyte
- Venerated in: Eastern Orthodox Church
- Attributes: Church Builder

Grand Prince of Serbia
- Reign: 1166–1196
- Coronation: 1166
- Predecessor: Stefan Tihomir
- Successor: Stefan II Nemanjić
- Born: c. 1113/1114; Ribnica
- Died: 13 February 1199 (aged 84–85); Monastery of Hilandar
- Burial: Studenica Monastery
- Spouse: Anastasia of Serbia
- Issue: Vukan; Stefan; Rastko (Sava); Jefimija; Unnamed daughter
Posthumous name
- Simeon the Myrrh-streaming
- Dynasty: Nemanjić
- Father: Zavida
- Religion: Eastern Orthodox Christian previously Roman Catholic
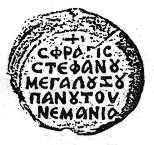
- Signature

Stefan Nemanja (Serbian Cyrillic: Стефан Немања, pronounced [stêfaːn ně̞maɲa]; c. 1113 or 1114 – 13 February 1199) was the Grand Prince (Veliki Župan) of the Serbian Grand Principality (also known as Raška, lat. Rascia) from 1166 to 1196. A member of the Vukanović dynasty, Nemanja founded the Nemanjić dynasty, and is remembered for his contributions to Serbian culture and history, founding what would evolve into the Serbian Empire, as well as the national church. According to the Serbian Academy of Sciences and Arts, Nemanja is also among the most remarkable Serbs for his literary contributions and altruistic attributes.

In 1196, after three decades of warfare and negotiations, including the Third Norman invasion of the Balkans (1185–1186) which consolidated Serbia while distinguishing it from both Western and Byzantine spheres of influence, Nemanja abdicated in favour of his middle son Stefan Nemanjić, who later became the first King of Serbia. Nemanja ultimately went to Mount Athos, where he became a monk and took the name of Simeon, joining his youngest son (later known as Saint Sava), who had already become the first archbishop of the Serbian Orthodox Church.

Together with his son Saint Sava, Nemanja restored the Hilandar Monastery at Mount Athos from 1198 to 1199, and issued the "Charter of Hilandar". The monastery thus became the center of Serbian Orthodox monasticism at Athos. Shortly after his death, the Serbian Orthodox Church canonized Stefan Nemanja, under the name Saint Simeon the Myroblyte (Serbian: Свети Симеон Мироточиви).

== Early life ==
Nemanja was born around the year 1113 or 1114 AD in Ribnica, Zeta (in the vicinity of present-day Podgorica, the capital of Montenegro). He was the youngest son of Zavida, a Prince of Zachlumia, who after a conflict with his brothers was sent to Ribnica where he had the title of Lord. Zavida (Beli Uroš) was most probably a son of Uroš I or Vukan. Since western Zeta was under Roman Catholic jurisdiction, Nemanja received a Latin baptism, although much of his later life was spent balancing Western and Eastern forms of Christianity.

== Byzantine-Hungarian War ==
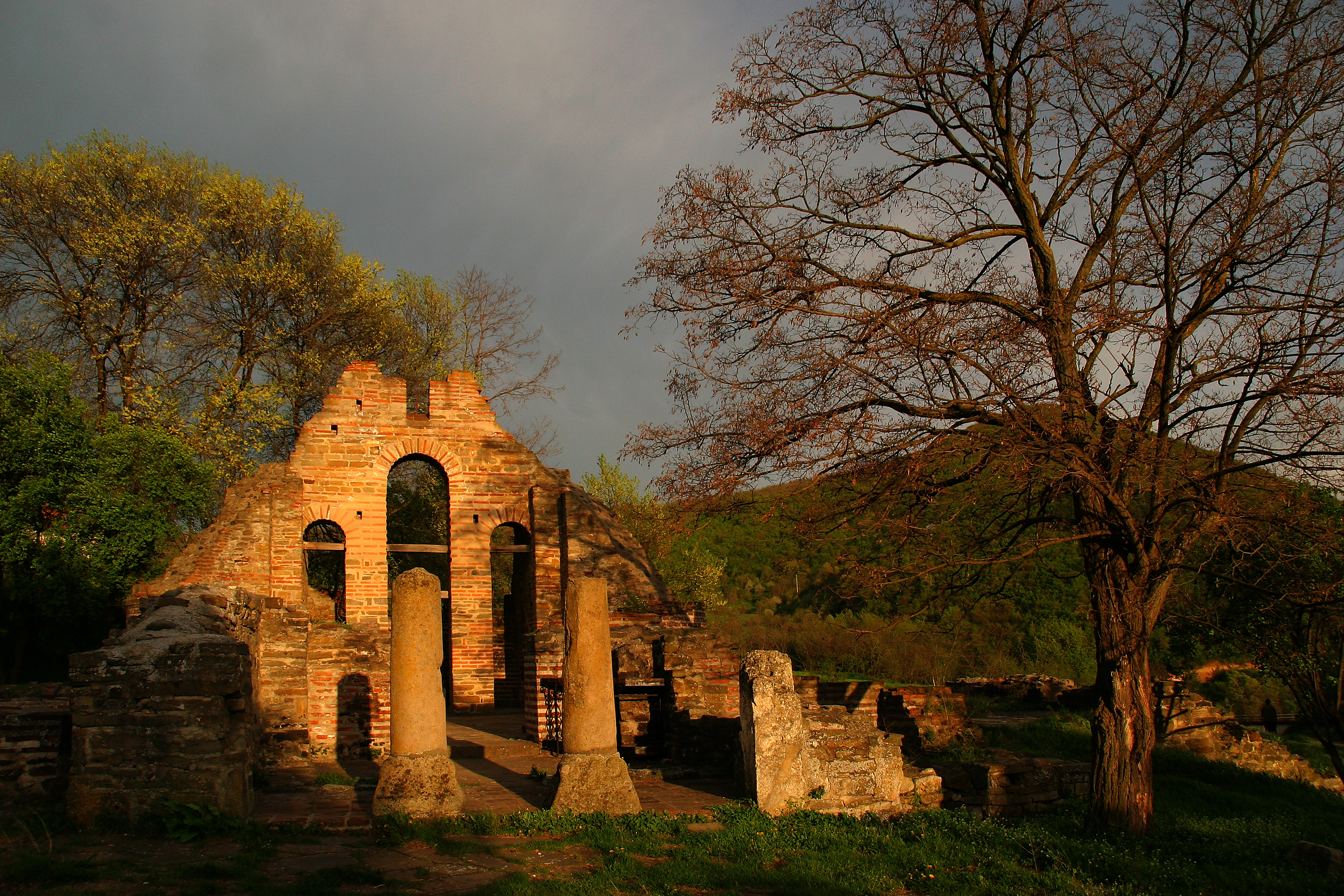
Remains of the Church of the Holy Mother of God at the confluence of the Kosanica and the Toplica River. This is Nemanja's first endowment built in 1158–1162. Monastery was abandoned after the Great Migration of Serbs during the Great Viennese or Great Turkish War of 1688–1690.

In 1163, Emperor Manuel I Comnenus came to Niš with the army via Serdica (Sofia), where, according to John Kinnamos, he decided "to deal with things concerning Serbia". At that time, Serbia was ruled by the Grand Župan Desa, an ally of Stephen III in the Hungarian dynastic conflicts, and thus an opponent of Manuel. When in 1165 Desa was finally forced to come to Niš before the emperor, his connections with the Hungarian king Stephen III were revealed, Desa called him his master, Manuel I decided to take him to court and punish him. Desa was first detained and kept under guard, and then sent to the court prison in Constantinople.

The land was given by the emperor to the administration of Zavida's sons, who were in the pro-Byzantine party: Tihomir, Stracimir, Miroslav and the youngest Nemanja. Tihomir was the oldest and became the Grand Župan of Serbia. In January 1166, Tihomir was recognized by the brothers who were given to rule other certain parts of Serbia and the Serbian-Byzantine frontier. Stracimir held the areas around West Morava, Miroslav Zahumlje, while Stefan Nemanja was given the areas around Ibar, Toplica and Dubočica (around Leskovac), which probably was historical region of Dendra west of Niš.

The Byzantine emperor Manuel I Comnenus launched a large army against Hungary because he was informed of their dissatisfaction and internal conflicts. The Hungarian prince Béla III had to live in Constantinople, where he was married, and Béla's lands, Dalmatia with southern Hungary (below Velebit), had to come under Constantinople's rule. There is resistance in Hungary, which is why Emperor Manuel embarks on a campaign. The Byzantine army conquered Zemun and Srem in 1165. The Byzantines were accompanied by the obligatory detachments of Serbs. The second Byzantine army under command of John Doukas Komnenos moved west, across Serbia and Bosnia towards the Adriatic coast. Without significant resistance, they took all the cities from Split to Bar, forcing them to recognize Byzantine rule.

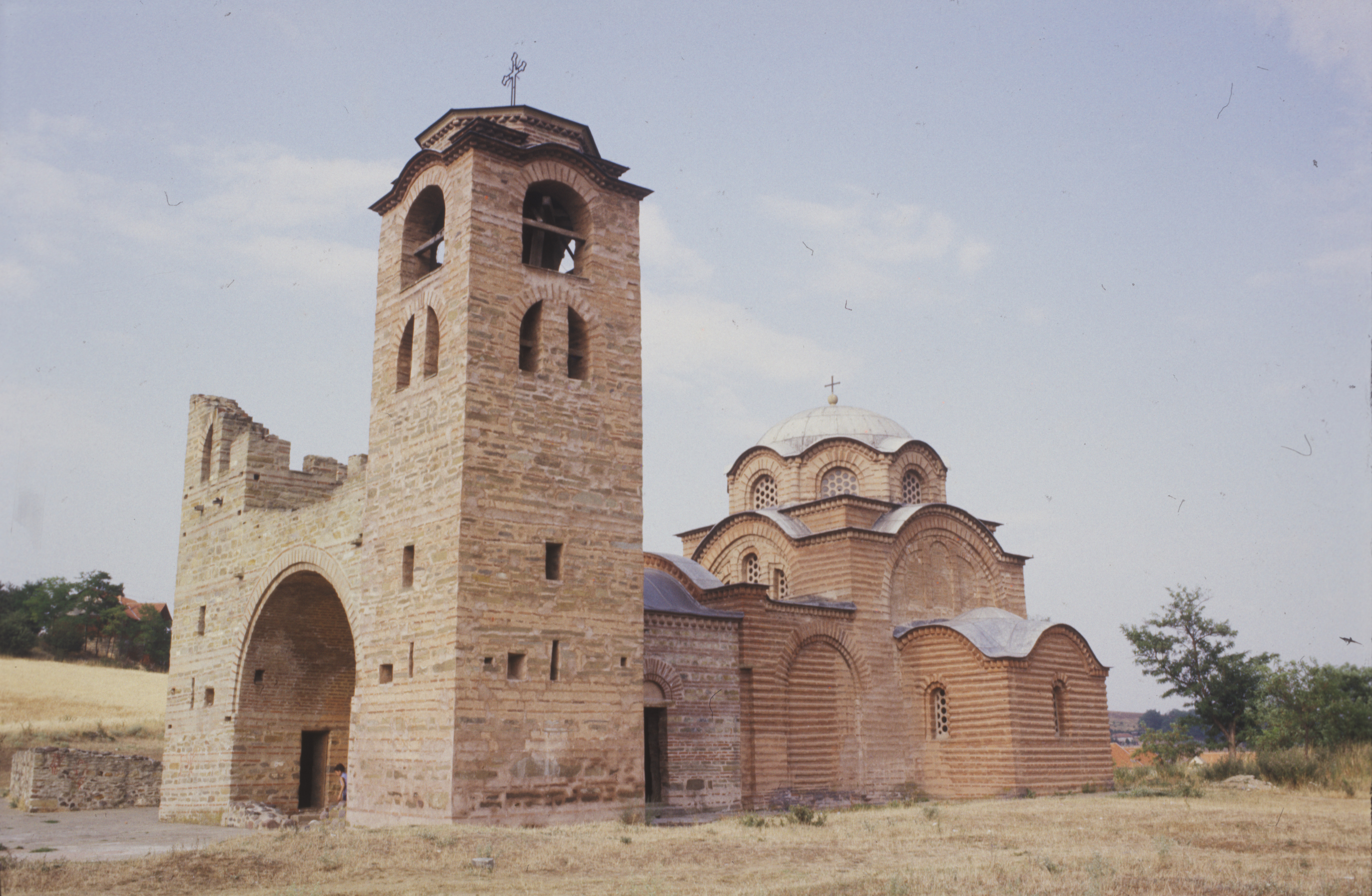
Monastery of St. Nicholas at the confluence of the Banjska and the Toplica River near modern day Kuršumlija. This church represents Nemanja's second endowment, which was built around 1166 in the Byzantine style. It was built and painted by the best masters from Constantinople.

The Byzantines also had success in a campaign in Italy where they captured an important seaport on the west coast of the Adriatic, Ancona. Venice, which had previously turned to Byzantium for help during the conquest of Friedrich Barbarossa in northern Italy, changed its attitude towards the Byzantines for fear of losing the Adriatic. It approached Hungary as a natural ally against the Byzantines. At the same time, they began to work among the Serbs, especially in Serbia, in order to rebel against Byzantium.

In 1166, the Hungarians counterattacked to push Byzantium out of the newly conquered areas. However, in response, Emperor Manuel launched three armies against Hungary, one from the Danube, and the other two across the Carpathians, towards the center of Pannonia. While the main Hungarian army was operating towards the Danube, Belgrade and Braničevo, two Byzantine armies went deep into their territory, causing general panic. The Hungarians were forced to seek peace through intermediaries to their detriment in 1167.

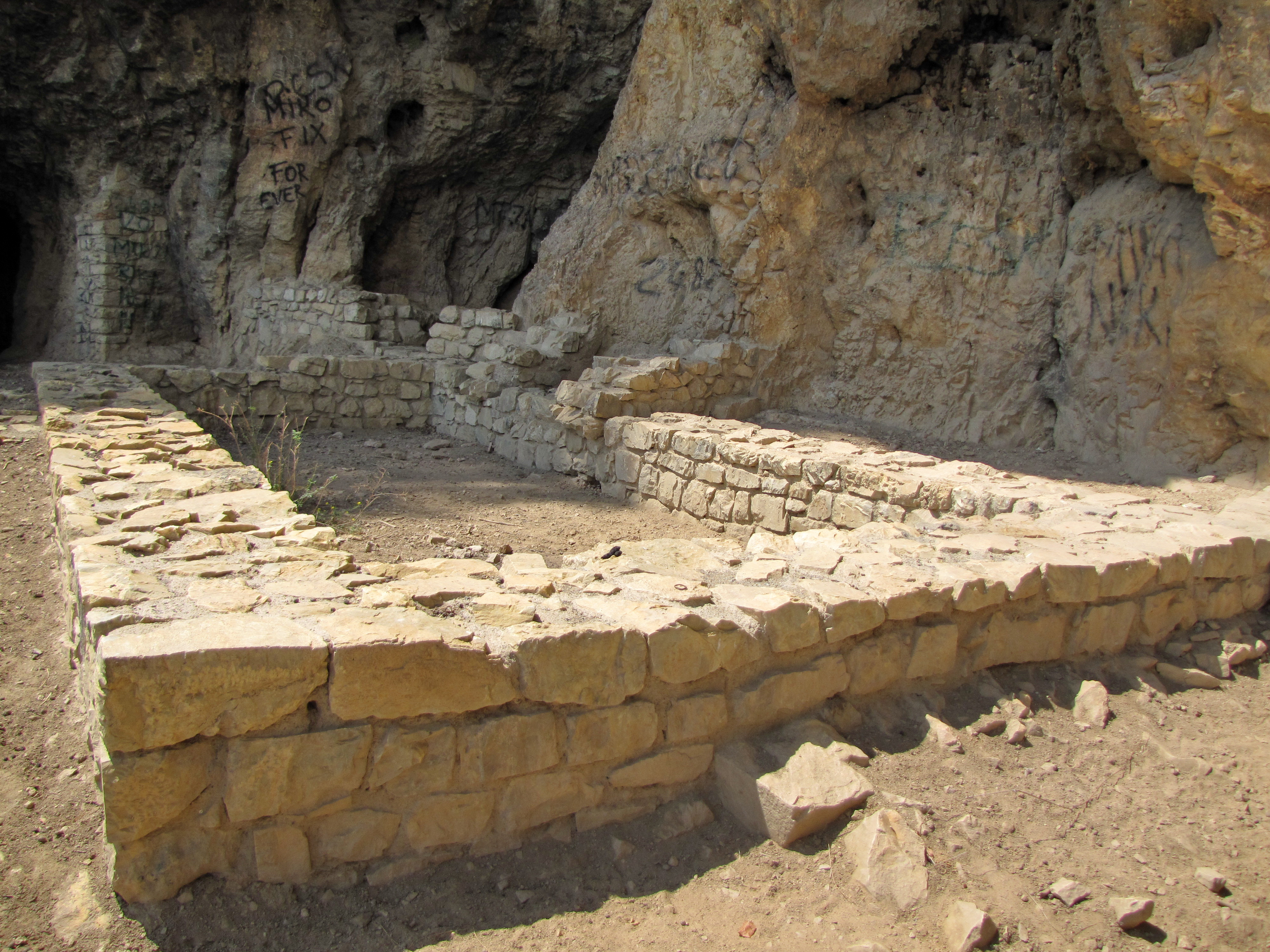
Remains of the cave monastery church of St. Archangel Michael on a cliff at the foot of Ras fortress. According to folk legend, Nemanja was imprisoned in this cave.

As the ideal candidate of Venice and Hungary among the Serbs appeared Nemanja, when his brothers and, above all, Tihomir imprisoned him in a cave near Fortress Ras. Nemanja probably hoped that he would take the place of Desa, as the former representative of the pro-Greek party, while Emperor Manuel brought his eldest brother Tihomir to the throne. Angry because of that, Nemanja changes his policy in favor of Hungary and its allies. Nemanja escaped from the dungeon, it is not known with whose help. Nemanja's son and biographer, Stefan Nemanjić, describing his father's life, says how he escaped with the help of "heavenly forces": "And this again, because of meekness and justice, and wonderful humility, and because of all good customs, with a high arm he brought him out of the rocky cave, and brought him to the throne of his fatherland, and raised him up as the great lord of all the world."

== Rise to the throne (1168–1172) ==
In 1166 or 1167, Nemanja first expanded his territories and conquered Kotor, and then gathered his supporters in Ras and started a conflict against Tihomir, who was looking for support from the Byzantines. Nemanja overthrew Tihomir, provoking Byzantines action in autumn 1168:

To make trial of Nemanja’s intent, the emperor despatched Theodore Padyates with a military force. The toparch Nemanja was in such a hostile temper that he fell upon the Romans and immediately launched an undeclared war. When he saw the emperor was in pursuit, he showed himself in battle only briefly and then hid in the cover of mountain caves which he sealed with stones. At last, his pride shattered, he prostrated himself at Manuel’s feet. Lying outstretched, ‘mighty in his mightiness’, he pleaded that he not be made to suffer cruelly, and he feared lest he be removed as ruler of the Serbs and political power be transferred to those who were more fit to rule, those whom he had pulled down so that he might seize power.

At that time, William of Tyre, an emissary of Amalric, a Latin King of Jerusalem, arrived at the diplomatic mission in Constantinople. His goal was for Byzantium to join the crusade against Egypt. During his stay in Constantinople, probably under the influence of the Byzantines, William of Tyre left negative classifications about Serbs in his reports.

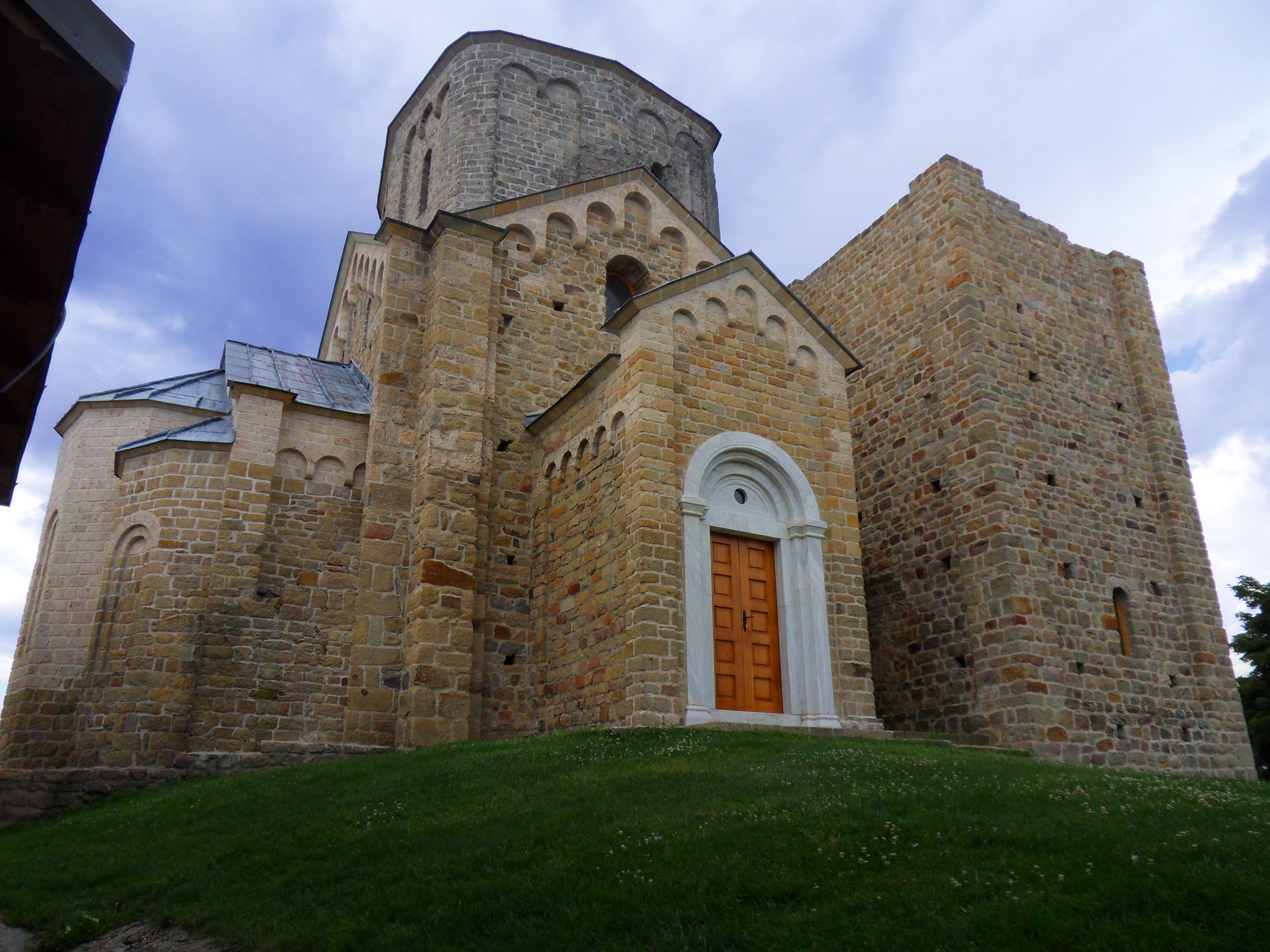
Church of St. George on the hill near modern-day Novi Pazar. This church represents Nemanja's third endowment, which was built around 1171 in the Romanesque style. It was built by the best coastal masons, most likely from Kotor, and while the frescoes were painted by the best Greek masters.

The following year, Nemanja attacked the Byzantine vassal, Prince of Zeta Radoslav, and on that occasion annexed to his country a part of the then Zeta and the Neretva region. Soon, Manuel I Komnenos came into conflict with the Venetian Republic, and on his order, on 12 March 1171, all Venetian property in Byzantium was confiscated. In response to this, from Venecia was launched Venetian navy with about 120 ships to Byzantine possessions. The Venetian fleet headed east in September of that year, conquering, by the way, Byzantine Trogir and Dubrovnik. Then Nemanja entered into closer ties with the Venetians and began attacks on Byzantine Kotor, simultaneously carrying out raids through the Moravian valley through which the main public road passes between Byzantine Belgrade and Niš. According to Arnold of Lübeck on that road, near fortress Ravno, in March 1172, the Serbs carried out a night attack on the camp of Western knights and pilgrims led by Henry the Lion accompanied by the Byzantines. Arnold of Lübeck also left a very negative opinion in his chronicle about Serbs. Probably under the impression of the night attack, he even called them the "sons of Belial." Meanwhile, in 1171, Saladin was appointed sultan of Egypt, who would become one of the greatest defenders of Islam in history.

The Kingdom of Hungary also wanted to join the fight against Byzantium, and the Holy Roman Empire of Frederick Barbarossa (1152–1190), also supported this alliance. Nemanja expected Hungarian help, but in the meantime, king Stephen III of Hungary died on 4 March 1172. The Hungarian emissaries went to Serdica (Sofia), where Emperor Manuel encamped with the army, preparing for the campaign. The Hungarian throne was won by Manuel's candidate Bela III (1173–1196). In the meantime, during the winter of 1171/72 on the island of Chios, the Venetian army was decimated by an epidemic, so that the Serbs were left alone in the fight against Byzantium. Manuel immediately took advantage of the favorable moment and after receiving the Hungarian emissaries, he headed for the Serbs at the head of the army. Before the oncoming Byzantine army, the grand zoupan Nemanja retreated to the mountains. According to the Byzantine historian John Kinnamos, the Venetians incited Nemanja to revolt.

== Byzantine vassal (1172–1182) ==
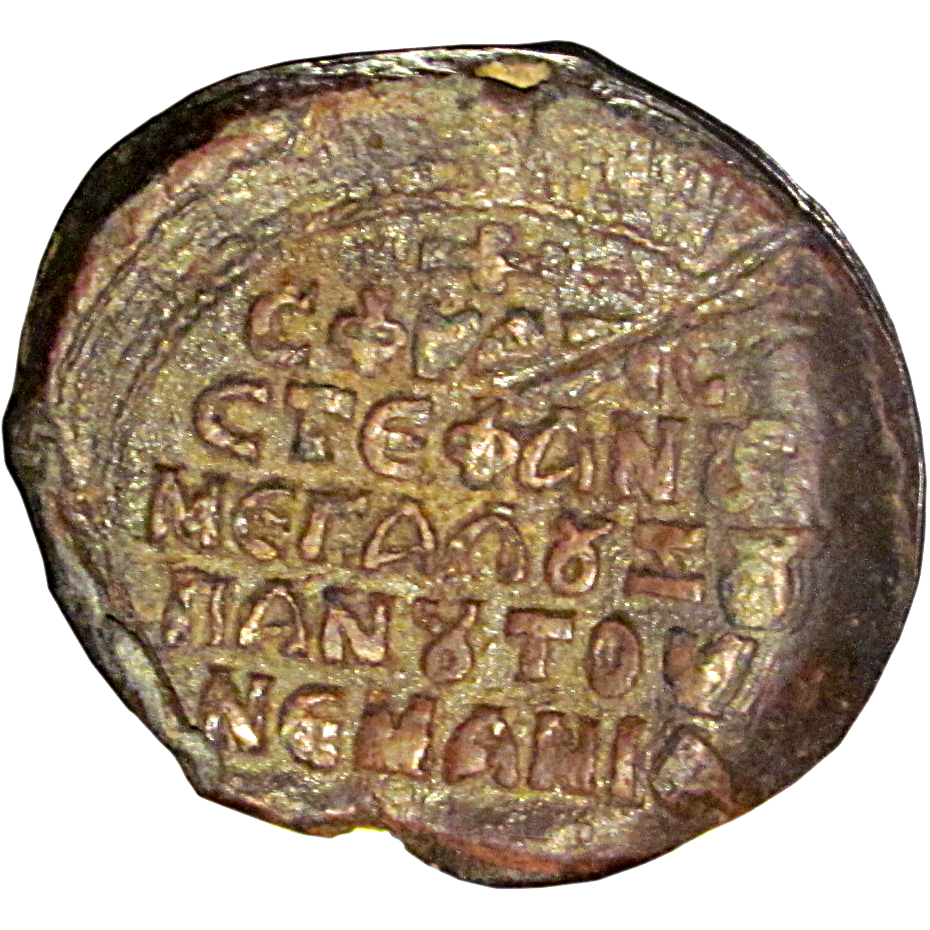
Lead seal or Bulla of the Stefan Nemanja in Greek (National Museum in Belgrade).

This conflict ended with Nemanja's surrender to Emperor Manuel. One day, Nemanja ritually obeyed Manuel I Komnenus in Niš. Barefoot, with his clothes torn to the elbows, a rope around his neck and a sword in his hands, he entered the Byzantine camp and went out to the emperor. Arriving in front of Manuel, he fell on his knees in front of him, handing him his sword, to do with him what he wanted. The Byzantine emperor accepted his humility, agreeing to the renewal of vassal obligations and leaving Nemanja in the position of grand zoupan. The final part of this episode took place in Constantinople, where Nemanja was taken as a slave in Manoel's triumphal procession, while the gathered people ridiculed him. He was even shown a "series of wall paintings that the emperor had commissioned to commemorate his victories over the Serbs; his alleged reaction is recorded in an oration by Eustathius of Thessalonica: 'Seeing these paintings, he agrees with everything and approves of the visual feast. In one respect only does he chide the painter, namely that the latter has not called him a slave (doulos) in all the scenes of the triumph'."

The Byzantine emperor Manuel Comnenus returned Nemanja to the position of Grand Župan, and he confirmed to his brothers their areas – Stracimir around the West Moravia and Miroslav Zachlumia. Upon his return to Serbia, Nemanja turned to consolidating the central government, and forced Tihomir's son and successor Prvoslav to renounce the ruler's claims in his favor.

In accordance with his vassal duties, Nemanja regularly sent auxiliary detachments to Byzantine military campaigns. Serbian detachments were also part of the Byzantine army that was defeated by the troops of the Sultanate of Rum in the battle of Myriokephalon on 17 September 1176 in the gorges of Asia Minor.

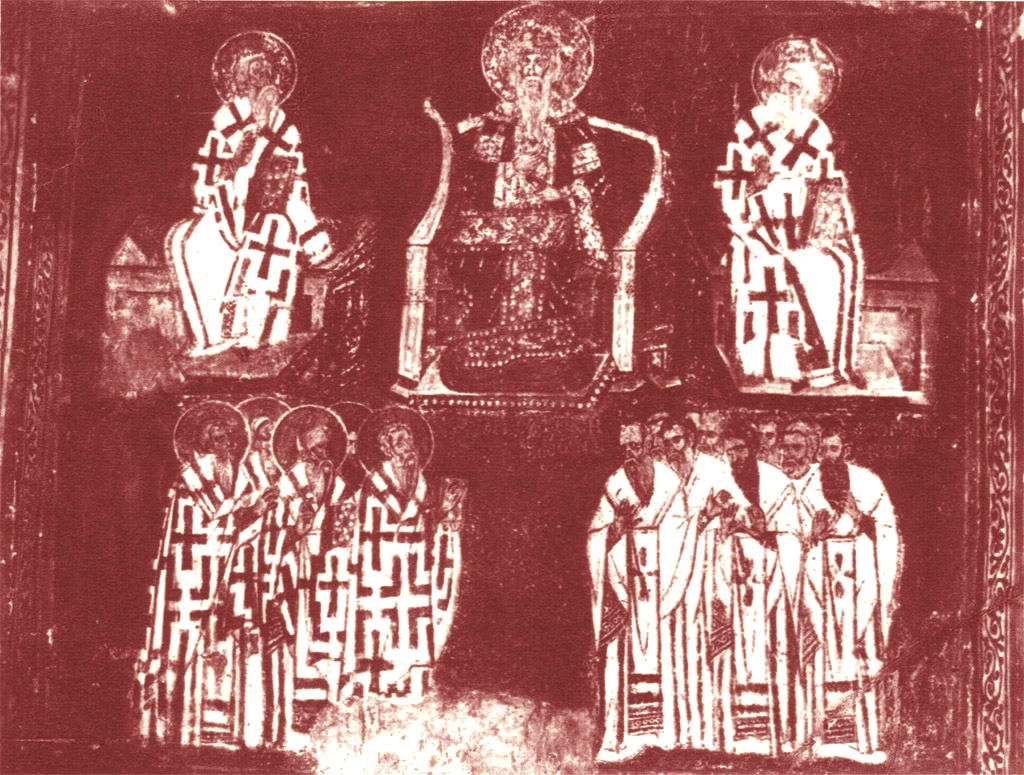
A fresco from 1290 in the church of St. Achilles in Arilje, which depicts the Council against Heretics held in 1176. Bogumils are shown in the lower right corner.

Bogumilism reached its peak in the Byzantine Empire during the 11th and in the first half of the 12th century. At the end of the 12th century, among Serbs and other Balkan Slavs, there was a very widespread 'Slavic' Gnosticism or dualistic teaching called Bogumilism. The main political tendency of Bogomilism was resistance to the Byzantine state and church authorities.

Bogumilism itself was very widespread among the people in Serbia and Bosnia, and its spread among the nobles led to Nemanja's actions against them. He convened a state-church assembly at which a decision was to be made on further measures against them. The Assembly gathered the entire state leadership, composed of nobles and Bishop Euthymius of Ras, as well as a large number of abbots and monks. The assembly was held around 1176, during the time of Nemanja's vassalship and before the death of Emperor Manoel in 1180. The grand zoupan Nemanja gave a speech at the assembly about the harmfulness of the Bogumil heresy. A woman who was married to a heretic spoke as the main witness at the assembly. Her testimony was crucial to end the quarrel at the council and to give the majority the impression that it was a harmful religious teaching. After consultations, especially with the Bishop Euthymius, the grand zopuan brought measures against them. The leader of the Bogumil community in Serbia was caught and brought before the court. The grand zoupan spared the life of their leader, and he was sentenced to corporal punishment, cutting off his tongue so that he would no longer blaspheme and spread harmful teachings. The army was sent to those parts of Serbia where their actions were most pronounced. The primary goal of this action was conversion.

The measures taken against those who refused were the confiscation of property, the punishment of milder punishments, the burning of books, as well as expulsion from the country. For the Bogumil community in Serbia, this was certainly persecution and ruthless action. Their confiscated property was distributed to the lepers and the poor.

== War with Byzantium (1183–1191) ==
After the death of Emperor Manuel on 24 September 1180, the Hungarian king Bela III considered that he had no more obligations to Byzantium. The following 1181, he launched an offensive against Byzantium and conquered Srem (Sirmium) the northeastern part of the Adriatic coast (Including Zara) and Zemun. Byzantium was then occupied by internal conflicts, so that there was no military response to the Hungarian conquests. In 1182, Bela III ordered an attack on Byzantine Belgrade and Braničevo. The attack itself was quite clumsily carried out, and both fortresses were defended by experienced military leaders from the time of Emperor Manoel, Alexius Branas and Andronikos Lapardas.

Byzantine Empire at the time of the death of Emperor Manuel I in 1180.

Following the death of Manuel I in 1180, his widow, the Latin princess Maria of Antioch, acted as regent to her infant son Alexios II Komnenos. Her regency was notorious for the favoritism shown to Latin merchants and was overthrown in April 1182 by Andronikos I Komnenos, who entered the city in a wave of popular support. Almost immediately, the celebrations spilled over into massacre of Latins.

The usurpation of Andronikos I freed Nemanja from subordination to the Byzantine emperor. Stefan Nemanja, in alliance with the Hungarian king Bela III, launched a great offensive on Byzantium in 1183. Also, the commander of the Byzantine army, Andronicus Lampardis in Niš and Braničevo, renounced obedience to the new central authorities. At the same time, the Hungarian king Bela III conquered Byzantine Belgrade, Niš and Serdica (Sofia). According to the Byzantine historian Niketas Choniates, the Serbs, led by Nemanja, joined this campaign. The following year, Nemanja launched an offensive on the southeastern Adriatic coast and conquered Byzantine Skadar and besieged Dubrovnik (Ragusa).

In 1185, Andronicus I was killed in Constantinople and the new Byzantine emperor Isaac II Angelos began peace negotiations with the Hungarian king. The peace treaty provided for Emperor Isaac II to marry Bela's daughter Margaret. The Hungarian army withdrew from the Byzantine central part of the Balkans, leaving Nemanja without support. Fortunately for Nemanja, at the same time, the Normans and the Bulgarians joined the anti-Byzantine alliance.

Nemanja forced Dubrovnik (Ragusa) to replace Byzantium with Norman rule. The Normans of king William II of Sicily, also in 1185, conquered Dyrrachium and Thessalonica, and embarked on an expedition to Constantinople, but they lost discipline due to large-scale looting, so the Byzantines easily defeated them in the battle of Demetritzes near Lower Struma. In October 1185, in the Lower Danube, in northern Bulgaria, an uprising began, led by the brothers Peter and Ivan I Asen, one of the reasons for which was an extraordinary tribute that Emperor Isaac II ordered to be collected for his wedding. Nemanja then coordinated actions with the Asen brothers against Byzantium. In September 1186, Nemanja and his brothers "made peace with the city of Dubrovnik", ruled by William II.

=== Between two emperors ===
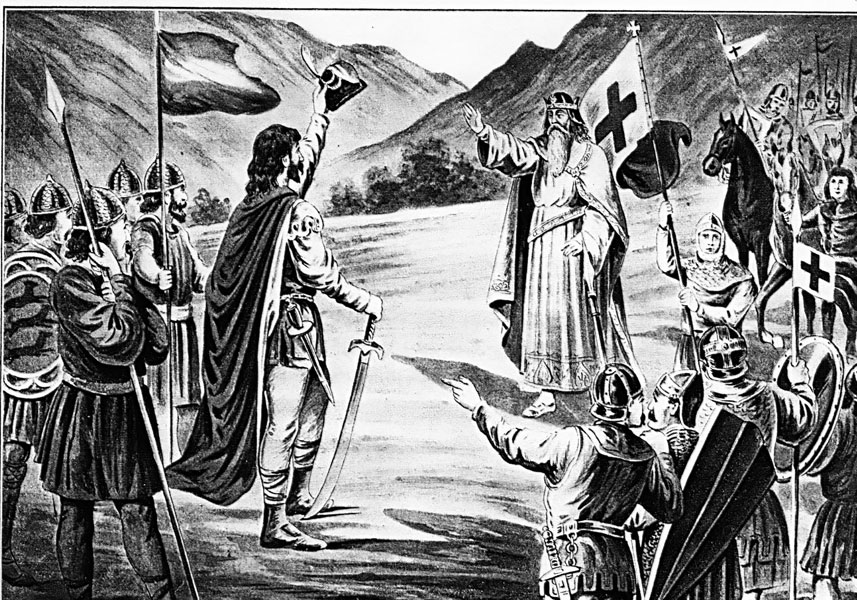
The 1189 Meeting of Stefan Nemanja and Frederick Barbarossa (19th century) by Kosta Mandrović

Meanwhile, Ayyubid sultan Ṣalāḥ al-Dīn captured Jerusalem in 1187. Due to the fall of Jerusalem in the Latin West, there was a great commotion that started the Third Crusade. A large crusader army led by Holy Roman Emperor Frederick Barbarossa marched in 1189 from Buda through Belgrade and Niš to Adrianople and Constantinople.

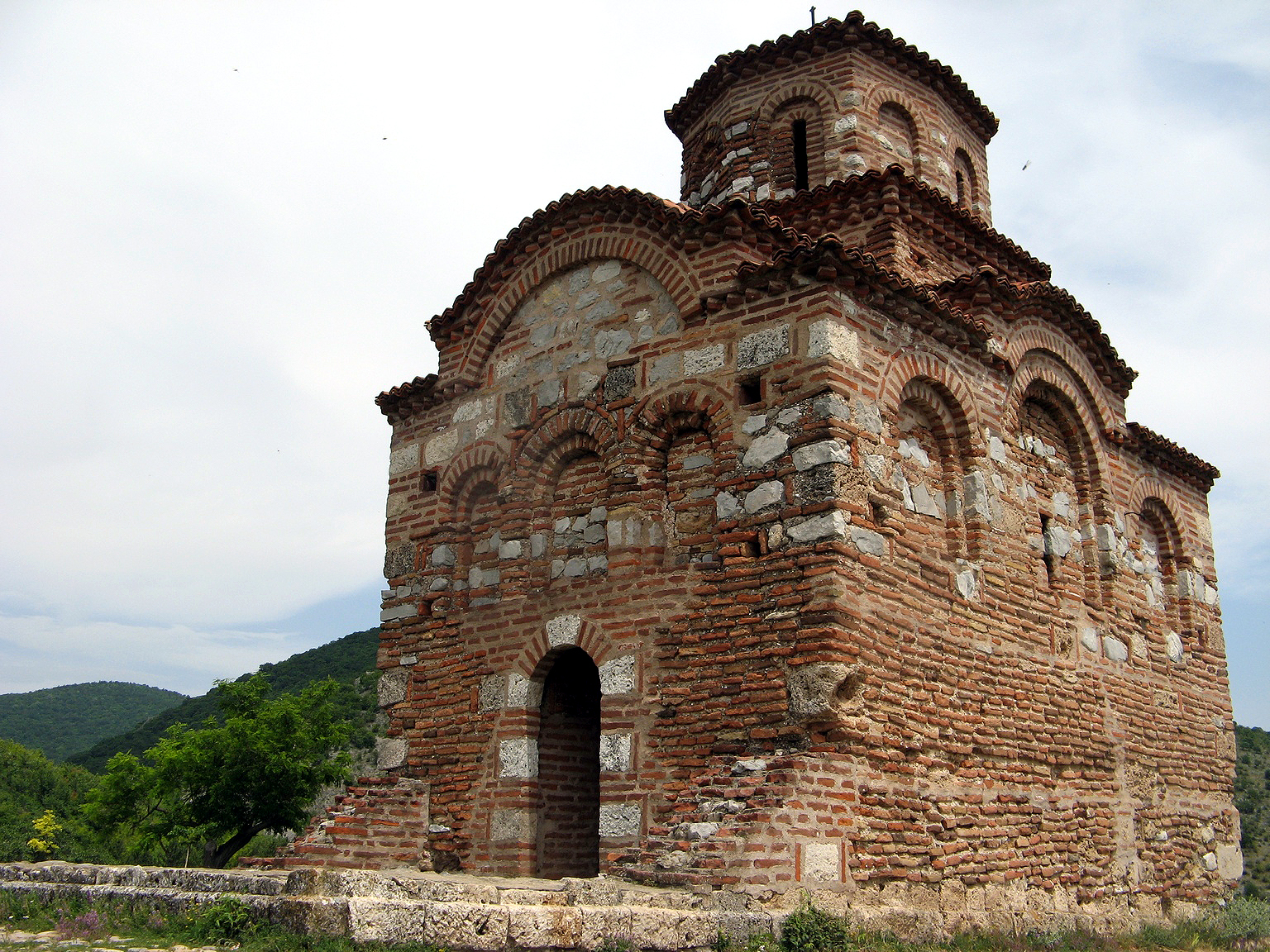
The Church of the Holy Trinity near Niš is part of Byzantine provincial church architecture dating from 11th and 12th centuries. It was built after the reign Basil II (976 - 1025) and Restoration of Byzantium, most likely in the second half of the 11th century. The Church is modest one-nave building in the shape of an elongated inscribed cross with a dome. It is a central-type building whose model should be recognized in the Hagia Sophia, Thessaloniki.

In Niš, in the new capital of Stefan Nemanja, the German emperor and the grand zoupan met at the end of July 1189. At the meeting, Nemanja asked Barbarossa for the Crusaders to promise him lands the Serbians recently conquered in exchange of aiding the Crusaders in war against Byzantium. However, Barbarossa rejected this proposal in a diplomatic manner, wanting to ensure only a safe passage for his army through Byzantium. His main goal, however, remained the liberation of Jerusalem.

A month later, negotiations began between the Crusaders and the Byzantines over the passage with great tension. At that time, according to Christian doctrine, there could be only one emperor in the Christian world. Hence the great rivalry and tension between the Eastern Roman Empire (historiographically known as Byzantium) and the Holy Roman Empire. The Crusaders captured Philippopolis and Adrianople and prepared for an attack on Constantinople. Nemanja takes advantage of this situation and launches an offensive towards Byzantine Skopje. Meanwhile, in February 1190, an agreement was reached between the two emperors at Adrianople to allow the Crusader army to cross the Dardanelles. During the uncertain negotiations, Emperor Isaac II replied that the new friendship between the Crusaders and the Serbs was very difficult for him.

In June 1190, Frederick Barbarossa drowned in the river Saleph. At the same time, Byzantine Emperor Isaac II Angelos launched a punitive expedition against the Serbs, and Nemanja was defeated in the battle at South Morava (1191). In fact, Constantinople did not want to subdue the Serbs, but to regain Niš and the main road to Belgrade, as well as to make allies of the rebellious Serbs. The peace treaty in 1193 provided for Stefan Nemanjić, the middle son of the Grand Župan Stefan Nemanja, to marry a Byzantine princess Eudokia Angelina, i.e. niece of the Byzantine emperor.

== Return to Byzantium ==
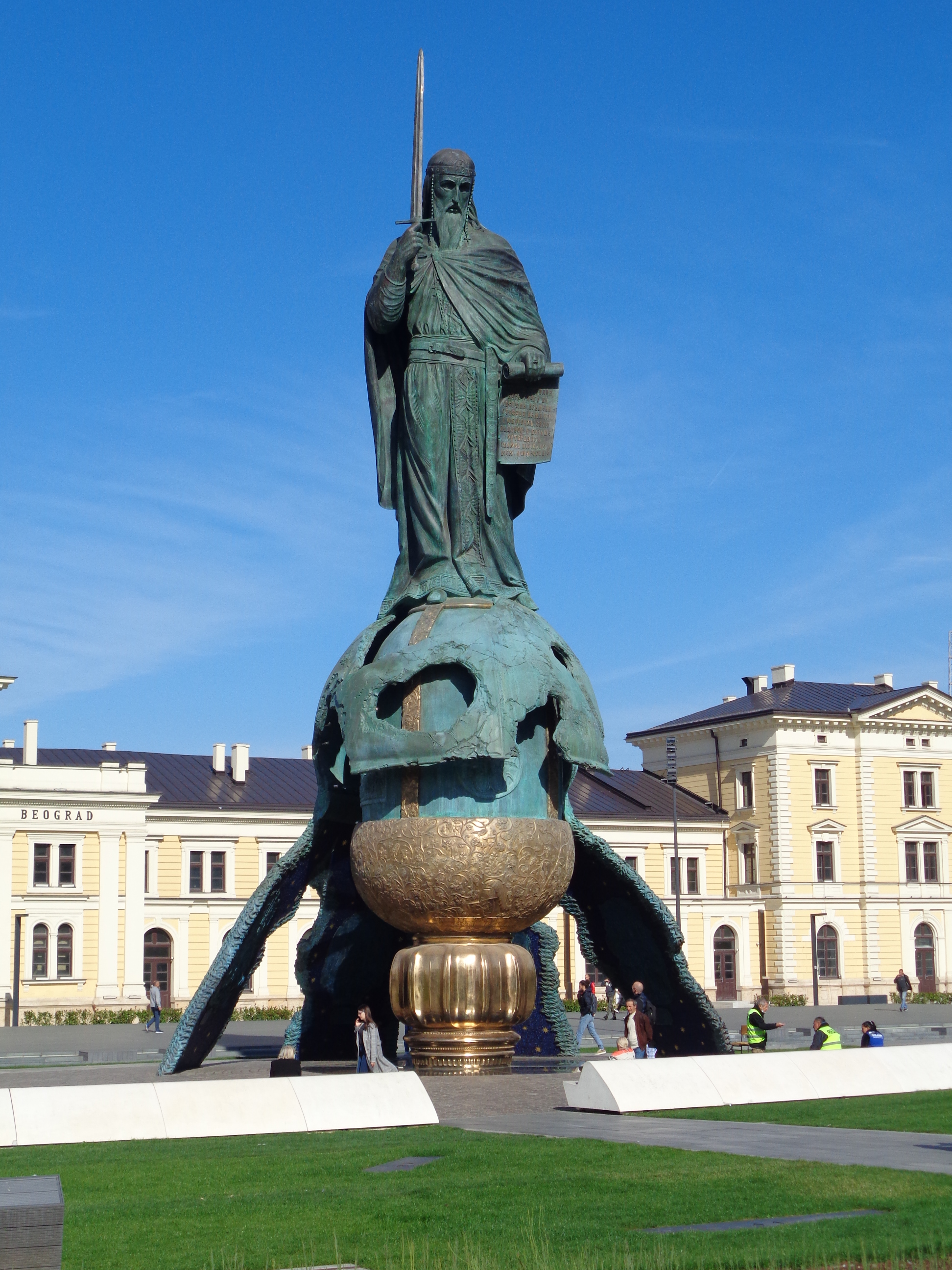
23-metre (75 ft) monument of Stefan Nemanja, Belgrade, 2021

The concluded peace envisaged that Nemanja would be succeeded by his middle son Stefan, who received the Byzantine title of sebastokrator and the Byzantine princess Eudokia for a wife, and not the firstborn Vukan.

In November 1192, on the way to Venice, from Acre via Byzantine Corfu to the southeastern Adriatic coast on the small island of Lokrum near Dubrovnik (Ragusa), Richard I arrived incognito as an ordinary knight or pilgrim, where he revealed that he is the King of England. Hungarian king Béla invaded Serbia at the beginning of 1193. Emperor Isaac II demanded the withdrawal of his troops, and threatened Béla with war. At the same time, Doge Enrico Dandolo attempted to occupy Hungarian Zara, but failed. In April 1195, the father-in-law of Stefan Nemanjić, Alexius III Angelus (1195–1203), overthrew his brother Emperor Isaac II and took power.

In 1196, at the state assembly near Church of Saints Peter and Paul in Ras, Stefan Nemanja abdicated the throne in favor of his middle son Stefan, who became the grand prince of Serbia. He left his eldest son Vukan in charge of Zeta, Travunija, Hvosno and Toplica. Nemanja became a monk in his old age and was given the name Simeon. Shortly afterwards, he went to Byzantium, to Mount Athos, where his youngest son Sava had been a monk for some time. They received permission from the new Byzantine emperor to rebuild the abandoned monastery of Hilandar.

== Death and legacy ==
Knowing his death was near in his 86th year, Simeon asked to be placed on a mat in front of the icon of the Virgin Hodegetria with a stone for his pillow. He died in front of his son Sava and other monks, on 13 February 1199. He was buried in the grounds of Hilandar monastery. His last words requested that Sava take his remains to Serbia, "when God permits it, after a certain period of time". Sava later wrote the Liturgy of Saint Simeon in Nemanja's honour.

In 1206, Sava decided to bring his father's remains to Serbia, where his brothers Stefan and Vukan were fighting among themselves, thus tearing apart the Serbian lands their father had reunited. Upon arrival of Sava, his brothers made peace and Simeon was re-buried in 1207 in his personal foundation, the Studenica Monastery, where holy oil (myrrh) started to seeped, from his new grave, thus giving Simeon the epithet the Myrrh-streaming. Because of miracles that occurred at his grave, the Serbian Orthodox Church canonised him, and declared his feast-day on 26 February [O.S. 13 February]. The cult of St. Simeon helped consolidate Serbian national identity. Centers of his cult are in monasteries of Studenica and Hilandar.

== Name and title ==
Various names have been used to refer to Stefan Nemanja, including Stefan I and the Latin Stephanus Nemania. Sometimes the spelling of his name is anglicised, to become Stephen Nemanya. In the latter part of his life, he became a monk and hence was referred to as Monk Simeon, or Monk Symeon. After his death, he was canonised by the Orthodox Church, and became St. Symeon the Myrrh-streaming. His son and successor, Stefan the First-Crowned, called him "The Gatherer of the Lost Pieces of the Land of his Grandfathers, and also their Rebuilder". His other son Sava, called him "Our Lord and Autocrat, and ruler of the whole Serbian land". In a way, both sons introduced the cult of their father, thus creating the ideal picture of a ruler-saint, without parallel in Byzantium.

== Family ==
Nemanja was married to a Serb noblewoman by the name of Ana. They had three sons and three daughters:

- Vukan Nemanjić – Prince of Doclea and briefly Anti- Grand Prince of Serbia (1202–1204)
- Stefan Nemanjić - (Stefan "the First-Crowned"), Nemanja's successor, first King of All Serbian lands, 1196–1228
- Rastko Nemanjić - (as a monk named Sava; Saint Sava) (1171–1236) – The first Autocephalous- Archbishop and saint of the Serbian Orthodox Church
- Vuka (as a nun Efimija (Euphemia))
- N. (unknown daughter) - Married to Manuel Komnenos Doukas Angelos, ruler of Epiros (firstly with title despot, after that with title emperor (serbian: tzar (car)))
- N. (her name is unknown) - A daughter married Bulgarian nobleman N. (Unknown; maybe Tihomir? or Tih?) Asen, mother of Bulgarian emperor Konstantin Tih (r. 1257–1277)

== Foundations ==
Stefan Nemanja founded, restored and reconstructed several monasteries. He also established the Raška architectural school, that spanned from 1170 to 1300.

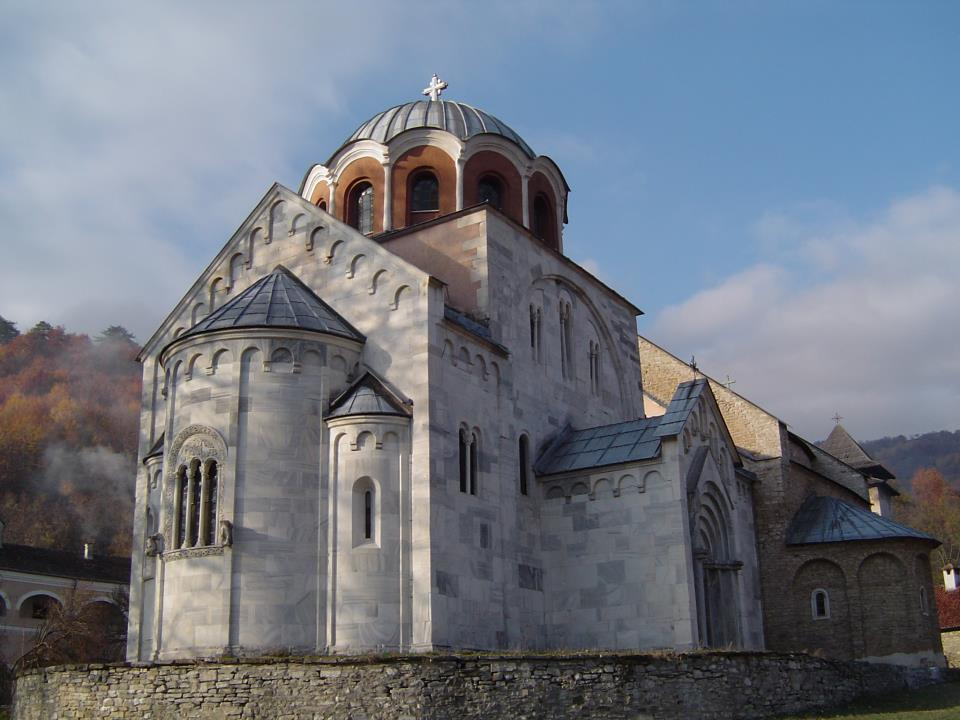
Studenica Monastery church Dormition of the Theotokos at the confluence of the Studenica and the Ibar River. This is the fourth Nemanja endowment, built by the best masons from the Adriatic coast around 1186. The frescoes were painted by the best Greek masters around 1208.

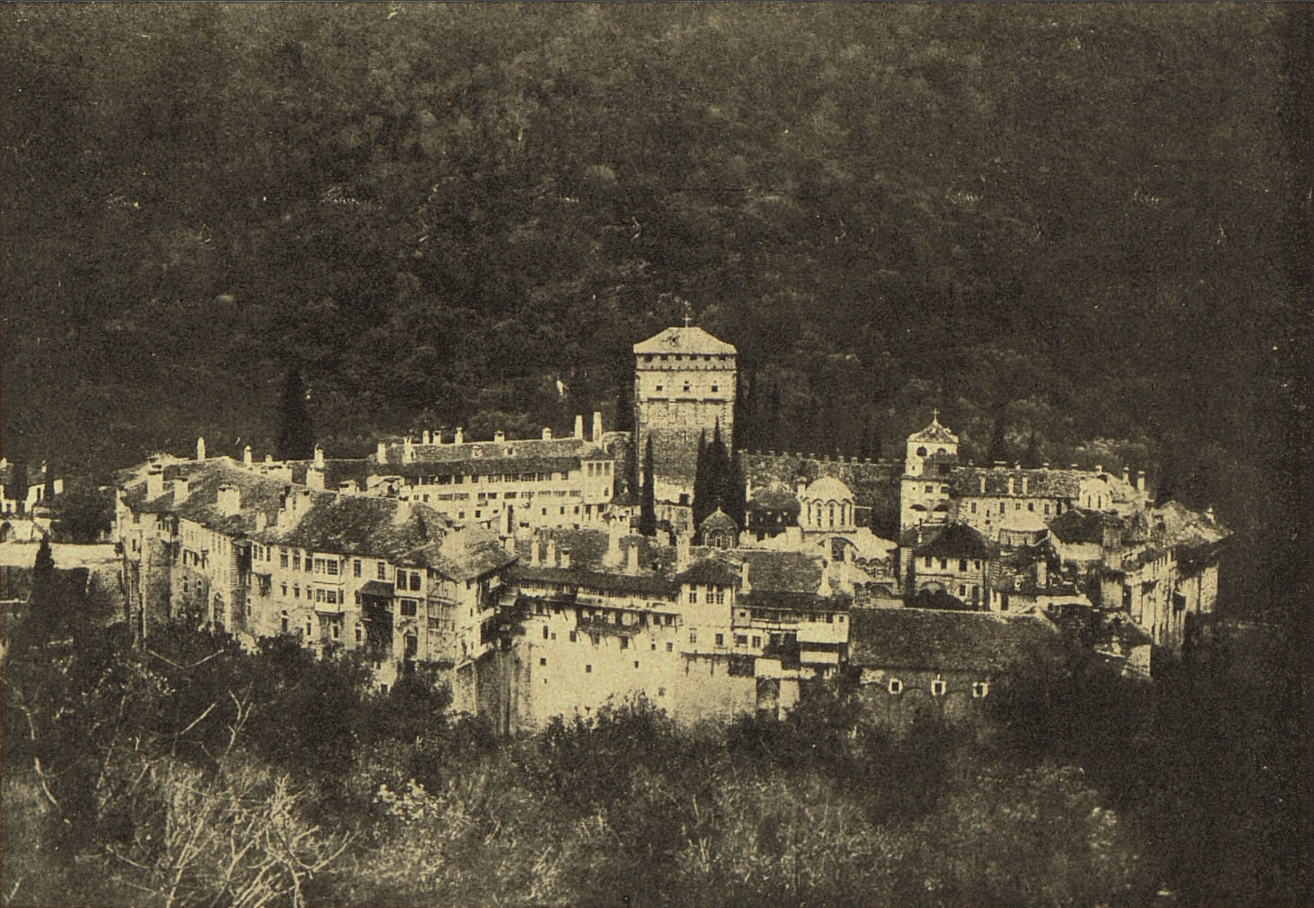
Hilandar Monastery on Mount Athos

- Monastery of Saint Nicholas, in Kuršumlija
- Monastery of Saint Mother of Christ, between Kosanica and Toplica
- Đurđevi Stupovi Monastery, in 1171 in Ras
- Studenica Monastery, in 1190 in Ibar
- Church of the Holy Mother of God, at the confluence of the Bistrica and the Lim
- Monastery of Saint Nicholas, in Kaznovići/Končulj on the Ibar
- Nunnery of Mother of Christ, in Ras

=== Reconstructions ===
- Hilandar Monastery on Mount Athos, in 1199
- Monastery of Saint Archangel Michael, in Skopje
- Monastery of Saint Pantheleimon, in Niš

=== Donations ===
- Church of Lord, Holy Grave and Christ's Arrisal, in Jerusalem
- Church of Saint John the Forerunner, in Jerusalem
- Church of Saint Theodosios, in the Desert of Bethlehem
- Church Saint Apostole Peter and Paul, in Rome
- Church of Saint Nicholas, in Bari
- Monastery/Church of the Virgin of Evergethide, in Constantinople
- Monastery/Church of Saint Demetrios, in Thessalonika

== See also ==
- Battle of Pantina
- History of Serbia; List of Serbian monarchs
- History of Montenegro; List of rulers of Montenegro
- History of Herzegovina

== Sources ==
- Bataković, Dušan T., ed. (2005). Histoire du peuple serbe [History of the Serbian People] (in French). Lausanne: L’Age d’Homme. ISBN 9782825119587.
- Ćirković, Sima; Korać, Vojislav; Babić, Gordana (1986). Studenica Monastery. Belgrade: Jugoslovenska revija.
- Ćirković, Sima (2004). The Serbs. Malden: Blackwell Publishing. ISBN 9781405142915.
- Curta, Florin (2006). Southeastern Europe in the Middle Ages, 500–1250. Cambridge: Cambridge University Press. ISBN 9780521815390.
- Curta, Florin (2019). Eastern Europe in the Middle Ages (500-1300). Leiden and Boston: Brill. ISBN 9789004395190.
- Dvornik, Francis (1962). The Slavs in European History and Civilization. New Brunswick: Rutgers University Press. ISBN 9780813507996.
- Fine, John Van Antwerp Jr. (1991) [1983]. The Early Medieval Balkans: A Critical Survey from the Sixth to the Late Twelfth Century. Ann Arbor, Michigan: University of Michigan Press. ISBN 0472081497.
- Fine, John Van Antwerp Jr. (1994) [1987]. The Late Medieval Balkans: A Critical Survey from the Late Twelfth Century to the Ottoman Conquest. Ann Arbor, Michigan: University of Michigan Press. ISBN 0472082604.
- Ivanović, Miloš (2019). "Serbian Hagiographies on the Warfare and Political Struggles of the Nemanjić Dynasty (from the Twelfth to Fourteenth Century)". Reform and Renewal in Medieval East and Central Europe: Politics, Law and Society. Cluj-Napoca: Romanian Academy, Center for Transylvanian Studies. pp. 103–129.
- Ivić, Pavle, ed. (1995). The History of Serbian Culture. Edgware: Porthill Publishers. ISBN 9781870732314.
- Jireček, Constantin (1911). Geschichte der Serben. Vol. 1. Gotha: Perthes.
- Jireček, Constantin (1918). Geschichte der Serben. Vol. 2. Gotha: Perthes.
- Kalić, Jovanka (2017). "The First Coronation Churches of Medieval Serbia". Balcanica (48): 7–18. doi:10.2298/BALC1748007K. hdl:21.15107/rcub_dais_4886.
- Kinnamos, John (22 December 1976). Deeds of John and Manuel Comnenus. Translated by Charles M. Brand. New York: Columbia University Press. ISBN 978-0-231-52155-0.
- Komatina, Ivana (2018). "On the attack of the Hungarian king Bela III on Serbia in light of the letter of emperor Isaac II to pope Celestine III". Facta Universitatis: Philosophy, Sociology, Psychology and History. 17 (2): 105–110. Archived from the original on 2020-09-01.
- Laurent, Vitalien (1941). "La Serbie entre Byzance et la Hongrie, à la veille de la quatrième Croisade". Revue historique du sud-est européen. 18: 109–130.
- Marjanović-Dušanić, Smilja (2006). "Lʹ idéologie monarchique dans les chartes de la dynastie serbe des Némanides (1168-1371): Étude diplomatique". Archiv für Diplomatik: Schriftgeschichte, Siegel- und Wappenkunde. 52: 149–158. doi:10.7788/afd.2006.52.jg.149. S2CID 96483243.
- Nikolov, Alexandar (2011). "Stephen Nemanja and the Foundation of the Second Bulgarian Empire: 1183-1190". Стефан Немања и Топлица: Тематски зборник. Ниш: Центар за црквене студије. pp. 59–69.
- Obolensky, Dimitri (1974) [1971]. The Byzantine Commonwealth: Eastern Europe, 500-1453. London: Cardinal. ISBN 9780351176449.
- Orbini, Mauro (1601). Il Regno de gli Slavi hoggi corrottamente detti Schiavoni. Pesaro: Apresso Girolamo Concordia.
- Орбин, Мавро (1968). Краљевство Словена. Београд: Српска књижевна задруга.
- Ostrogorsky, George (1956). History of the Byzantine State. Oxford: Basil Blackwell.
- Pavlowitch, Stevan K. (2002). Serbia: The History behind the Name. London: Hurst & Company. ISBN 9781850654773.
- Polemis, Demetrios I. (1968). The Doukai: A Contribution to Byzantine Prosopography. London: The Athlone Press. ISBN 9780485131222.
- Ružičić, Gojko (1967). "The Birth Year of Stephan Nemanya". To Honor Roman Jakobson: Essays on the Occasion of His 70. Birthday. Vol. 3. Mouton: The Hague. pp. 1704–1708. ISBN 9783111349138.
- Samardžić, Radovan; Duškov, Milan, eds. (1993). Serbs in European Civilization. Belgrade: Nova, Serbian Academy of Sciences and Arts, Institute for Balkan Studies. ISBN 9788675830153.
- Sedlar, Jean W. (1994). East Central Europe in the Middle Ages, 1000-1500. Seattle: University of Washington Press. ISBN 9780295800646.
- Stanković, Vlada, ed. (2016). The Balkans and the Byzantine World before and after the Captures of Constantinople, 1204 and 1453. Lanham, Maryland: Lexington Books. ISBN 9781498513265.
- Stephenson, Paul (2004) [2000]. Byzantium's Balkan Frontier: A Political Study of the Northern Balkans, 900–1204. Cambridge University Press. ISBN 978-0-521-77017-0.
- Stephenson, Paul (2008). "Balkan borderlands (1018–1204)". In Shepard, Jonathan (ed.). The Cambridge History of the Byzantine Empire c.500-1492. Cambridge University Press. pp. 664–691. ISBN 9780521832311.
- Stojkovski, Boris; Kartalija, Nebojša (2019). "Serbia through the Eyes of Contemporary Western Travelers in the Age of Nemanjić Dynasty (1166-1371)" (PDF). Deseti međunarodni interdisciplinarni simpozijum Susret kultura: Zbornik radova. Novi Sad: Filozofski fakultet. pp. 305–321.

Stefan Nemanja Nemanjić Dynasty Born: 1114 Died: 13 February 1199
Regnal titles
Preceded by Tihomir	Grand Prince of Serbia; 1166–1196	Succeeded by Stefan Nemanjić
