= Monastery of Saint Nicholas, Kuršumlija =

Monastery in Serbia

Coordinates: 43.1399°N 21.2769°E

Monastery of Saint Nicholas
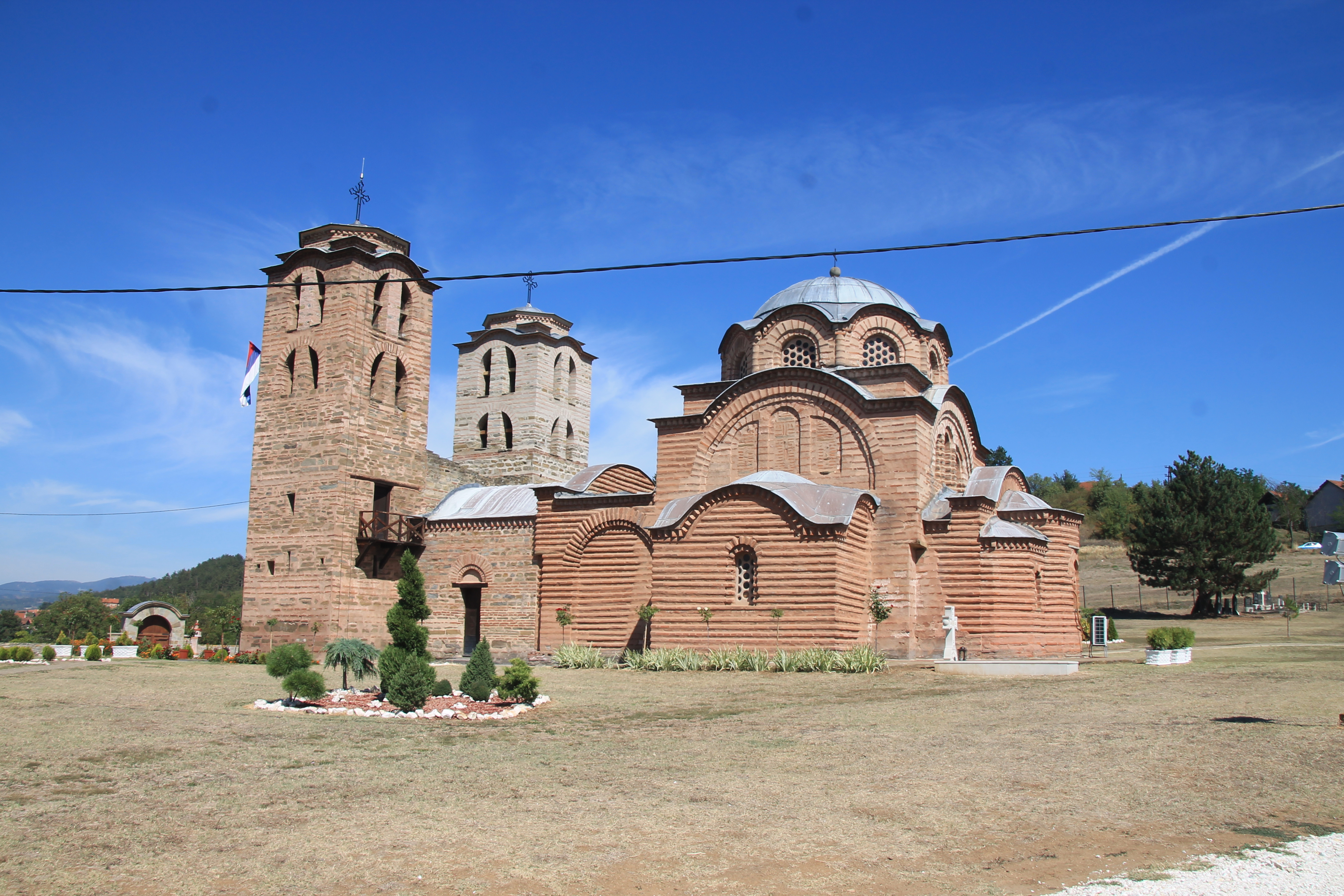
- Monastery of Saint Nicholas
- Interactive map of Monastery of Saint Nicholas
- Location: 18430 Kuršumlija, Serbia

History
- Built: 1166

Cultural Heritage of Serbia
- Type: Cultural Monument of Exceptional Importance
- Designated: 18 November 1947
- Reference no.: SK 207

The Monastery of Saint Nicholas (Serbian: Манастир Светог Николе) is a Serbian Orthodox monastery built by the Grand Prince Stefan Nemanja between 1159 and 1166. It is situated in the center of the historical region of Toplica, near the present day city of Kuršumlija (Serbia), in the upper valley of Toplica river.

It was one of the most important monasteries founded by the Nemanjić dynasty that ruled in Serbia during the Middle Ages. The monastery may be the oldest one founded by Stefan Nemanja.

In the time of its foundation, the Monastery belonged to the Eparchy of Niš. From 1219 up to the first half of the 18th century, the Monastery was the seat of Serbian Orthodox Eparchy of Toplica. Since then, it was merged with the Eparchy of Niš.

== History ==
In the middle of the 12th century, before he became ruler of Serbia, prince Stefan Nemanja governed eastern regions, centered around Toplica. There, he built the Monastery between 1152 and 1166. There is debate over the order in which Nemanja had established his monasteries in Kuršumlija. Domentijan said that the church dedicated to the Virgin was built first, though Stefan's son Saint Sava said the St. Nicholas Church was in fact built first. A conflict began when Nemanja started building monasteries, since his brothers denied that Nemanja had contributed to the work. Despite their arguments Nemanja became the Grand Prince (veliki zupan). Not long after that a palace was built near the monastery. Kuršumlija, then known as Bela Crkva ("White Church"), became the capital of the principality, and was given that name because the buildings were covered in lead roofs that shined white in the sun. After the Serbian Church became autocephalous archbishopric (Nicaea, 1219), the church became the seat of the Eparchy of Toplica.

A Metropolitan bishop of Toplica is also mentioned in the first half of the 16th century, which implies that despite Ottoman occupation, the metropolis still existed and the church headquarters were still in this church. The church was left empty after the Great Serb Migrations of 1690. At some time the Turks started taking the lead from the roof for use in making bullets. The name of the city, Kuršumlija, comes from the Turkish kurşunlu kilise, which means the "lead church". In the 18th century the church was still empty. It was finally torn down in the 19th century, allegedly by Sulj Krveša from Niš and Muli Halil. After this the Arnauts took bricks from the church, and materials were later used to build bakeries and army buildings.

The National Museum in Belgrade took the first steps to repair the church in 1910, and built the roof. After World War II the reconstruction project was continued until 2003 with occasional breaks. The church today is under state protection. It is considered a cultural monument of exceptional importance.

== Architecture ==
As one of the most beautiful monuments of Serbian culture, the church is one of the prototypes of the Raška school. Byzantine influence is visible and also similarities with Hagia Sophia, Nicaea. It was built in three phases. The oldest building has one nave, a three-part altar and a segmented dome. After the establishment of the Eparchy of Toplica in 1219, Stefan the First-Crowned built a narthex with two towers on the west side. The south tower was rebuilt. In the 14th century King Milutin built a chapel on the north side of the church.

The interior is grand and has several rooms. The altar space is separated from the nave and there is no iconostasis. The altar contains two niches. The communion table is made in three pieces and stands in the centre of the altar. The floor of the altar is made of brick tiles. The church has a characteristic brick facade. Every second row is indented and covered with mortar. The single and double doors are made of oak wood and rotate around metal axles.

The interior of the church is plastered and frescoed. A small number of original frescoes from the 14th century are preserved on the window dome and the chapel of south tower. Apart from fragments of some frescoes showing bishop and Virgin, the church is not painted today.

== Gallery ==
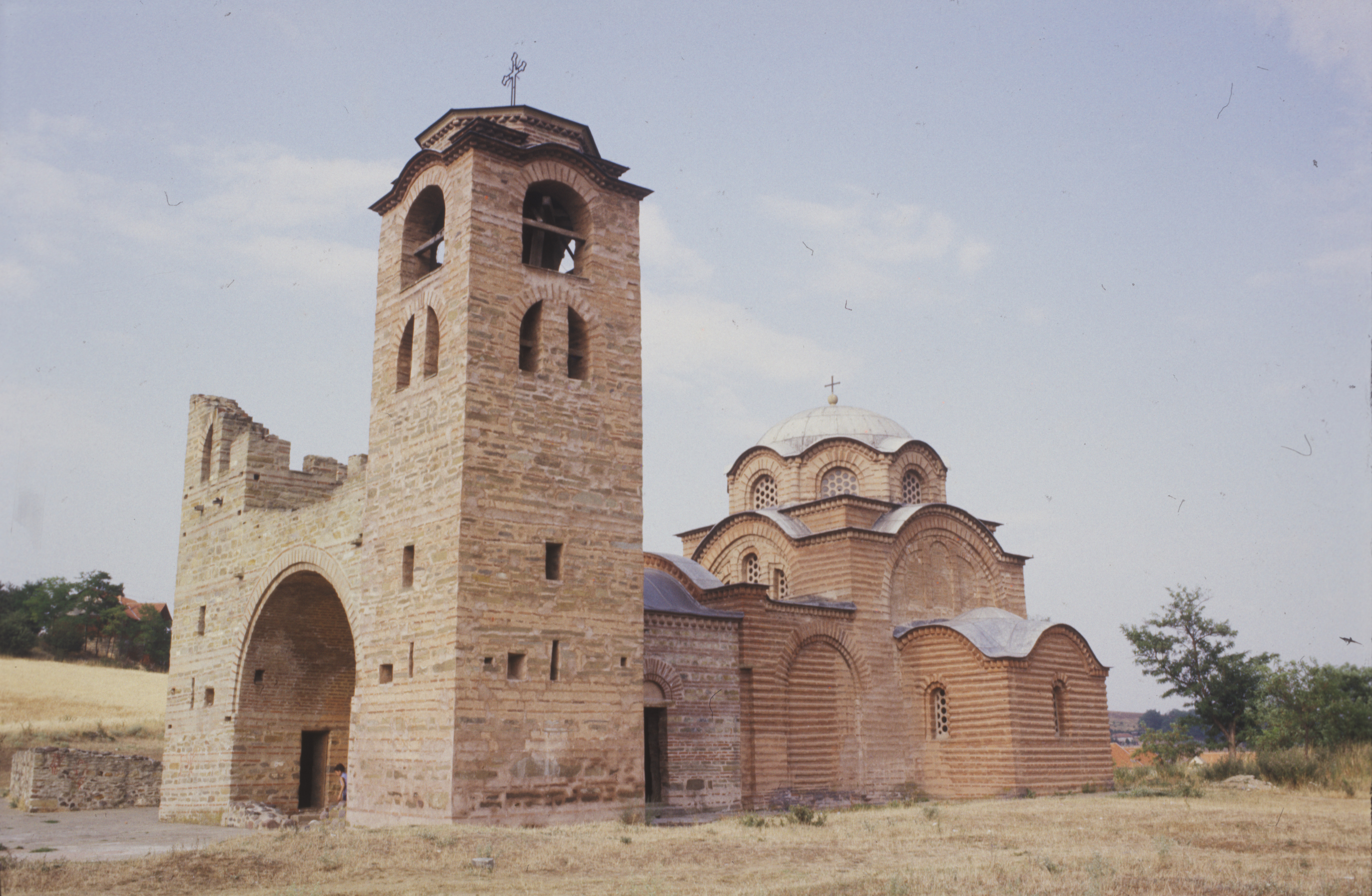
Post-restoration photo of Church of Saint Nicholas near Kuršumlija

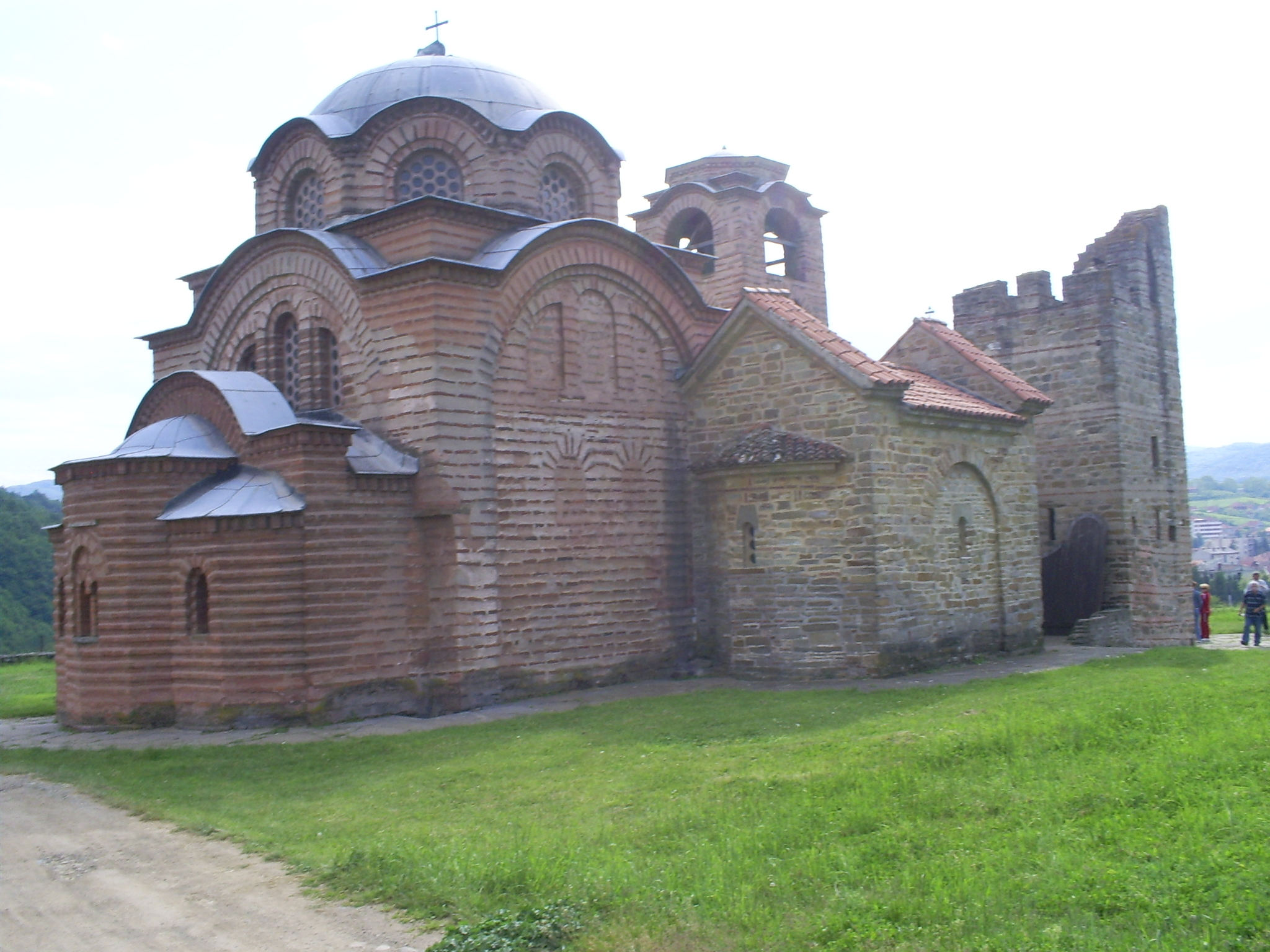

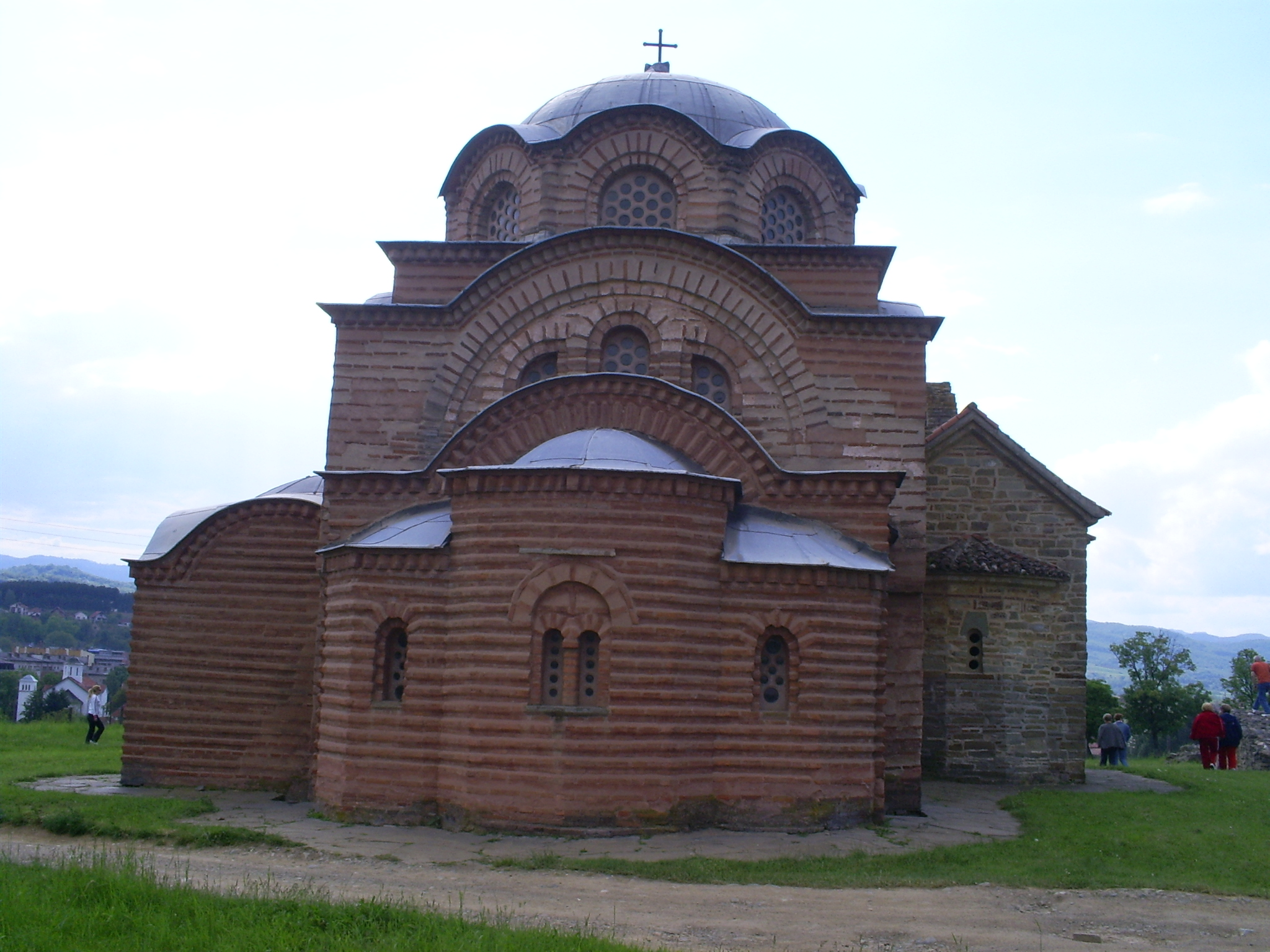

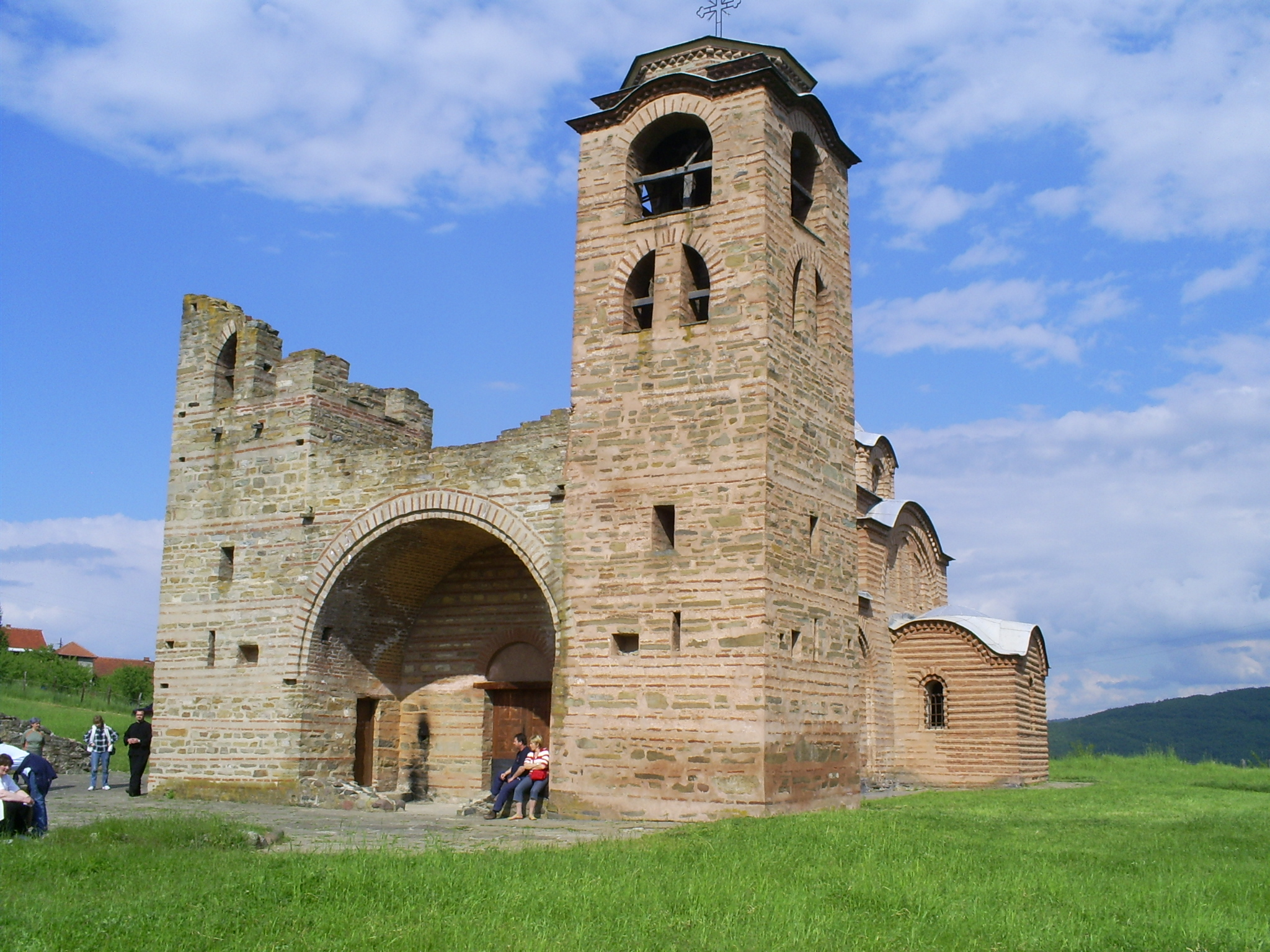

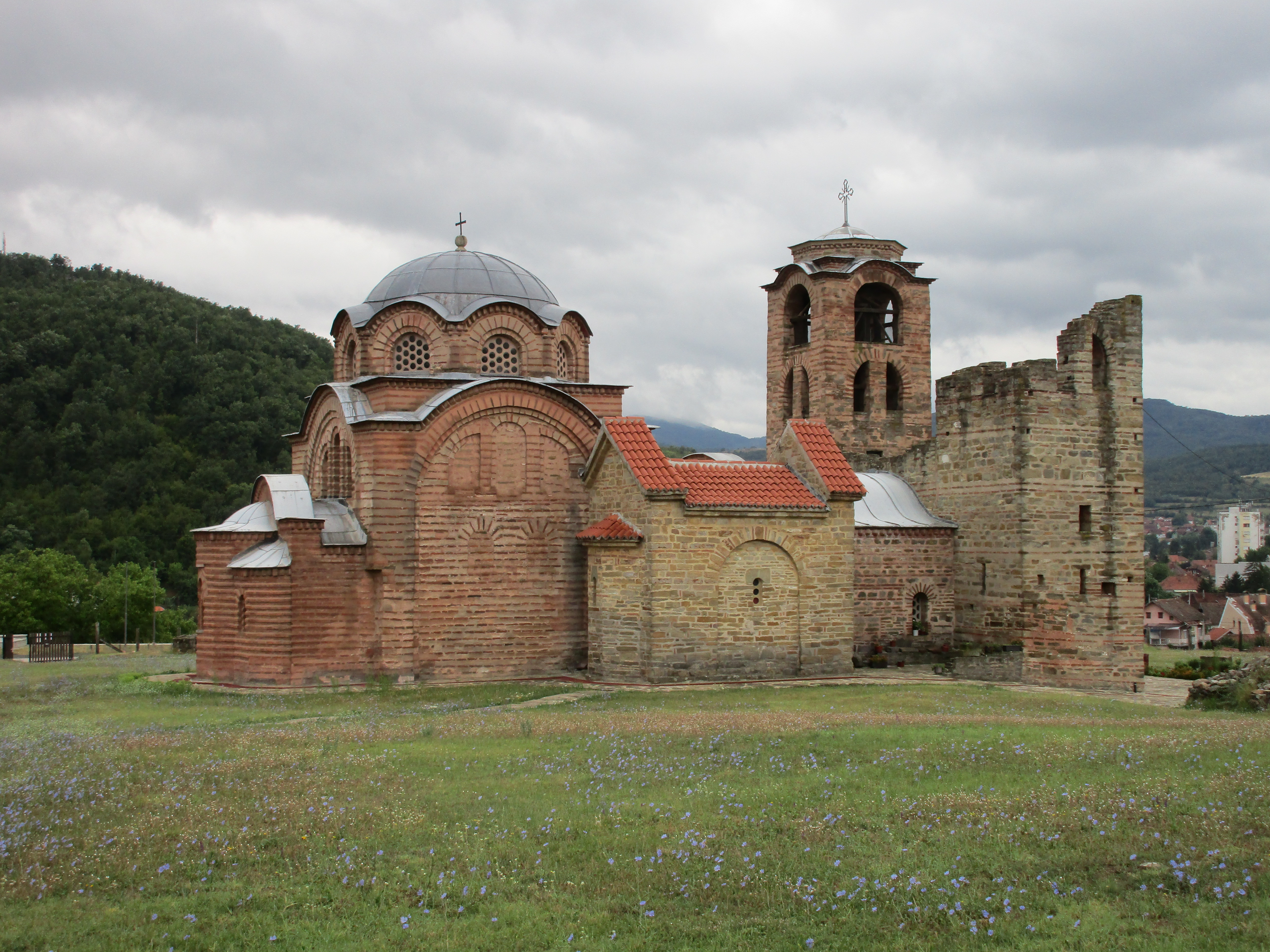

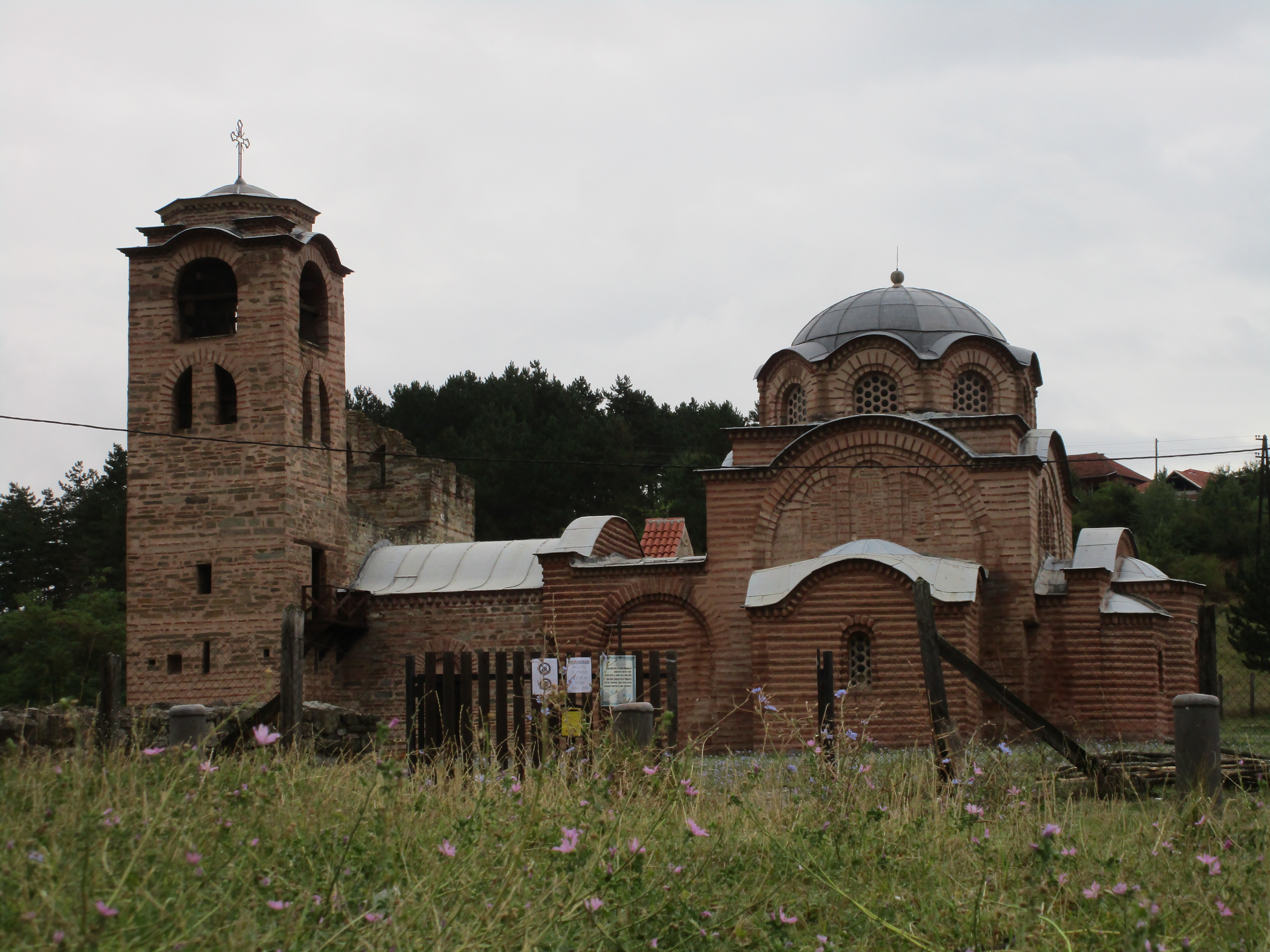

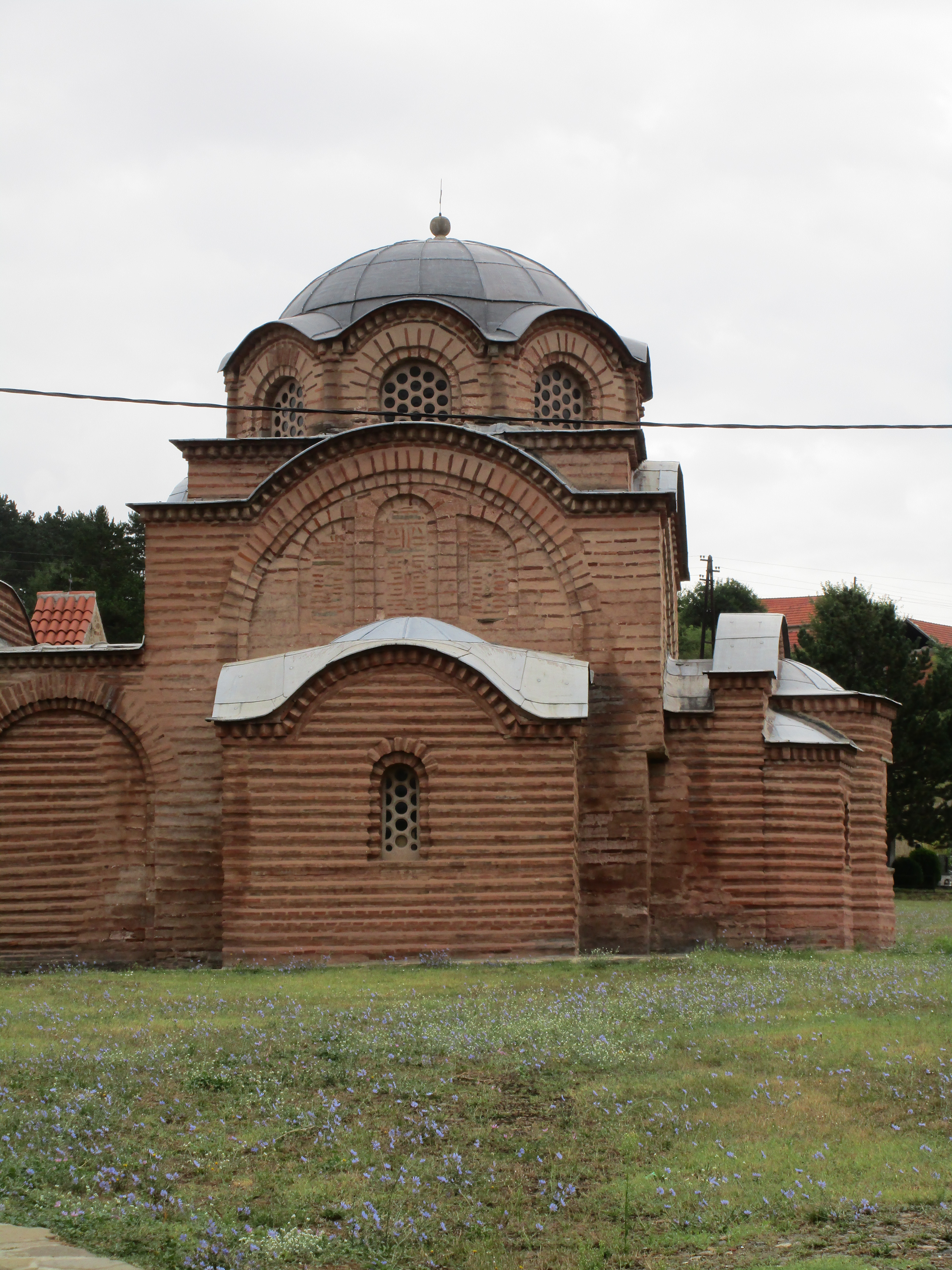

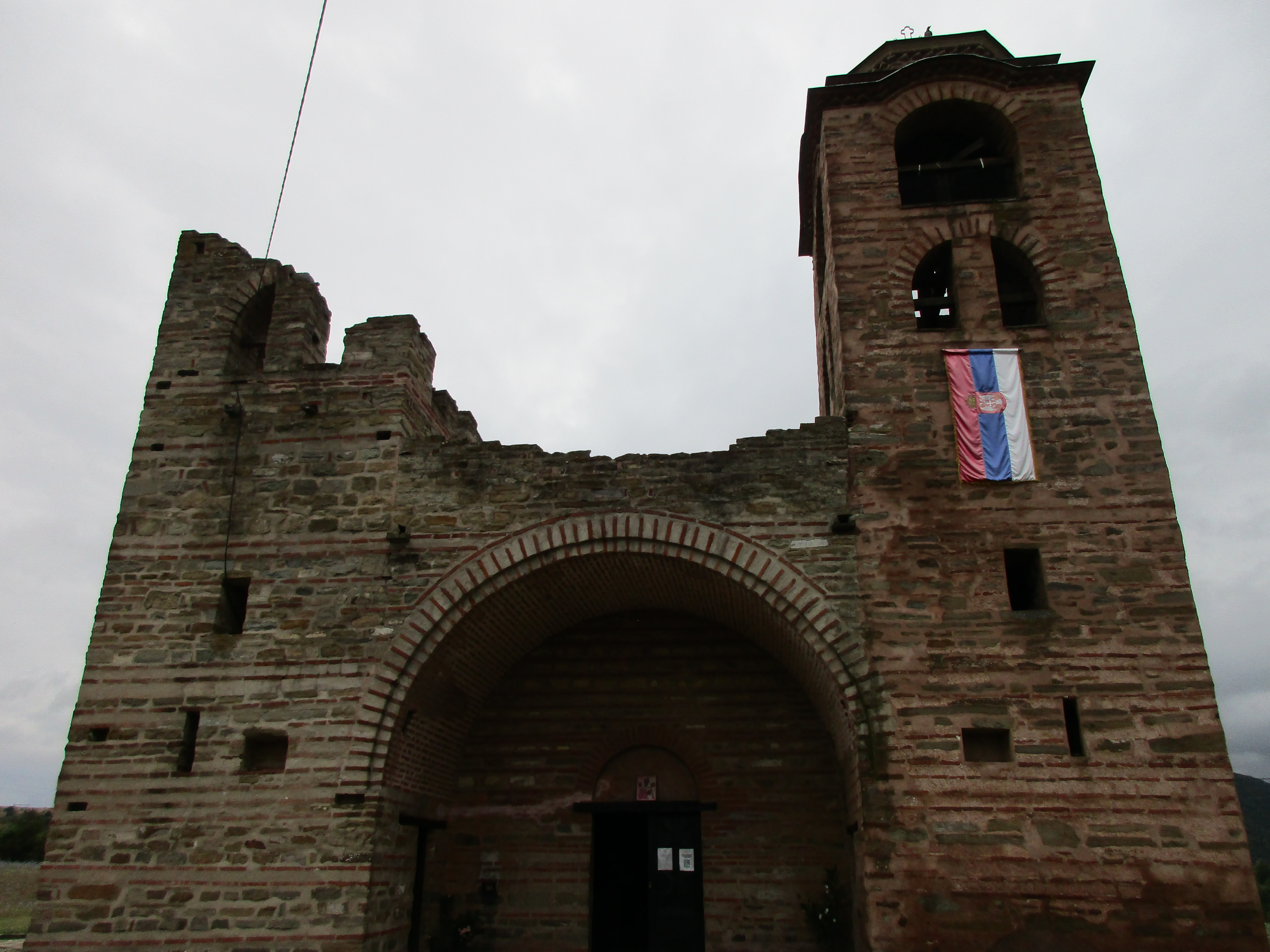

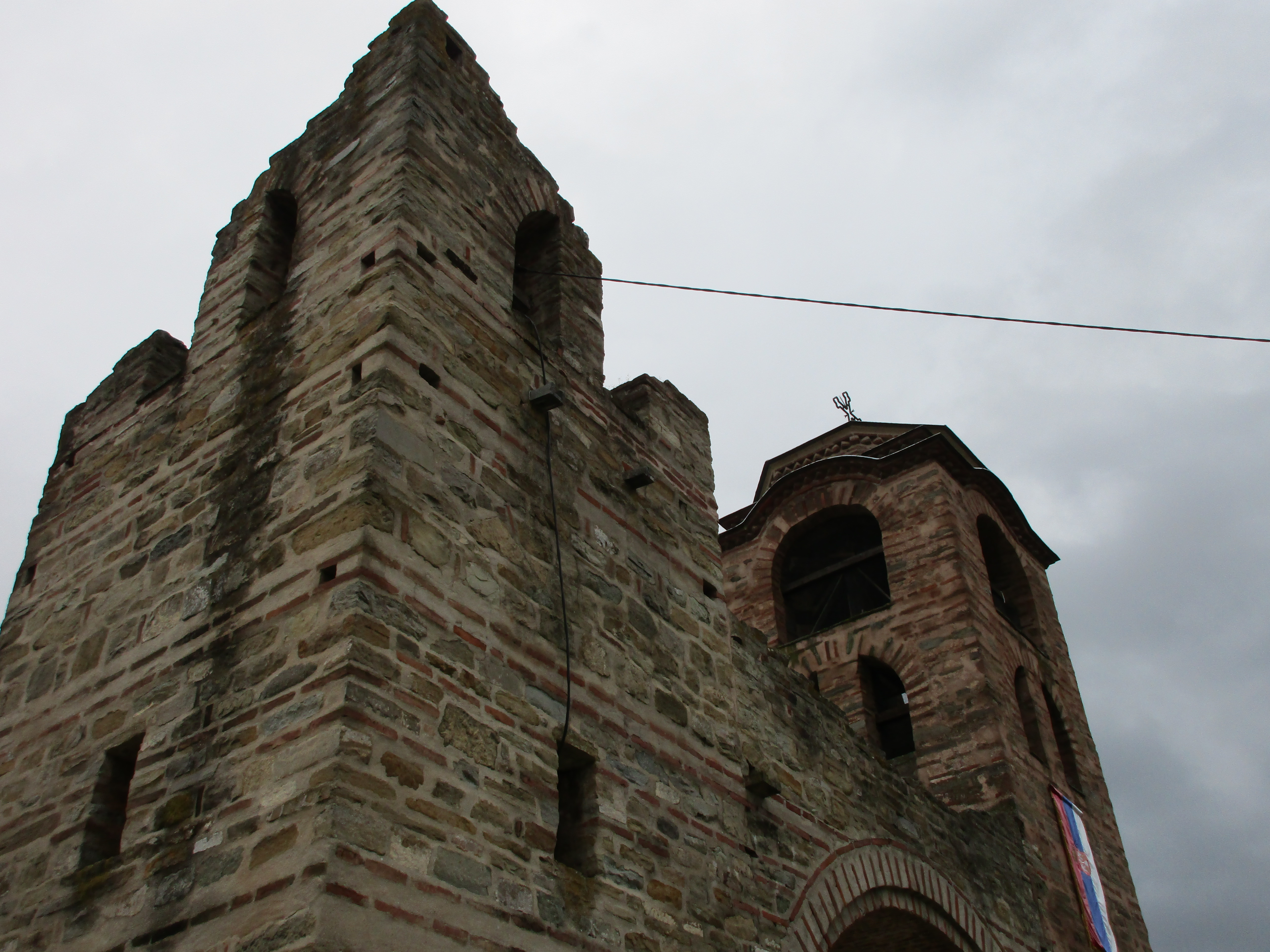

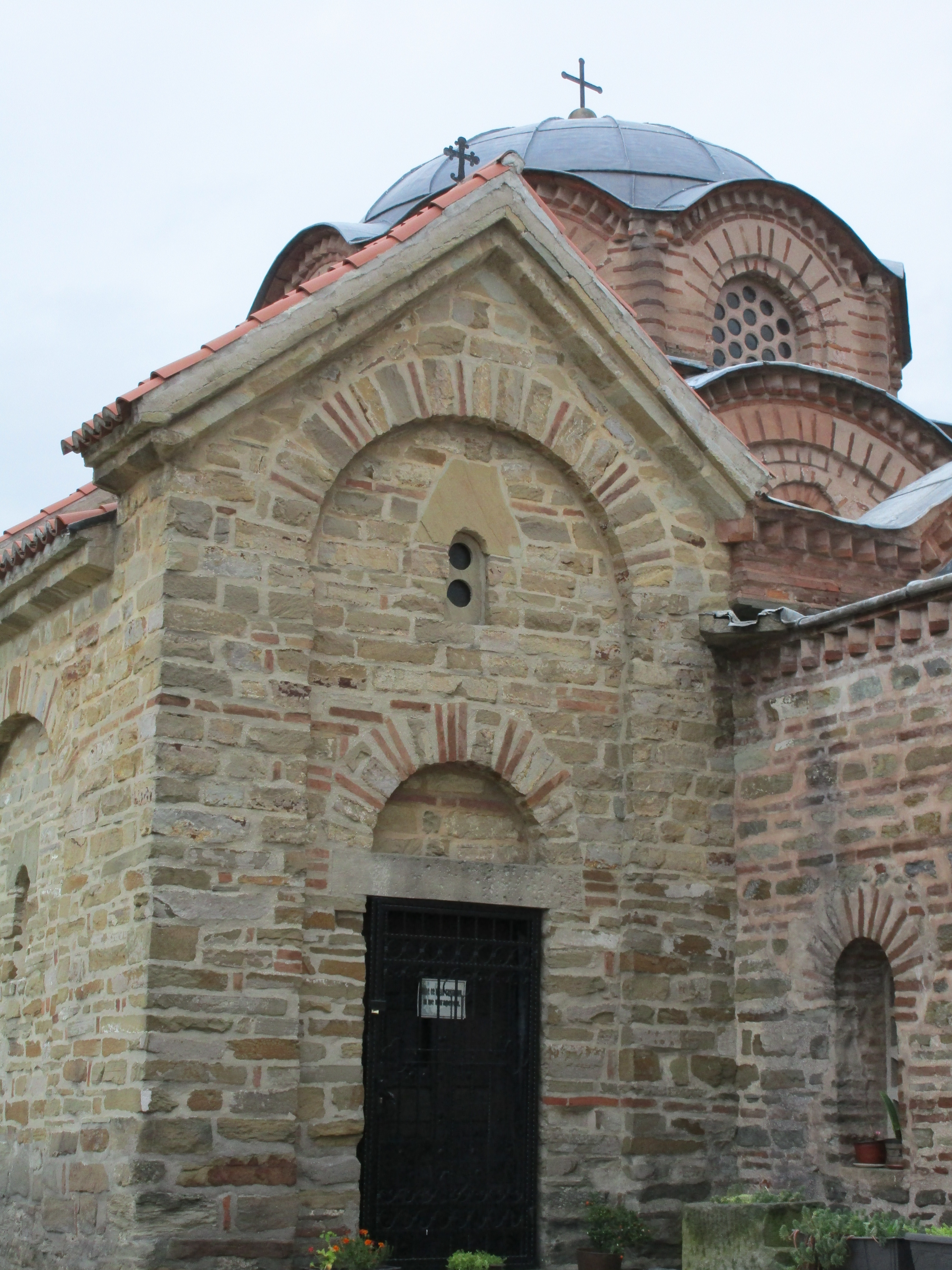

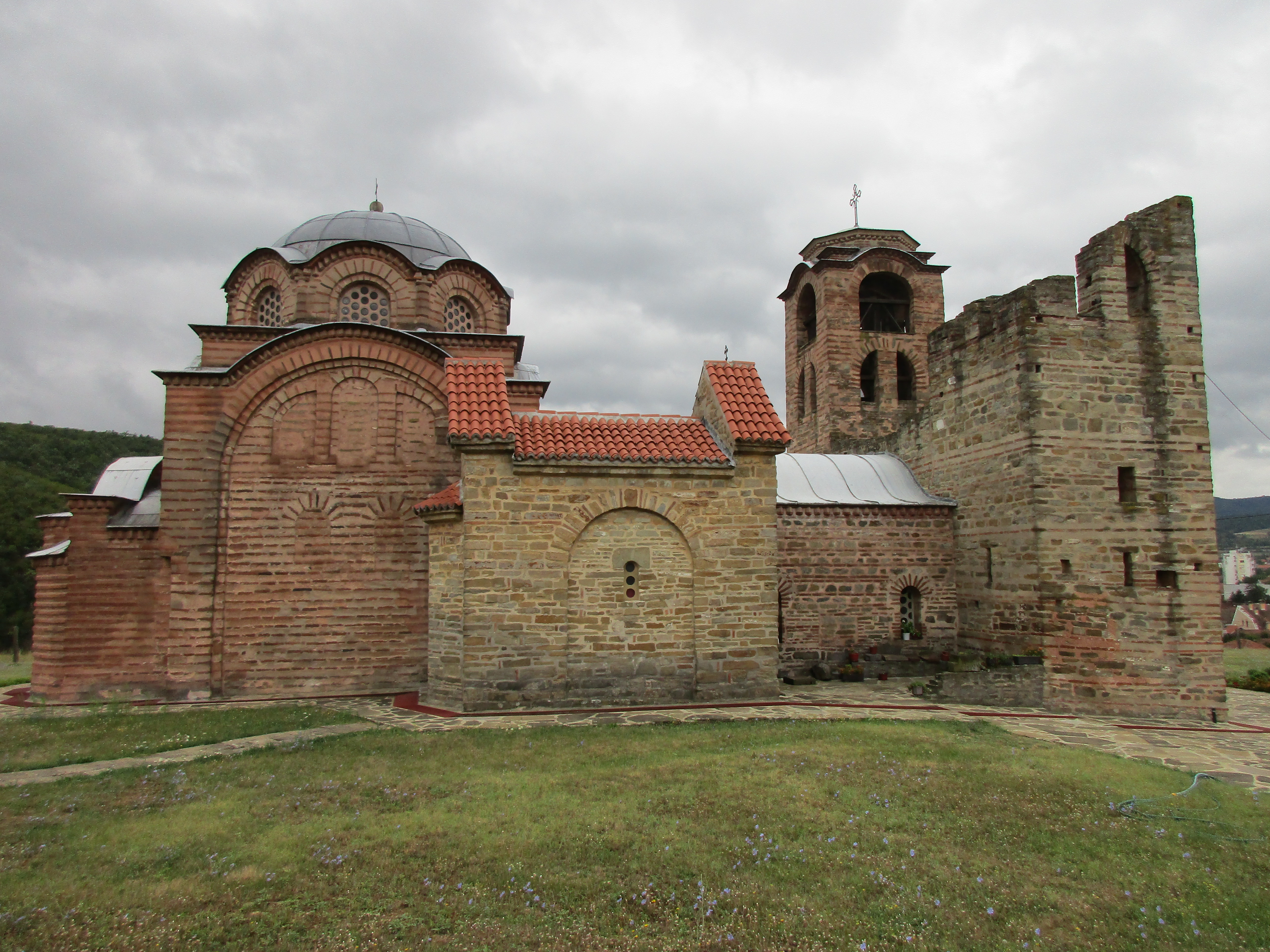

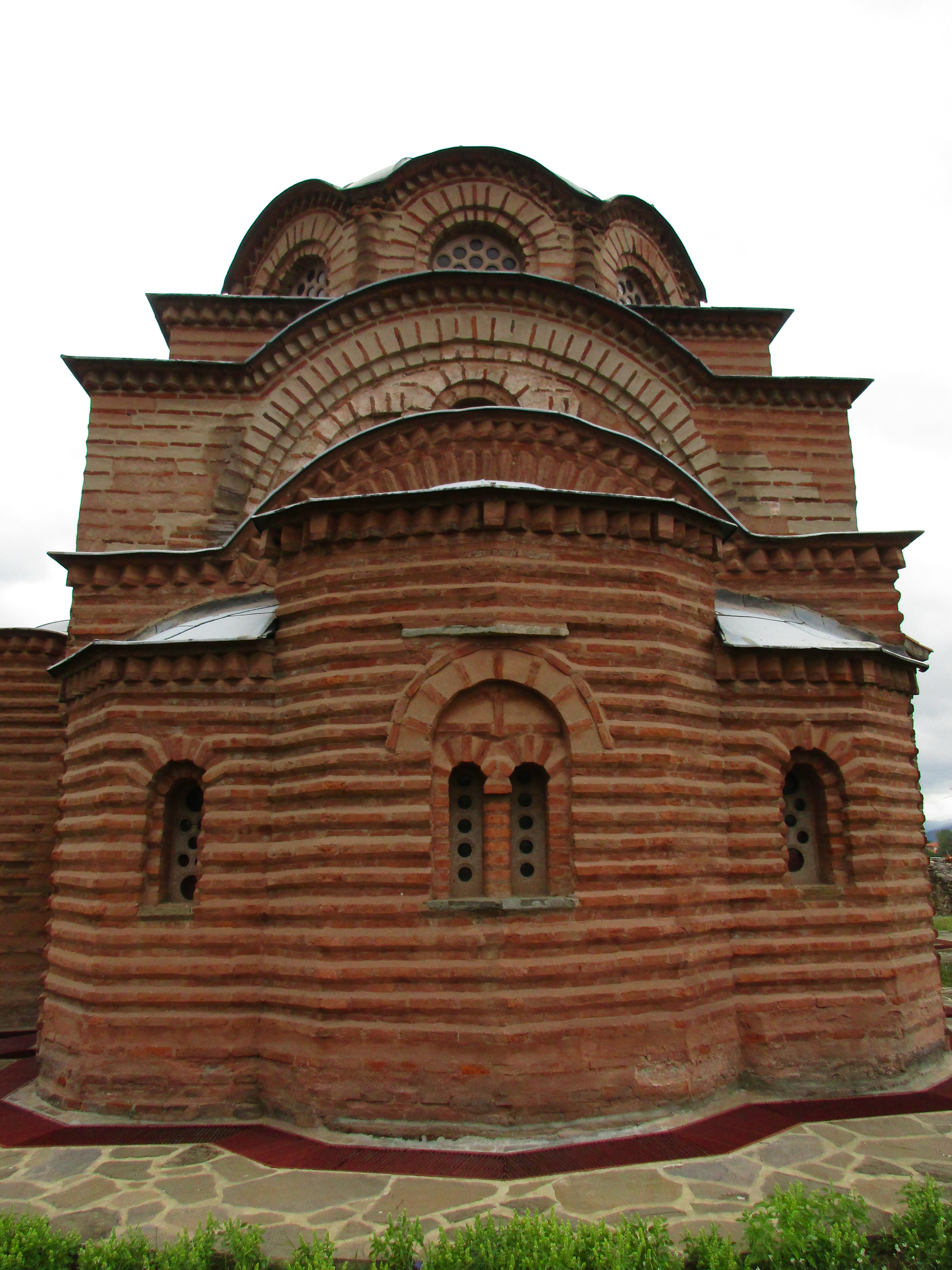

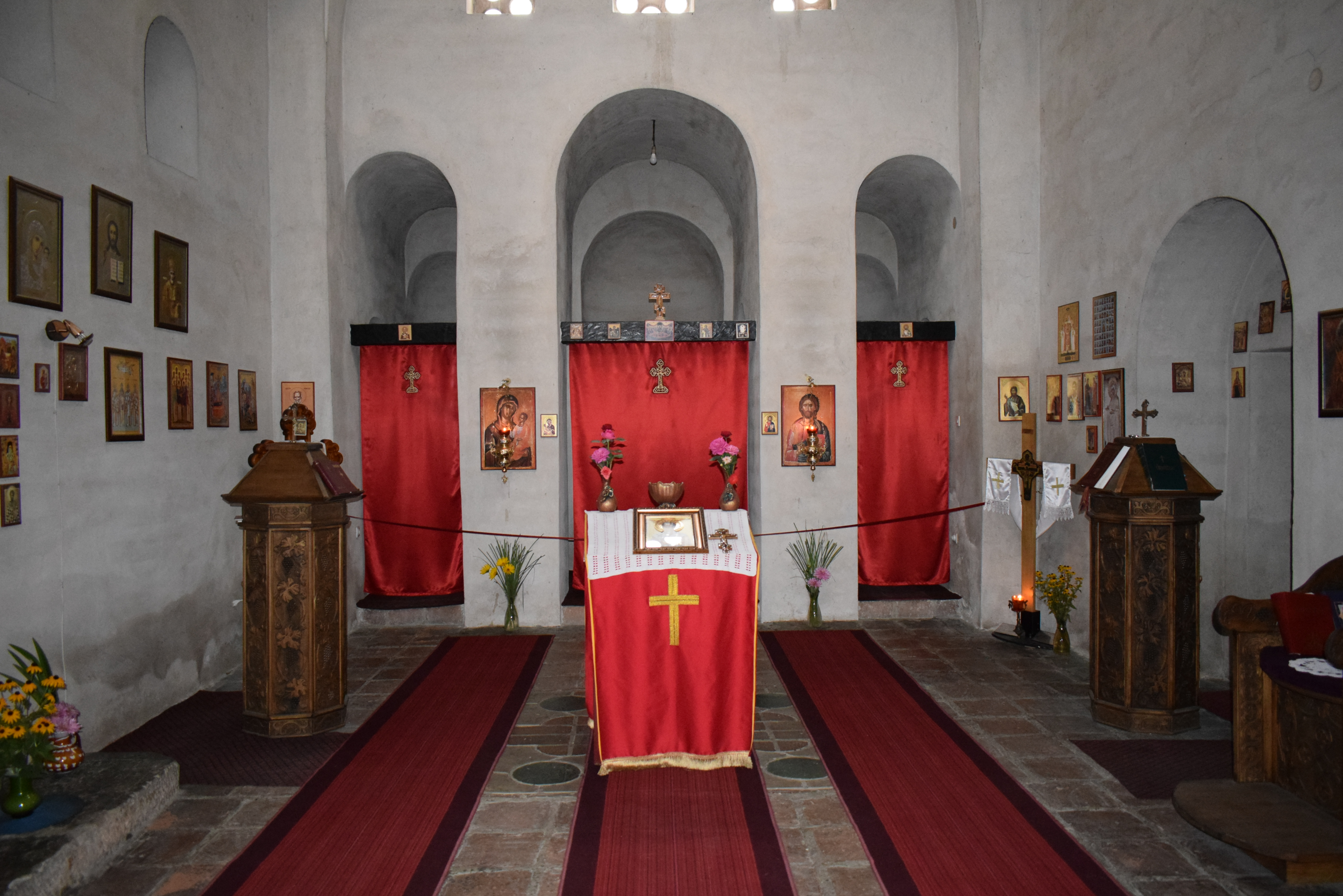

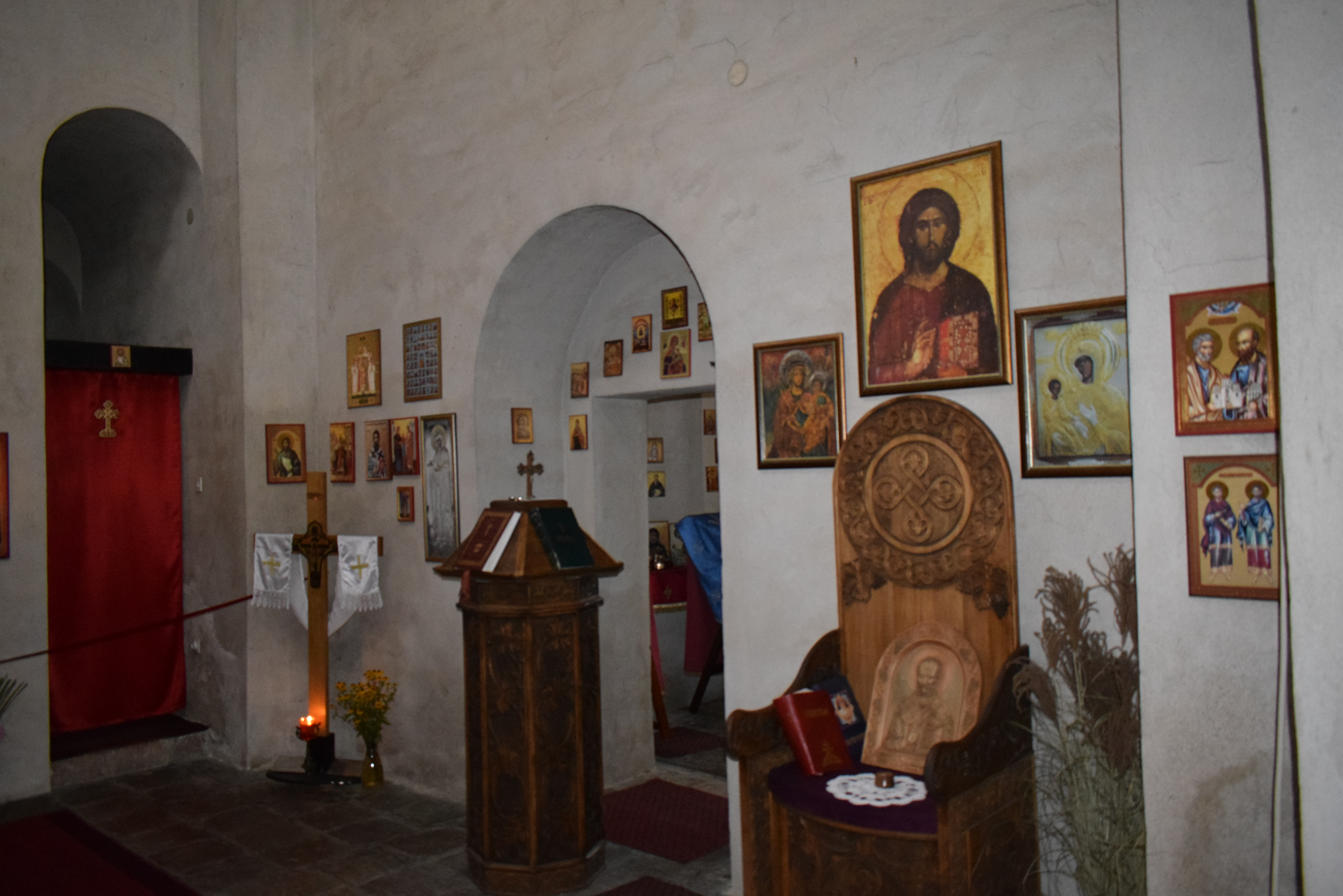

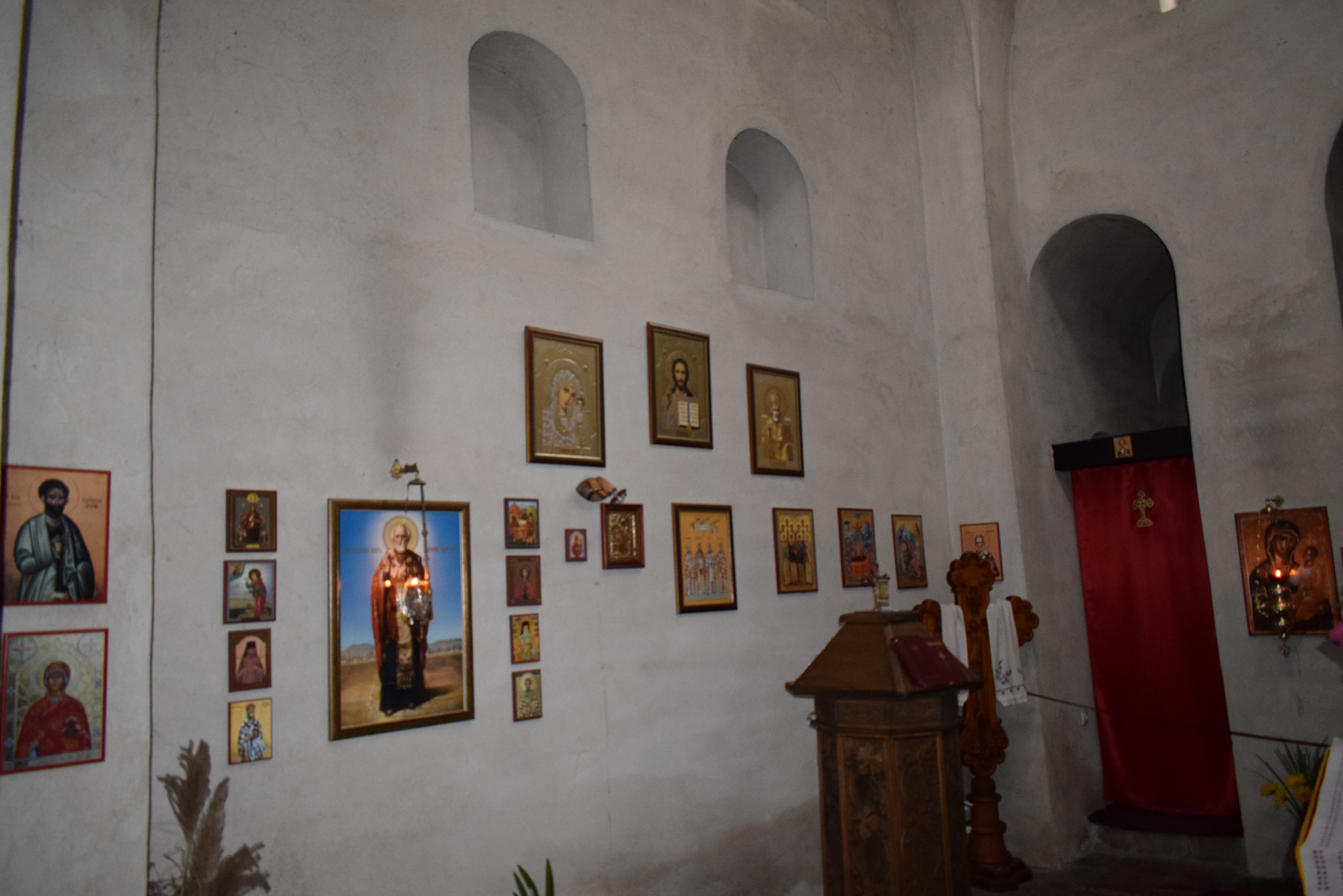

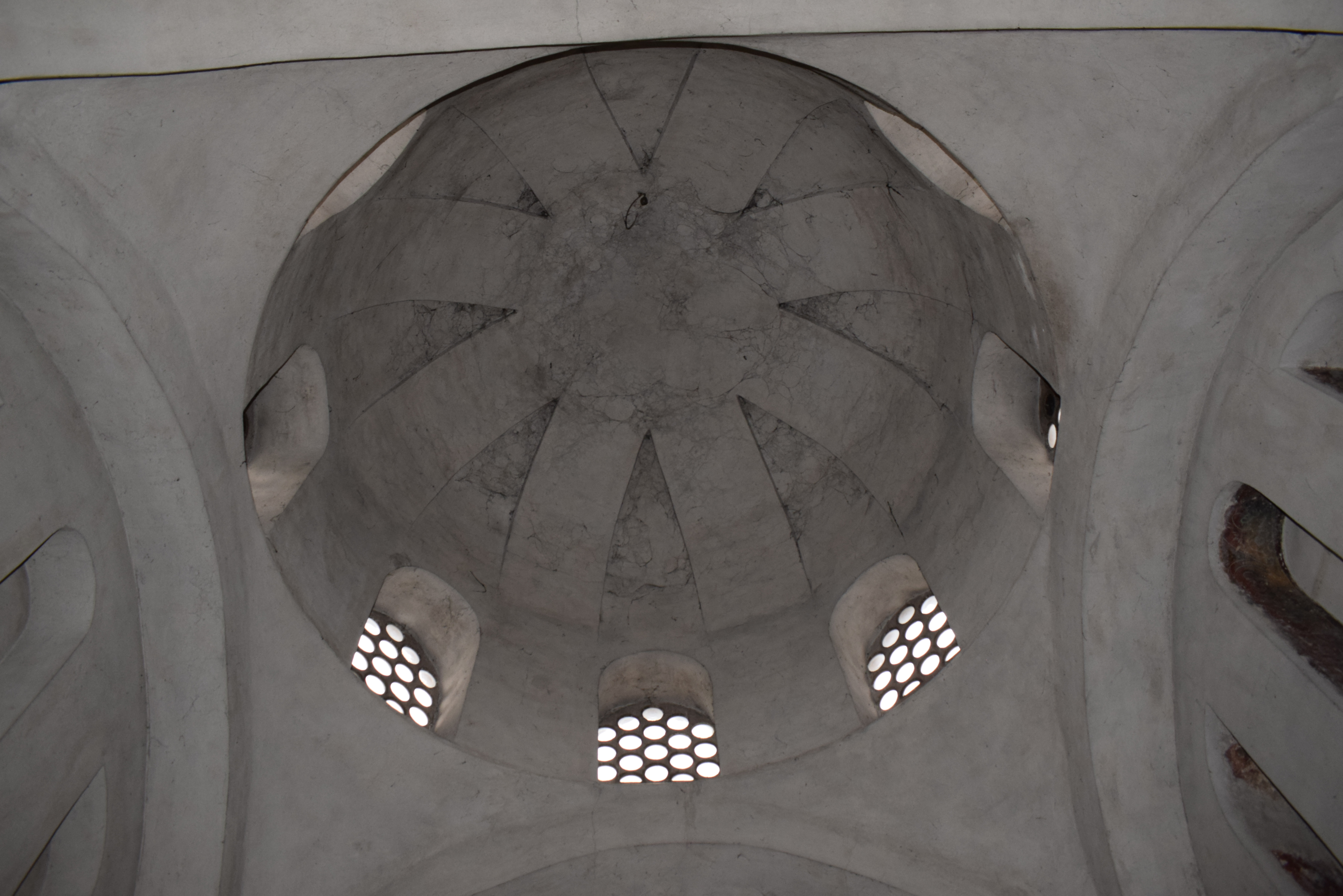

== See also ==
- List of Serbian Orthodox monasteries

== Bibliography ==
- Јанковић, Марија (1985). Епископије и митрополије Српске цркве у средњем веку (Bishoprics and Metropolitanates of Serbian Church in Middle Ages). Београд: Историјски институт САНУ.
- Popović, Svetlana (2002). "The Serbian Episcopal sees in the thirteenth century (Српска епископска седишта у XIII веку)". Старинар (51: 2001): 171–184.
- Ćirković, Sima (2004). The Serbs. Malden: Blackwell Publishing.
