= Family tree of Serbian monarchs =

This article will be a family tree of Serbian monarchs that includes only monarchs and their descendants who are relevant to the succession.

== High Middle Ages ==
Zavida	Vukanović
Tihomir; Grand Prince	Stefan Nemanja; Grand Prince	Nemanjić
Vukan; Grand Prince	Stefan; Grand Prince, King	Lazarević
Dmitar	Stefan Vladislav; King	Stefan Uroš I King	Stefan Radoslav; King	Branković
Vratislav	Stefan Dragutin; King	Stefan Uroš II Milutin; King
Vratko	Elizabeth	Stefan Vladislav II; King	Stefan Uroš III of Dečani; King	Stefan Konstantin; King
Milica; Princess	Lazar; Prince	Stefan Uroš IV Dušan; King, Emperor	Simeon Uroš; Emperor
Stefan; Prince, Despot	Mara	Vuk	Stefan Uroš V Emperor	Jovan Uroš; Emperor
