= Stefan Radoslav =

Stefan Radoslav Стефан Радослав
- King of Serbia
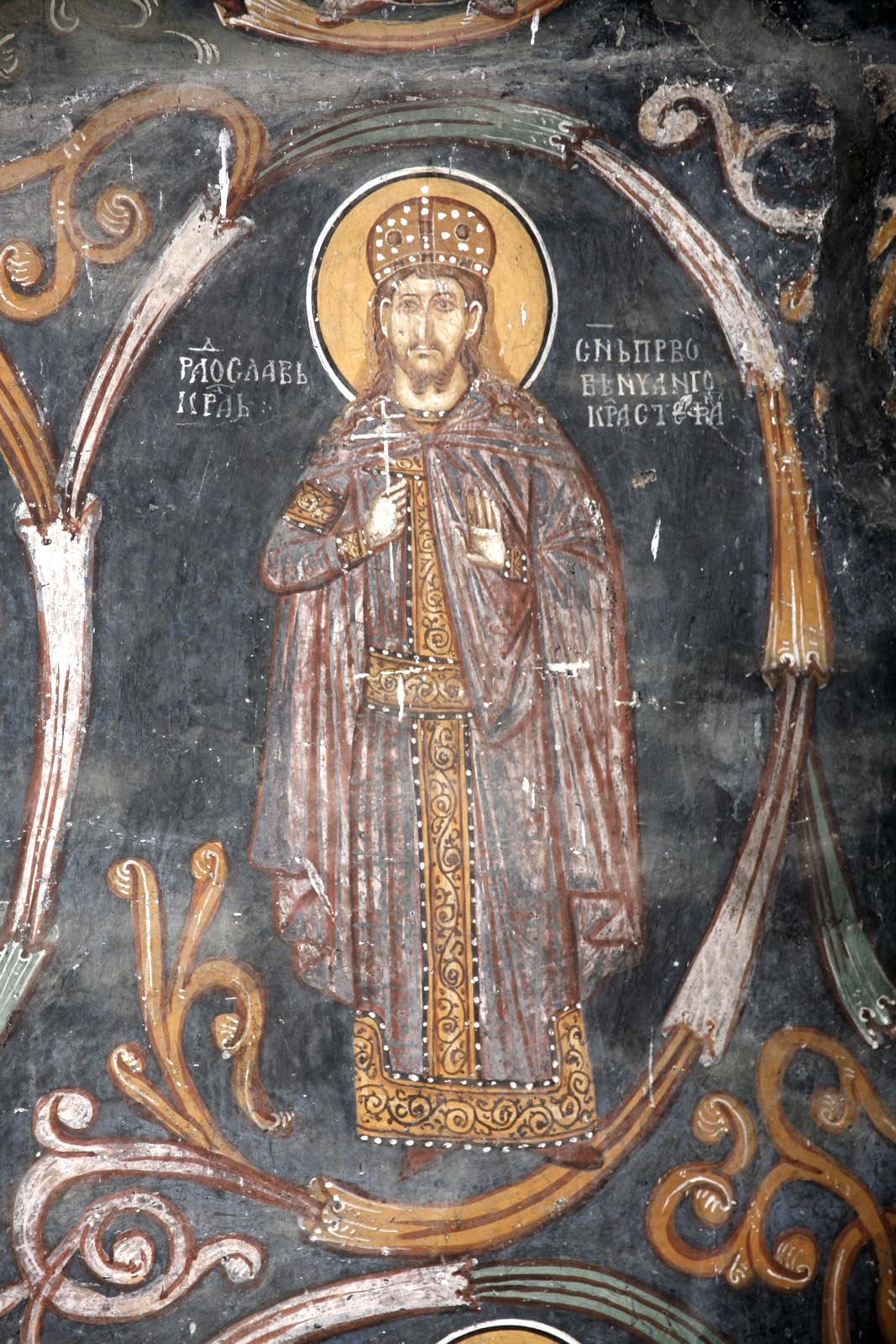
- Fresco from Serbian Orthodox; Studenica Monastery
- Reign: 1228–1234
- Coronation: Žiča
- Predecessor: Stefan Nemanjić
- Successor: Stefan Vladislav
- Born: c. 1192
- Died: after 1235
- Burial: Studenica monastery
- Spouse: Anna Angelina Komnene Doukaina
- Issue: Dragoslav Jovan
- Serbian: Stefan Radoslav
- House: Nemanjić dynasty
- Father: Stefan Nemanjić
- Mother: Eudokia Angelina
- Religion: Serbian Orthodox Christian

Stefan Radoslav (Serbian Cyrillic: Стефан Радослав; c. 1192 – after 1235), also known as Stephanos Doukas (Greek: Στέφανος Δούκας), was the King of Serbia, from 1228 to 1233.

== Family ==
Stefan was the eldest son of Stefan Nemanjić (r. 1196–1228), by his first wife Eudokia Angelina, daughter of Byzantine Emperor Alexios III Angelos (r. 1195–1203) and Euphrosyne Doukaina Kamaterina. He reportedly had two sisters, the first of whom, Komnena Nemanjić, married first Dhimitër Progoni, and secondly the Greco-Albanian lord Gregorios Kamonas, while the second married the sebastokrator Alexander Asen, whom George Acropolites identifies as a son of Tsar Ivan Asen I. It is uncertain if his mother was Maria or Helena, respectively the first and second wife of Ivan Asen I. Alexander was the father of Kaliman II of Bulgaria.

According to the historian John Van Antwerp Fine, Jr., Eudokia was repudiated on grounds of adultery in c. 1200–01. Fine summarizes a passage of Niketas Choniates to state "She left on foot with only the clothes on her back". Eudokia sought refuge with her brother-in-law Vukan Nemanjić, Prince of Zeta. Vukan provided her with hospitality for a while and then arranged for her transportation to Durrës, where she boarded a Byzantine ship heading for Constantinople and returned safely to her father. This indicates Stefan Radoslav was born either in the 1190s or the early 1200s (decade).

Fine considers the treatment of Eudokia to be an indication of a decline in the prestige the Byzantine Empire held at the time. The senior Stefan was evidently unafraid of a military confrontation with his former father-in-law which could have occurred in retaliation for his actions. The alliance with the Empire had apparently outlived its use to the Serbian rulers. Stefan Nemanjić had ongoing border disputes with both Vukan Nemanjić and Emeric of Hungary, though outright war had not started yet. The Byzantines had failed to provide him with any military support and Stefan had apparently despaired of any help arriving from that direction. At the same time the senior Stefan was negotiating submitting himself and his subjects to the Roman Catholic Church in exchange for Pope Innocent III declaring him a King. He had reasons to distance himself from the Byzantines and the Eastern Orthodox Church associated with them.

His father was later remarried to Anna Dandolo, a daughter of Ranier Dandolo and granddaughter of Enrico Dandolo, Doge of Venice. Stefan Radoslav had one paternal half-brother from this marriage, Stefan Uroš I. His mother would proceed to marry secondly to Alexios V Doukas and thirdly to Leo Sgouros, ruler of Nafplion. However, there were no known children by either marriage, thus Radoslav consequently had no maternal half-siblings.

== Ruler of Zachlumia ==
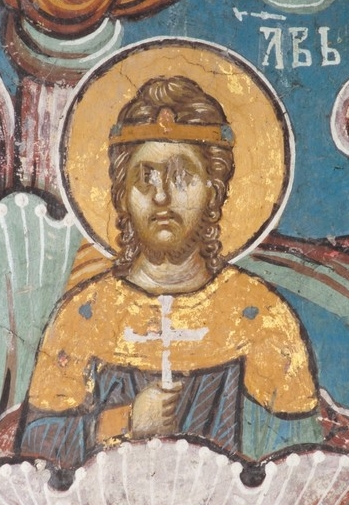
Radoslav, Visoki Dečani

According to "The Realm of the Slavs" (1601) by Mavro Orbin, Stefan Radoslav served as ruler of Zachlumia during the reign of his father. However the sources Orbin used for his history of Zachlumia are not identified by name. They are considered lost and Orbin remains our earliest extant source for several of the events mentioned. According to it Miroslav, the Great was succeeded by his son Andrew (Andrija), only ten-years-old. Missing from the text is Toljen, a son of Miroslav who was mentioned as heir apparent in other sources. With Andrew being underage, the local nobility proceeded to depose him. They offered the crown to Peter (Petar), whose relation to his predecessors is not mentioned by Orbin. Fine notes that later scholars tend to assume Peter was another son of Miroslav and brother or half-brother to Andrew. Some time later, the cause of the exiled Andrew was taken up by Stefan Nemanjić who invated Zachlumia. Peter was forced to retreat to the areas west and north of the river Neretva. The rest of Zachlumia fell into the control of Nemanjić. Fine points that the areas supposedly held by Peter would not be uncontested. They are known from other sources to have been claimed by Andrew, Duke of Croatia and Dalmatia since 1198. Orbin next claims that Nemanjić divided Zachlumia between his cousin Andrew, son of Miroslav and his own son, Radolslav. Andrew was given control of Popovo and coastal Hum. The mainland was granted to Radoslav. Orbin then claims that Radoslav died and Nemanjić granted his area to Andrew. Fine points that Radoslav could not have predeceased his father. We know from other sources that he went on to succeed him. Nemanjić could have simply removed him for his position of authority for reasons lost to us. Orbin continues his account but Radoslav is not mentioned again.

Fine points that the reliability of the above account is at times difficult to determine because the lack of further sources. There are some obvious inaccuracies at times but the basics of the story could be true. A succession crisis in Zachlumia with the existence of rival heirs would be quite plausible. Nemanjić would have reason to get involved. His ongoing rivalry with his brother in the late 1190s would require him to secure control over Zachlumia, in order to prevent Vukan from claiming control for himself. However his activities in the area are otherwise unrecorded. His motivation for backing Andrew against Peter is also unclear. Either of the two could serve as rulers of a puppet state. Installing Radoslav as ruler of eastern Zachlumia would be a way to secure tighter control of the region.

Orbin does not actually provide dates for the events of his account. Fine proceeds to estimate them, based on sources recording other events in the wider region. He estimates the death of Miroslav to 1198. Explaining why Andrew of Croatia and Dalmatia chose that year to attack. He acquired control over areas of Zachlumia northwest of the Neretva. By 1203, this Andrew was involved in conflict with his own brother, Emeric of Hungary. The ongoing conflict would allow Peter to claim the areas northwest of the Neretva for himself. He could have either taken advantage of Andrew's troops already withdrawing or using his own forces to drive them out. Either way, Andrew could probably not afford maintaining two fronts of war at the same time. Securing the area as his powerbase, Peter could then drive his brother from eastern Zachlumia. The amount of time between the time Andrew of Zachlumia went into exile and the decision of Nemanjić to intervene is left unclear in the account by Orbin. Fine suggests it could have been more than a decade. He suggests it could be as late as 1216, just a year before Nemanjić was declared a King by Pope Honorius III. Nemanjić could by then devote his forces to securing eastern Zachlumia for Andrew, his intended puppet ruler. He could then attempt to secure even tighter control by appointing Radoslav in the areas directly bordering Raška. The area could have stayed under his control for longer than Orbin indicates. Fine points that Andrew seems to have "disappeared from the scene" by 1218 when Peter is recorded to have taken over the coastal areas. There seems to be no indication of Peter extending his control to the areas supposedly ruled by Radoslav.

== Reign and deposition ==
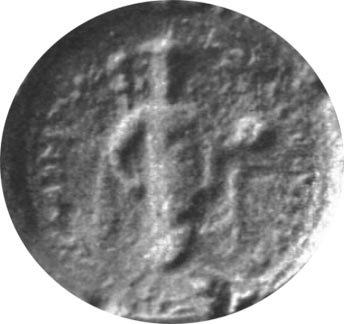
Seal of Stefan Radoslav

Fine mentions Radoslav acting as governor of the Principality of Zeta for part the reign of his father. In a charter variously dated to 1222 or 1228, Radoslav appears as co-founder of the monastery of Žiča with his father. King Stefan the First-Crowned, who had become ill, took monastic vows and died in 1227. Radoslav who was the eldest son succeeded as King, crowned at Žiča by Archbishop Sava, his uncle and the first Archbishop (since 1219) of the autocephalous Serbian Orthodox Church. The younger sons, Vladislav and Uroš I, received appanages. The youngest of the brothers, Sava II, was appointed Bishop of Hum shortly thereafter, later serving as Archbishop of Serbia (1263–1270). The Church and state were thus dominated by the same family and the ties between the two as well as the family's role within the Church continued.

According to biographer and monk Theodosius, Radoslav was a good ruler at first, but then fell under the influence of his wife, who was the daughter of the ruler of Epirus and Thessalonica, Theodore Komnenos Doukas (r. 1215–1230). Radoslav was most likely not beloved by the Serbian nobility due to this Greek influence. Radoslav used his Greek name, Stephanos Doukas, on his coinage, in several Greek documents and even once in his signature.

Radoslav was probably safe from domestic rebellion as long as his father-in-law Theodore remained strong. In 1230, however, Theodore was defeated and captured by Bulgarian Emperor Ivan Asen II, after which Radoslav's position seems to have weakened; some of his nobility revolted in autumn 1233. Serbian medieval biographers noted that the nobility had left the support of Radoslav and stood itself behind the younger Vladislav. Radoslav fled the country between 1 September 1233 and 4 February 1234, and was unable to regain the kingdom, but eventually returned as a monk. Radoslav fled to Dubrovnik (1233) with his wife, and there are indications that Radoslav had organized some actions against Vladislav and that he thought that he would manage to return to the throne - this is evident from a charter dated 4 February 1234, regarding a promise to Ragusan trading privileges once he had returned to Serbia. Because of this, Vladislav began threatening Ragusa, which then had to turn to Bosnian Ban Ninoslav for help, and as the action against Vladislav was unsuccessful, Radoslav found refuge with the Epirote ruler Michael II Komnenos Doukas in Dyrrhachium.

According to Theodosius, Radoslav's wife Anna had left him for a commander of the fortress, a Frank. However, this account has been proven to be false, as there was no Frankish commander in Dyrrachium in Radoslav's time. After some time, Radoslav and his wife returned together to Serbia and took monastic vows.

Vladislav was crowned King upon Radoslav's flight. Vladislav married the daughter of Ivan Asen II, much thanks to Sava. Sava then abdicated in favour of his apprentice Arsenije in the end of 1233. Sava died while heading home from a Holy Land trip, while visiting the Bulgarian court in 1235, and was respectfully buried at the Holy Forty Martyrs Church in Tarnovo. Sava's body was returned to Serbia after a series of requests, and was then buried in the Mileševa monastery, built by Vladislav in 1234. Sava was canonized and his relics were miraculous; his cult remained important throughout the Middle Ages and the Ottoman occupation.

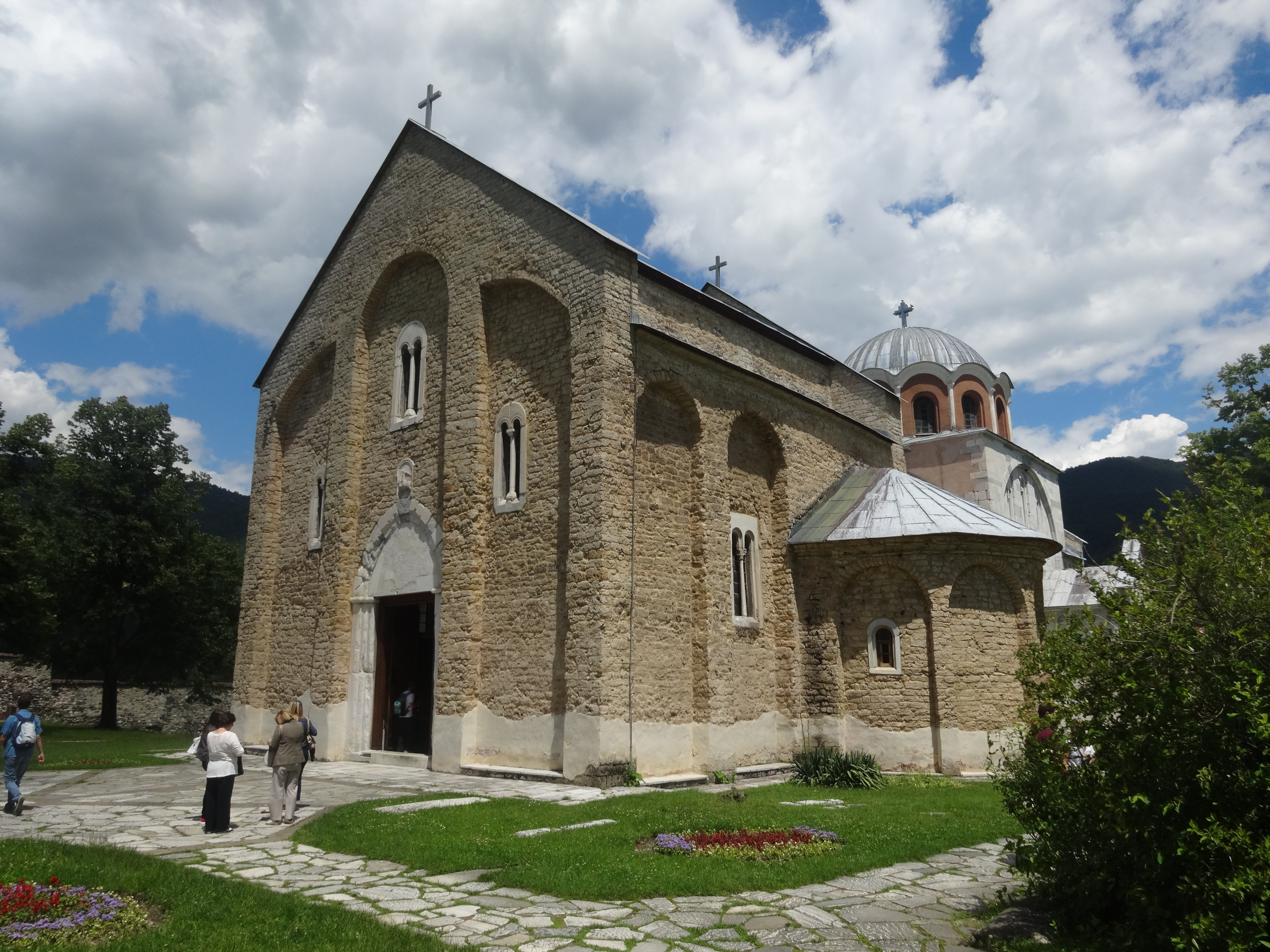
Radoslav added a narthex to the church in the Studenica Monastery

According to Fine both Radoslav and Anna retired into monastic life following their deposition. His monastic name was Jovan. The time and circumstances of his death are unknown. The relations between Vladislav and Radoslav after he had returned and became a monk are not fully known, but he did not disturb his brother. There is a hypothesis that Radoslav even received a part of Serbian land to administrate. In any case, Radoslav continued the rest of his life in peace.

The Europäische Stammtafeln: Stammtafeln zur Geschichte der Europäischen Staaten (1978) by Detlev Schwennicke, reports Radoslav betrothed to Theodora Komnene c. 1217. She was a daughter of Michael I Komnenos Doukas, ruler of Epirus. Both of his wives were members of the Melissenos family. Uncertain which of the two was her mother. Fine indicates Radoslav would instead marry her first cousin Anna Doukaina Angelina in 1219/1220. She was a daughter of Theodore Komnenos Doukas and Maria Petraliphaina. The Europäische Stammtafeln reports the marriage resulting in the birth of a single child.

== See also ==
- List of Serbian monarchs
- Nemanjić family tree

== Sources ==
- Bataković, Dušan T., ed. (2005). Histoire du peuple serbe [History of the Serbian People] (in French). Lausanne: L’Age d’Homme. ISBN 9782825119587.
- Bellinger, Alfred Raymond (1999). Catalogue of the Byzantine coins in the Dumbarton Oaks Collection and in the Whittemore Collection. Vol. 4. Alexius I to Michael VIII, 1081 - 1261 : Pt. 1. Alexius I to Alexius V : (1081 - 1204). Dumbarton Oaks. pp. 635–. ISBN 978-0-88402-233-6.
- Ćirković, Sima (2004). The Serbs. Malden: Blackwell Publishing. ISBN 9781405142915.
- Curta, Florin (2006). Southeastern Europe in the Middle Ages, 500–1250. Cambridge: Cambridge University Press. ISBN 9780521815390.
- Curta, Florin (2019). Eastern Europe in the Middle Ages (500-1300). Leiden and Boston: Brill. ISBN 9789004395190.
- Đekić, Đorđe; Šaptović, Marko (2019). "Kings Vladislav and Radoslav as ktetors: Similarities and differences" (PDF). Kultura (163). Centre for Evaluation in Education and Science (CEON/CEES): 122–136. doi:10.5937/kultura1963122d. ISSN 0023-5164.
- Ducellier, Alain (1999). "Albania, Serbia and Bulgaria". The New Cambridge Medieval History. Vol. 5. Cambridge: Cambridge University Press. pp. 779–795. ISBN 9780521362894.
- Ducellier, Alain (2008). "Balkan Powers: Albania, Serbia and Bulgaria (1200-1300)". The Cambridge History of the Byzantine Empire c. 500–1492. Cambridge: Cambridge University Press. pp. 779–802. ISBN 9780521832311.
- Dvornik, Francis (1962). The Slavs in European History and Civilization. New Brunswick: Rutgers University Press. ISBN 9780813507996.
- Ferjančić, Božidar; Maksimović, Ljubomir (2014). "Sava Nemanjić and Serbia between Epiros and Nicaea". Balcanica (45): 37–54. doi:10.2298/BALC1445037F. hdl:21.15107/rcub_dais_12894.
- Fine, John Van Antwerp Jr. (1994) [1987]. The Late Medieval Balkans: A Critical Survey from the Late Twelfth Century to the Ottoman Conquest. Ann Arbor, Michigan: University of Michigan Press. ISBN 0472082604.
- Ivanović, Miloš (2019). "Serbian Hagiographies on the Warfare and Political Struggles of the Nemanjić Dynasty (from the Twelfth to Fourteenth Century)". Reform and Renewal in Medieval East and Central Europe: Politics, Law and Society. Cluj-Napoca: Romanian Academy, Center for Transylvanian Studies. pp. 103–129.
- Kalić, Jovanka (2017). "The First Coronation Churches of Medieval Serbia". Balcanica (48): 7–18. doi:10.2298/BALC1748007K. hdl:21.15107/rcub_dais_4886.
- Marjanović-Dušanić, Smilja (2006). "Lʹ idéologie monarchique dans les chartes de la dynastie serbe des Némanides (1168-1371): Étude diplomatique". Archiv für Diplomatik: Schriftgeschichte, Siegel- und Wappenkunde. 52: 149–158. doi:10.7788/afd.2006.52.jg.149. S2CID 96483243.
- Mileusnić, Slobodan (1998). Medieval Monasteries of Serbia (4th ed.). Novi Sad: Prometej. ISBN 9788676393701.
- Nicol, Donald M. (1984) [1957]. The Despotate of Epiros 1267–1479: A Contribution to the History of Greece in the Middle Ages (2. expanded ed.). Cambridge University Press. ISBN 9780521261906.
- Obolensky, Dimitri (1974) [1971]. The Byzantine Commonwealth: Eastern Europe, 500-1453. London: Cardinal. ISBN 9780351176449.
- Orbini, Mauro (1601). Il Regno de gli Slavi hoggi corrottamente detti Schiavoni. Pesaro: Apresso Girolamo Concordia.
- Орбин, Мавро (1968). Краљевство Словена. Београд: Српска књижевна задруга.
- Ostrogorsky, George (1956). History of the Byzantine State. Oxford: Basil Blackwell.
- Polemis, Demetrios I. (1968). The Doukai: A Contribution to Byzantine Prosopography. London: The Athlone Press. ISBN 9780485131222.
- Popović, Svetlana (2002). "The Serbian Episcopal Sees in the Thirteenth Century". Старинар (51: 2001): 171–184.
- Samardžić, Radovan; Duškov, Milan, eds. (1993). Serbs in European Civilization. Belgrade: Nova, Serbian Academy of Sciences and Arts, Institute for Balkan Studies. ISBN 9788675830153.
- Sedlar, Jean W. (1994). East Central Europe in the Middle Ages, 1000-1500. Seattle: University of Washington Press. ISBN 9780295800646.

Stefan Radoslav Nemanjić dynasty Born: c. 1192 c. 1234
Regnal titles
Preceded by Stefan the First-Crowned	King of Serbia; 1227/1228–1233/1234	Succeeded by Stefan Vladislav
Royal titles
Preceded by Toljen	Prince of Zahumlje under his father Stefan fl. 1196–1228	Vacant Title next held by Stefan Konstantin
Preceded by Đorđe Nemanjić	Prince of Zeta under his father Stefan fl. 1217–1228	Vacant Title next held by Beloslava as Queen of Zeta
