= Nemanjić family tree =

Following is the family tree of the Nemanjić dynasty, which was a cadet branch of the Vukanović dynasty that ruled Serbia in the Middle Ages.

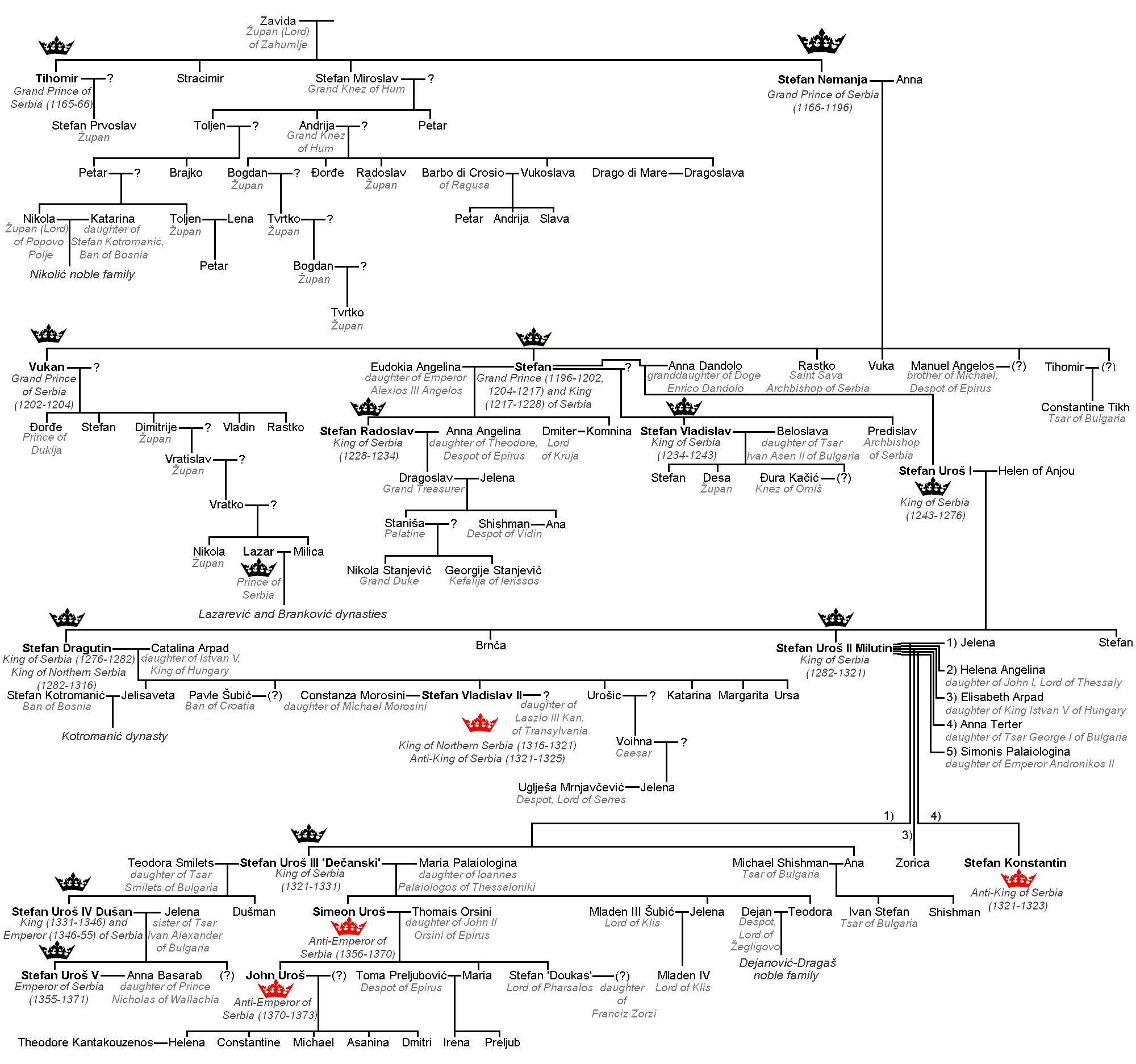
Family tree of the Nemanjić dynasty

== Monarchs ==
Family tree of Nemanjić monarchs

Grand Prince; Stefan Nemanja r. 1166–1196	Anastasia of Serbia
Grand Prince/King; Stefan the First-Crowned r. 1196–1228
King; Stefan Radoslav r. 1228–1234	King; Stefan Vladislav r. 1234–1243	King; Stefan Uroš I r. 1243–1276
King; Stefan Dragutin r. 1276–1282	King; Stefan Uroš II Milutin r. 1282–1321
King; Stefan Uroš III Dečanski r. 1322–1331
King/Emperor; Stefan Uroš IV Dušan r. 1331–1355	Simeon Uroš	Teodora-Evdokija	Dejan
Emperor; Stefan Uroš V r. 1355–1371	Emperor; John Uroš r. 1370–1373	See also: Dejanović noble family

== Full list ==
- Vukan / Uroš I
  - Zavida, Prince of Zachumlia before 1145
    - Tihomir, Grand Prince of Serbia 1163-1166
    - Stracimir, Prince of West Morava 1163-after 1180s
    - Miroslav, Prince of Hum 1163–1190
      - Toljen, Prince of Hum 1192–1196
        - Petar
          - Nikola
            - Vladislav
            - Boriša
          - Toljen II
            - Petar
        - Bajko
      - Andrija, Prince of Hum
        - Bogdan
          - Tvrtko
            - Bogdan
              - Tvrtko
        - Đorđe
        - Radoslav, Prince of Hum 1249-1254
        - Vukosava
          - Andrija
          - Petar
          - Slava
        - Dragoslava
      - Petar, Count of Split 1222–1225
    - Stefan Nemanja, Grand Prince of Serbia 1166-1196
      - Vukan II Nemanjić, Grand Prince of Serbia 1202-1204 and titular King of Duklja 1186-1208
        - Đorđe/Đurađ, titular King of Zeta 1208-1217
        - Stefan, builder of Morača monastery
          - Kostadin
            - Vasoje
              - Stefan
                - Kostadin II
        - Dmitar/Dimitrije, Saint David, clergyman, builder of Davidovica monastery
          - Vratislav, Grand Župan
            - Vratko
              - Nikola
              - Milica, married Prince Lazar Hrebeljanović of Serbia 1371-1389
                - ...see Lazarević dynasty:
                - Mara, married Lord Vuk Branković
                  - ...see Branković dynasty:
                  - Đurađ I Branković, Prince of Serbia
                  - Lazar II Branković, Prince of Serbia
                  - Stefan III Branković, Prince of Serbia
                - Stefan Visoki, Prince
                - Vuk
                - Mara Dragana, married Tsar Ivan Shishman of Bulgaria
                - Teodora, married Nicholas II Garai, Palatine of Hungary
                - Jelena, married firstly Đurađ II Stracimirović Balšić. Lord of Zeta; married secondly Sandalj Hranić-Kosača, Grand Duke of Bosnia
                  - Balša III Balšić
                - Olivera Despina Hatun, married Sultan Bayezid I
        - Vladin (Bladinus)
      - Stefan II Nemanjić the First-Crowned, King of Serbia
        - Stefan Radoslav
        - Komnina
        - Stefan Vladislav I
          - Stefan
          - Desa
          - Unknown Daughter
        - Predislav (Sveti Sava II)
        - Stefan Uroš I, King of Serbia
          - Stefan Dragutin
            - Elizabeth (Married Stjepan I Kotromanić of Bosnia)
              - Stjepan II Kotromanić of Bosnia
                - Elizabeta Kotromanić (Married Louis I, King of Hungary and Poland)
                  - Mary of Hungary
                  - Jadwiga (Hedwig) of Poland
              - Unknown Son
              - Katarina
              - Marija
            - Unknown Daughter
            - Stefan Vladislav II
            - Urošic
          - Stefan Uroš II Milutin, King of Serbia
            - Stefan Uroš III Dečanski, King of Serbia
              - Stefan Uroš IV Dušan, King of Serbia (1331–1346) and Tsar of All Serbs and Greeks (1346–1355)
                - Stefan Uroš V, Tsar
              - Dušman (Dušica)
              - Simeon (Siniša) Uroš
                - Jovan Uroš
                  - Unknown Daughter
                - Marija Angelina Dukaina
                  - Irina
                  - Unknown Son
                - Stefan Duka
              - Jelena (Married Mladen III Šubić)
              - Teodora, married Sebastokrator Dejan Dragaš, member of the Dejanović noble family
            - Ana-Neda (Dominika) (Married Mihail Asen III (Mihail Šišman), Tsar of Bulgaria)
              - Ivan Stefan, Tsar of Bulgaria (1330–1331)
              - Mihail
              - Šišman
            - Carica Zorica, engaged to Charles II, Count of Alençon
            - Konstantin
          - Brnča
          - Stefan
      - Rastko (Sava), the first Serbian Archbishop 1217-1233 and founder of the Serbian Church
      - Unknown Daughter
      - Unknown Daughter
        - Konstantin Tih Asen, Tsar of Bulgaria
          - Mihail Asen II, Tsar of Bulgaria
