= Stefan Vukanović Nemanjić =

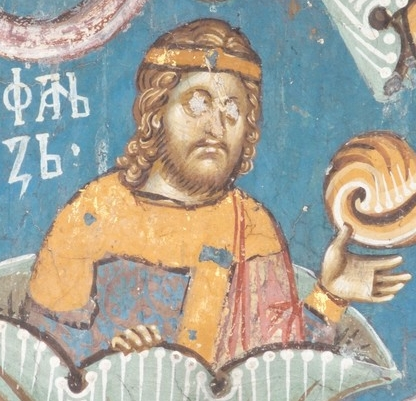
- Fresco of Stefan, at the Visoki Dečani.
- Born: c. 1200
- Died: after 1252
- Burial: Morača monastery
- Dynasty: Nemanjić
- Father: Vukan Nemanjić
- Religion: Roman Catholicism

Stefan Vukanović Nemanjić (Serbian Cyrillic: Стефан Вукановић Немањић, d. after 1252) was prince (Serbian Cyrillic: кнез / knez) of upper Zeta in the medieval Kingdom of Serbia. He was the principal ktetor of the Morača monastery (in modern Montenegro). He was the second son of Serbian Grand Prince Vukan Nemanjić (r. 1202-1204), and also a nephew of Serbian king Stefan the First-Crowned (r. 1196–1202, 1204–1227).

== Life ==
Stefan was the son of Grand Prince Vukan, who was self-styled "King of Duklja, Dalmatia, Travunia, Toplica and Hvosno" (1195), and ruled the entire Serbia briefly in 1202-1204. Stefan Vukanović, titled knez ("prince") had two brothers, the eldest Đorđe, who was the Grand Prince of Zeta (1208–1216), and youngest Dmitar, a župan (county lord) and monk. In 1252, Stefan Vukanović built the Morača monastery.

== Morača monastery ==
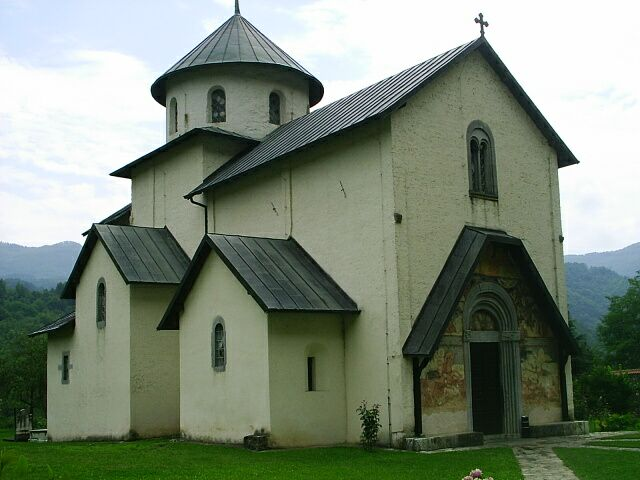
The Morača monastery, Stefan Vukanović's endowment.

Stefan Vukanović built the monastery by the Morača river, in the region of upper Zeta, in modern Montenegro. It was founded in 1251-1252, during the rule of Serbian king Stefan Uroš I (r. 1243–1276), who issued the founding charter. Upon foundation, the monastery of Morača belonged to the Eparchy of Zeta of the Archbishopric of Žiča, and today it belongs to the Metropolitanate of Montenegro and the Littoral of the Serbian Orthodox Church.

Ancestors of Stefan Vukanović Nemanjić

16. Uroš I of Rascia
8. Zavida
17. Anna Diogene
4. Stefan Nemanja
2. Vukan Nemanjić
5. Anastasija
1. Stefan Vukanović
3. Unknown

== See also ==
- Nemanjić family tree
- Pomorje
- Stefan (title)
- Medieval Serbia
- History of Montenegro

== Sources ==
- Aleksić, Vladimir; Milić, Dragana; Živković, Vojislav (2022). "Grand knez Stephen Vukanović and the Morača Monastery". Istraživanja: Journal of historical researches. 33: 24–39.
- Bubalo, Đorđe (2014). Pragmatic Literacy in Medieval Serbia. Turnhout: Brepols.
- Ćirković, Sima (2004). The Serbs. Malden: Blackwell Publishing.
- Fine, John Van Antwerp Jr. (1994) [1987]. The Late Medieval Balkans: A Critical Survey from the Late Twelfth Century to the Ottoman Conquest. Ann Arbor: University of Michigan Press.
