= Đorđe Nemanjić =

Đorđe Nemanjić / George of Zeta
- Grand Prince of Zeta; King of Duklja (self-styled)

Grand Prince of Zeta
- Reign: 1208–1242
- Predecessor: Vukan Nemanjić
- Successor: Stefan Radoslav
- Born: Đorđe Vukanović Nemanjić
- Issue: Dimitrije; Stefan
- Dynasty: Nemanjić
- Father: Vukan Nemanjić
- Religion: Roman Catholicism

Đorđe Nemanjić or George of Zeta (Serbian Cyrillic: Ђорђе Немањић; fl. 1208–1243) was the Grand Prince of Zeta, from at least 1208 until at least 1242. For some time, around 1208, he also was a self-styled King of Duklja. He was the oldest son of Vukan Nemanjić (d. before 1208), the Grand Prince of Serbia (1202–1204) and titular King of Duklja (1190–1208), hence George too was a titular King, for a few years after his father's death. In 1208, he accepted the suzerainty of the Republic of Venice. By 1214-1216, his paternal uncle Stefan Nemanjić, the Grand Prince of Serbia (1196-1202, 1204-1217) imposed his rule on Zeta, but within the newly proclaimed Kingdom of Serbia (1217), Đorđe was left to administer some part of the region, as prince of Duklja (lat. princeps Dioclie), being mentioned as such for the last time in 1242.

== Background ==
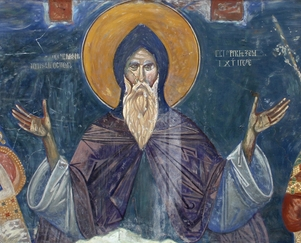
Saint Symeon (Stefan Nemanja), fresco from Bogorodica Ljeviška church in Prizren (1307—1309)

Stefan Nemanja had managed to secure the independence from the Byzantine Empire after the death of emperor Manuel I (1180), and then conquered the traditional fiefs of Duklja, Travunia and Hum on the Adriatic coast. Nemanja gives Vukan, as heir presumptive, appanages of the conquered lands, including Hvosno and Toplica around 1190 as Grand Prince.

Although Vukan was the eldest son of Stefan Nemanja, Nemanja had instead chosen his younger son Stefan [II] as heir. This was done as Nemanja preferred to see Stefan Nemanjić on the Serbian throne as he was married to Eudokia, the daughter of Byzantine Emperor Alexios III Angelos. It seems that Vukan reacted on this change in succession by adopting a royal title; in an inscription dated 1195 in the church of St. Luke in Kotor, Vukan is titled as King of Duklja, Dalmatia, Travunia, Toplica and Hvosno. Although Vukan assumed a royal title, he remained under his father's authority. In 1196, at a State Council, Nemanja abdicated in favour of Stefan; Vukan had to recognize his brother as the new ruler of Serbia. Nemanja took monastic vows and was given the name Simeon, and retreated to Hilandar at Mount Athos. While Nemanja was alive Vukan didn't oppose Stefan's rule but as soon as Nemanja died in 1200 he started to plot against Stefan in order to become Grand Prince. He found aid in Hungarian King Emeric (1196–1204) who at the time fought against the Second Bulgarian Empire and wanted Serbian assistance. With the help of Hungarian troops in 1202, Vukan managed to overthrow Stefan, who fled to Bulgaria, and Vukan was left to rule. In an inscription dating to 1202–1203, Vukan is titled as Grand Župan Vukan, Ruler of all Serbian land, Zeta, maritime towns and land of Nišava.

In return for Hungarian help, Vukan became a Hungarian vassal and promised that he would convert to Catholicism if the Pope would give him royal title. However, as a Hungarian vassal, Vukan soon got involved in the Hungarian conflict with Bulgaria. In 1203 Bulgarians attacked Serbia and conquered the eastern part of country with the city of Niš. In the chaos that followed the Bulgarian attack, and using Vukan's talks with the pope against him, Stefan managed to return to Serbia and overthrow Vukan in 1204, becoming Grand Prince again.

== Life ==
=== Early life and accession ===
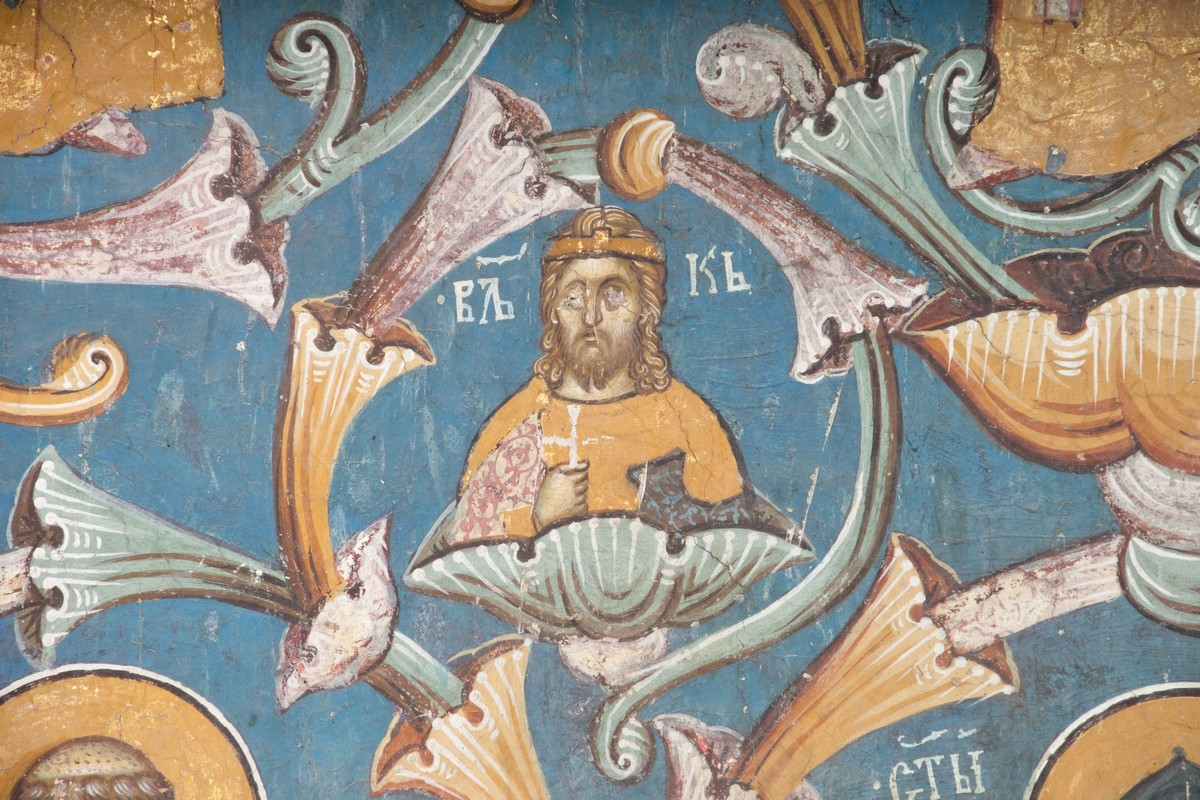
Vukan, George's father. Fresco from Dečani (1346/1347).

George was the eldest son of Vukan Nemanjić. He had three brothers: Stefan, who founded Morača monastery in 1252, Dmitar (better known by his monastic name David) who founded the Davidovica monastery and was still alive in 1286, and Mladen (Bladinus).

After Vukan's coup, Stefan managed to return to Serbia and overthrow him in 1204, regaining the rule of Serbia as Grand Prince. On intervention of the third brother, archbishop Sava, Stefan spared Vukan and returned him his appanage in Zeta. Vukan abdicated for his son George, who is mentioned as "King" in 1208. Vukan is mentioned as "Great Prince" in an inscription in Studenica, dated 1209. Possibly Vukan abdicated in favour for George in his lifetime in order to secure his succession; Stefan might have had taken Zeta during an interregnum. Vukan seems to have died in 1209 or shortly thereafter.

=== Reign ===
The struggle between the two Nemanjić branches continued under George. George accepted the suzerainty of the Republic of Venice, probably in 1208. He could have at least two motives for his entering this arrangement: not only could the Venetian alliance help prevent Stefan from obtaining control of his lands, but it also would Venice from asserting full control over his ports in southern Dalmatia. (After the Fourth Crusade Venice had been working to obtain control over Balkan ports, and had in 1205 established an arrangement with Dubrovnik under which the city was required to support Venice militarily in exchange for retaining its autonomy in other respects.)

George soon also entered a military alliance with Venice against the Albanian Dimitri of the Progon family, who controlled a part of Albania from a mountain stronghold at Kroja (Arbanon). Dimitri was theoretically also a vassal of Venice, but in a treaty signed on 3 July 1208, George promised to provide military support to Venice if Dimitri attacked Venetian territory. The Gëziq inscription mention the Progon family as judices, and notes their dependence to Mladen and George. The alliance against Dimitri may have been related to the struggle between the two Nemanjić branches, as Dimitri had was married to Komnena Nemanjić, a daughter of Stefan. By 1212, the Venetians had left Arbanon, abandoning it to Michael Angelos, in circumstances that remain uncertain. Arbanon remained to its traditional fidelities, Byzantine and Serbian, Orthodox; when Dimitri died, Gregory Kamonas succeeded in ruling Arbanon, and took Komnena as his second wife; ties were strengthened with Serbia, with which ties had been weakened by a Serbian attack on Scutari following the collapse of the Venetian duchy of Durazzo.

There are no historical accounts of George's activities from the time of July 1208 treaty through 1216. By 1216, Stefan had obtained Zeta, probably through military action, and put an end to Zetan independence. Stefan eventually assigned Zeta to his own son Stefan Radoslav, though recently scholars believe that he retained the province for himself. Zeta remained part of Serbia without any special legal position, and it was frequently held by the heir of the Serbian throne, who bore a title not connected to Zeta but his position in the Serbian court.

== See also ==
- Nemanjić family tree

== Sources ==
- Ćirković, Sima (2004). The Serbs. Malden: Blackwell Publishing.
- Ducellier, Alain (1999). "Albania, Serbia and Bulgaria". The New Cambridge Medieval History. Vol. 5. Cambridge: Cambridge University Press. pp. 779–795.
- Fine, John Van Antwerp Jr. (1994) [1987]. The Late Medieval Balkans: A Critical Survey from the Late Twelfth Century to the Ottoman Conquest. Ann Arbor: University of Michigan Press.
- Janićijević, Jovan, ed. (1998). The Cultural Treasury of Serbia. Belgrade: Idea, Vojnoizdavački zavod, Markt system.
- Jireček, Constantin (1911). Geschichte der Serben. Vol. 1. Gotha: Perthes.
- Todić, Branislav; Popović, Danica (2006). Monastery of Morača. Srpska akademija nauka i umetnosti, Balkanološki institut. ISBN 9788671790468.
- Leskovac, Mladen; Forišković, Aleksandar; Popov, Čedomir (2004). Srpski biografski rečnik [Српски биографски речник]. Vol. 2. Novi Sad: Budućnost [Будућност].

Royal titles
Preceded by Vukan	Grand Prince of Zeta; 1208–1216	Succeeded by Stefan Radoslav
