= Sitnica (Morača) =

Location
- Country: Montenegro

Physical characteristics
- Mouth
  - location: Morača
  - coordinates: 42.3876°N 19.1929°E

Basin features
- Progression: Morača→ Lake Skadar→ Bojana→ Adriatic Sea

The Sitnica (Serbian Cyrillic: Ситница, pronounced [sǐtnitsa]) is a river that flows through Podgorica, Montenegro. It is a right tributary of the Morača.
