= Morača =

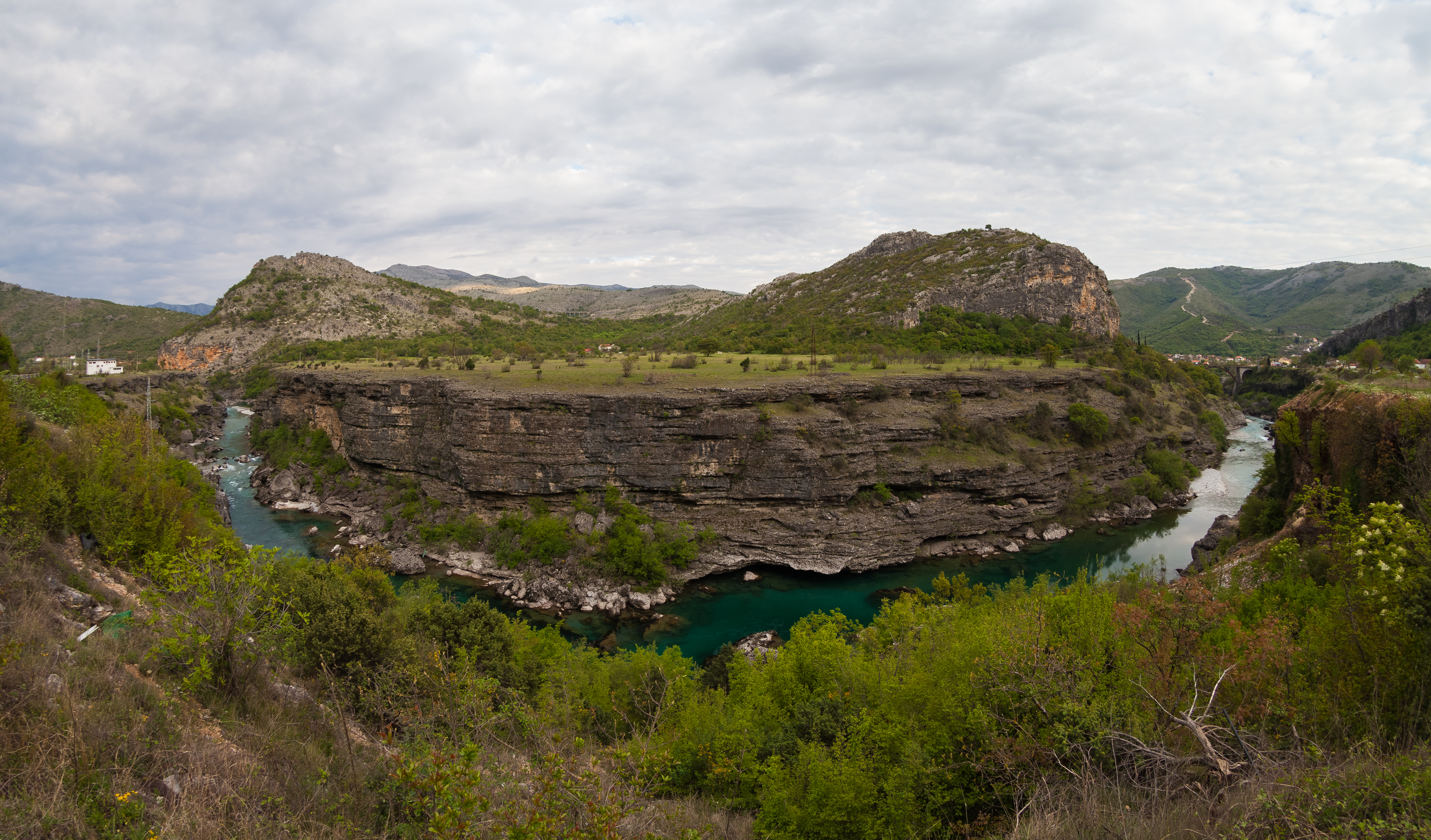
- Morača valley north of Podgorica.

- Location within Montenegro
- Native name: Морача (Montenegrin)

Location
- Country: Montenegro

Physical characteristics
- Source: Rzača mountains
  - coordinates: 42.8654°N 19.2481°E
  - elevation: 1,374 metres (4,508 ft)
- Mouth: Lake Skadar
  - location: Lake Skadar
  - coordinates: 42°16′35″N 19°07′16″E
  - elevation: 1 metre (3 ft 3 in)
- Length: 99.5 km (61.8 mi)
- Basin size: 3,257 km^{2} (1,258 sq mi)

Basin features
- Progression: Lake Skadar→ Bojana→ Adriatic Sea
- Tributaries
  - left: Ribnica, Cijevna
  - right: Zeta, Sitnica

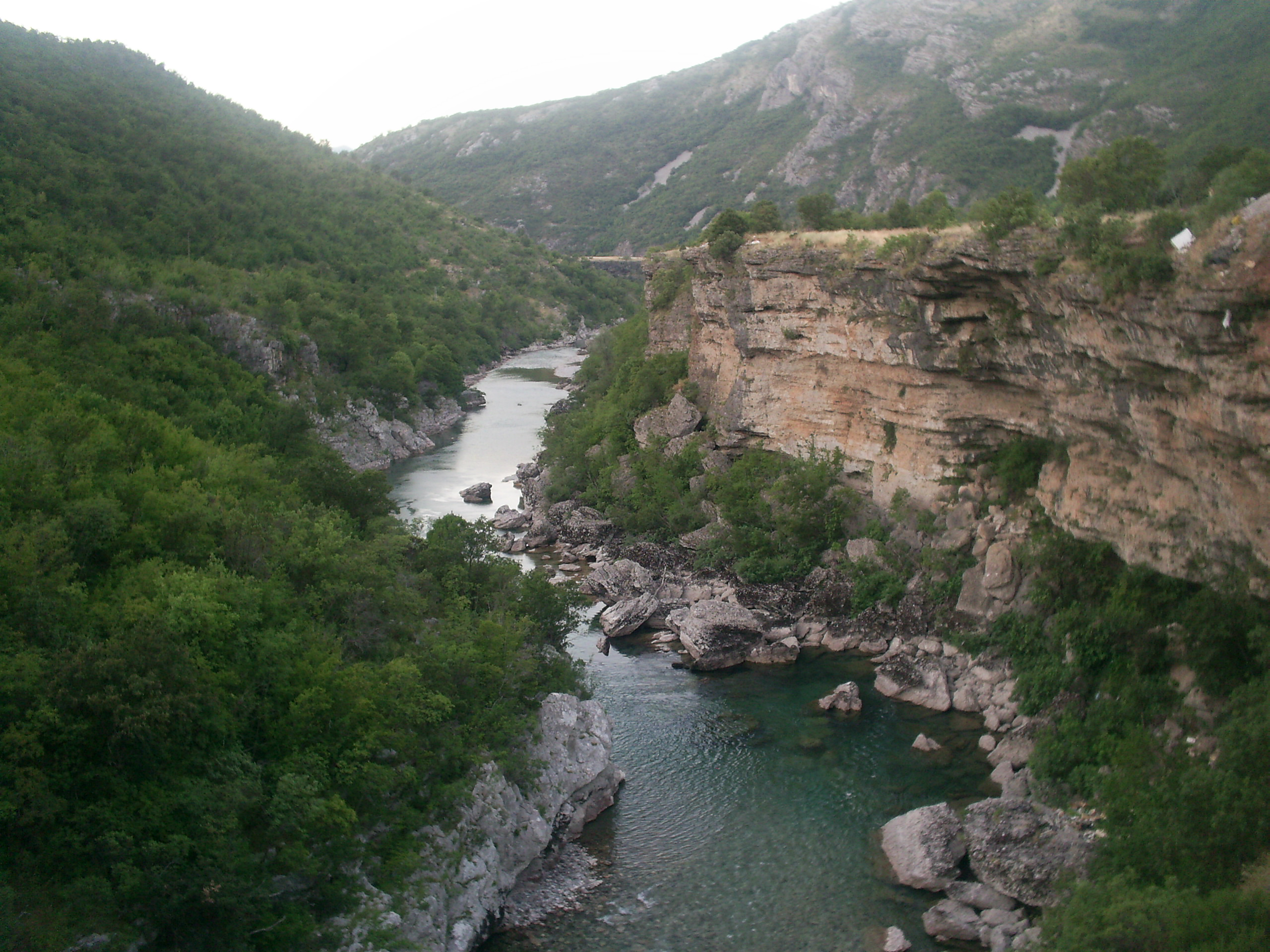
Morača River Canyon.

The Morača (Montenegrin Cyrillic: Морача, pronounced [mǒrat͡ʃa]) is a major river in Montenegro that originates in the northern region in Kolašin Municipality under Mount Rzača. It meanders southwards for 99.5 km (61.8 mi) before emptying into Lake Skadar. Its drainage basin covers 3,257 km^{2} (1,258 sq mi).

In its upper flow the Morača is a fast mountain river. Just north of Podgorica it merges with its largest tributary, the Zeta, which it then cuts a rocky canyon before entering the Zeta plain. It flows through the surrounding flatland until it empties into Lake Skadar on the border with Albania. A shorter, much broader, meandering, approximately sea-level river, the Bojana, flows through the northwest corner of Albania until it drains into the Adriatic Sea at Ada Bojana.

Relative to other rivers of its length, the Morača is weak in volume. It is rarely more than 50 m (160 ft) wide and mostly shallow, so it is generally not navigable. Its canyon is a corridor for the main road leading from the Montenegrin Littoral to Podgorica, and then to northern Montenegro until it reaches Serbia. The road is considered impassable on foot.

It is one of the symbols, attractions and main notable physical geographical features of Podgorica, as it is the city's principal river. The Morača is also featured on some country symbols and flags.

The Morača monastery, which was founded in 1252 by Stefan Vukanović Nemanjić, is located just north of the river's canyon.

== See also ==
- 2013 Montenegro bus crash
- Morača Sports Center
