= Dmitar Nemanjić =

Prince of Serbia

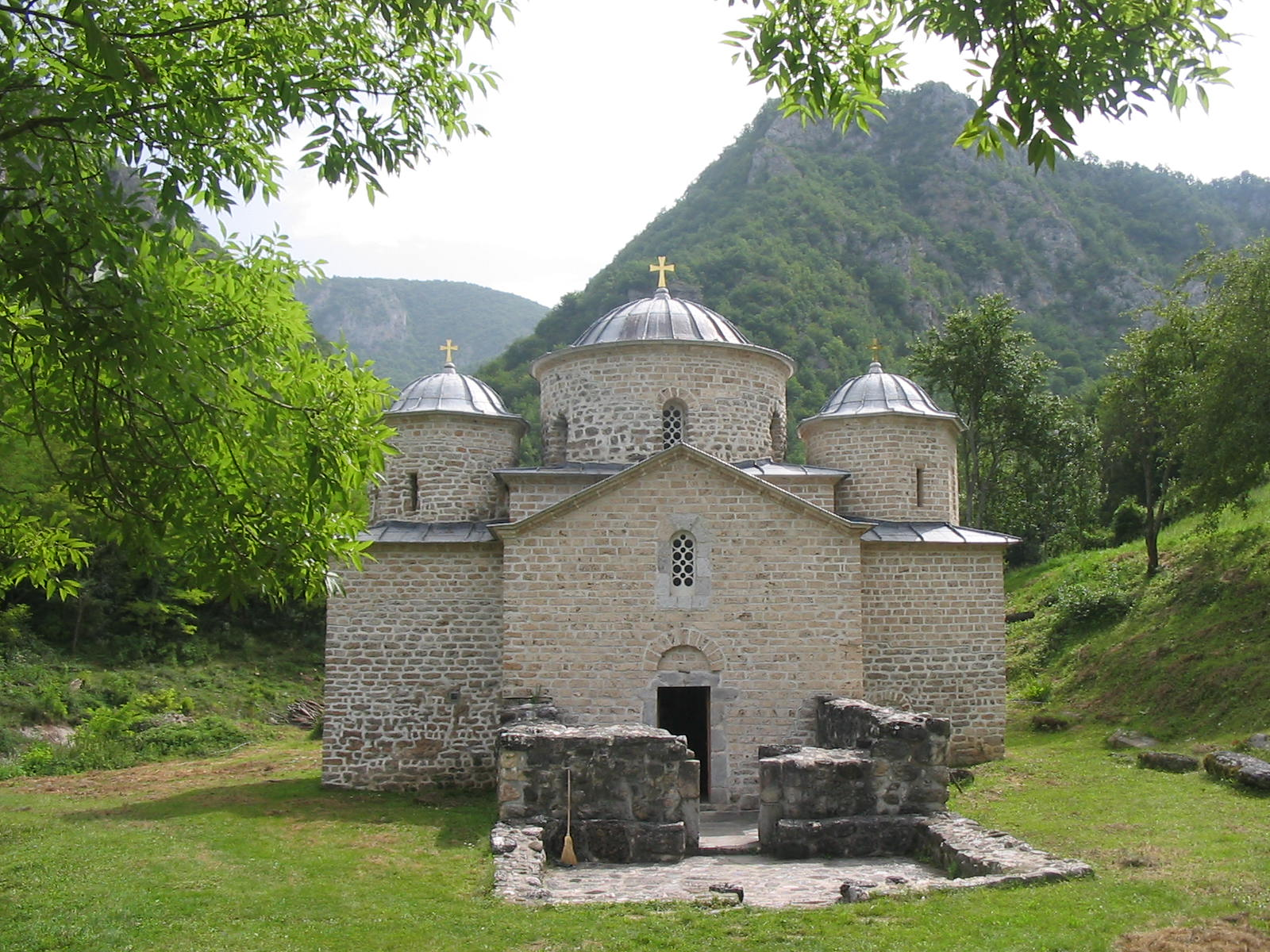
Dimitar's endowment, the Davidovica Monastery, near Brodarevo in Serbia

Dmitar Nemanjić (Serbian Cyrillic: Дмитар Немањић, d. after 1286), also known as Dimitrije Nemanjić (Serbian Cyrillic: Димитрије Немањић), was a Serbian prince, from the Nemanjić dynasty. He was the son of grand prince Vukan Nemanjić and the nephew of king Stefan the First-Crowned. Dmitar was župan (count) in the region of Polimlje, where he built the Davidovica Monastery, near Brodarevo in modern Serbia. In his later days he became a monk, and took the name David. In the Serbian Orthodox Church, he is venerated as Saint David Nemanjić with the title of the Venerable (sr. Prepodobni).

== Life ==
Dmitar was the son of Vukan Nemanjić, the grand prince of Serbia (1202-1204). He had three brothers: Đorđe, Stefan and Mladen (Bladinus). In April 1271, Dmitar asked Emperor Michael VIII to grant the Chilandar a possession of the Struma river. Later he took monastic vows, under the name David. He had the Davidovica Monastery near Brodarevo on the Lim river built by August 1281, with the help of masons of Dubrovnik. He is mentioned in 1286 when he travelled to Jerusalem on a pilgrimage.

He had a son, Vratislav. His grandson Vratko is the father of Milica, Princess of Serbia. He is venerated every September 24 (October 7 on the new calendar) in the Serbian Orthodox Church.

== See also ==
- Nemanjić family tree
- List of Serbian saints

== Sources ==
- Ćirković, Sima (2004). The Serbs. Malden: Blackwell Publishing.
- Janićijević, Jovan, ed. (1998). The Cultural Treasury of Serbia. Belgrade: Idea, Vojnoizdavački zavod, Markt system.
- Kašić, Dušan, ed. (1972). Serbian Orthodox Church: Its past and present. Vol. 3. Belgrade: Serbian Orthodox Church.
- Roberts, Elizabeth (2007). Realm of the Black Mountain: A History of Montenegro. London: Hurst.
- Samardžić, Radovan; Duškov, Milan, eds. (1993). Serbs in European Civilization. Belgrade: Nova, Institute for Balkan Studies.
