= Ljubomir Maksimović =

Serbian Byzantologist (1938–2026)

Ljubomir Maksimović (Serbian Cyrillic: Љубомир Максимовић; 27 November 1938 – 6 November 2026) was a Serbian Byzantologist.

== Life and career ==
Maksimović was born in Skopje on 27 November 1938. He got his BA (1961), MA (1965) and PhD (1971) in history at the Faculty of Philosophy of Belgrade University. At the same faculty he became an assistant in 1961, assistant professor in 1971, associated professor in 1978, professor in 1986 and, finally, the chair of the department for Byzantine history.

From 1978 to 1980 he was the president of the Serbian Association of Historians. From 1994 to 1996 he was the dean of the Faculty of Philosophy, Belgrade. From 1996 he was the vice president of the Association Internationale des Etudes Byzantines. In 1998 he also became director of the Institute for Byzantine Studies of the Serbian Academy of Sciences and Arts.

He worked as a visiting professor in École des Hautes Études en Sciences Sociales (Paris), Max-Planck Institute für europäische Rechtsgeschichte (Frankfurt/Main), Cologne University and University of Crete.

Maksimović won several awards for his achievements, including the City of Belgrade Award (1973), the Scientific Medal of Sofia University (1989), and the Vladimir Ćorović prize for achievements in historiography (2011).

Maksimović died on 6 November 2026, at the age of 87.

== Selected bibliography ==
- Maksimović, Ljubomir (1988). The Byzantine provincial administration under the Palaiologoi. Amsterdam: Hakkert.
- The Historical Atlas of Eastern and Western Christian Monasticism, Liturgical Pr, 2003.
- Град у Визатији: Огледи о друштву позновизантијског доба, Плато, 2003.
- The Byzantine Provincial Administration Under the Paloiologoi, Adolf Hakkert, 1988

== Sources ==
- https://web.archive.org/web/20150210155639/http://www.byzantineinstitute.com/eng/uploaded/biography/Lj._Maksimovic_Biografija_En.pdf (broken link)
- http://www.sanu.ac.rs/Clanstvo/Clan.aspx?arg=1052
