= Vukan Nemanjić =

Grand Prince of Serbia from 1202 to 1204

Vukan Nemanjić Вукан Немањић
- Grand Župan Vukan, Ruler of all Serbian land, Zeta, maritime towns and land of Nišava King of Duklja, Dalmatia, Travunia, Toplica and Hvosno (1195)
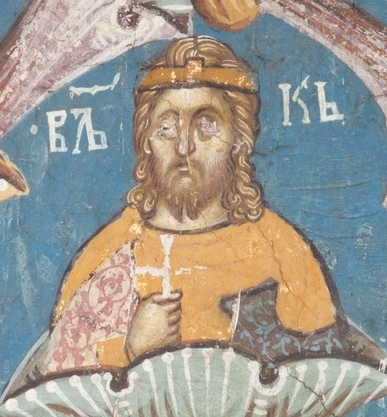
- The fresco of Vukan, Visoki Dečani Monastery

Grand Prince of Serbia
- Reign: 1202–1204
- Predecessor: Stefan the First-Crowned
- Successor: Stefan the First-Crowned

Ruler of Duklja
- Reign: 1190 – after 1207
- Predecessor: Mihailo III
- Successor: Đorđe Nemanjić
- Born: before 1165
- Died: after 1207
- Burial: Morača Monastery
- Issue: Đorđe, Stefan, Dmitar, Vladin; Rastko; Kostadin
- Dynasty: Nemanjić
- Father: Stefan Nemanja
- Mother: Anastasija
- Religion: Roman Catholic

Vukan Nemanjić (Serbian Cyrillic: Вукан Немањић, pronounced [ʋǔkan ně̞maɲit͡ɕ]; before 1165 – after 1207) was the Grand Prince of Serbia from 1202 to 1204. He was the eldest (of three) sons of the Serbian grand prince Stefan Nemanja, who appointed Vukan as governor in Pomorje c. 1190. As the Grand Prince of Pomorje, centered in Zeta, and titular King of Duklja and Dalmatia), Vukan ruled from c. 1195 until his death. In 1196, his father abdicated the Serbian throne, choosing Vukan's younger brother Stefan as the principal heir, while leaving Vukan to rule in Pomorje. In 1202, Vukan overthrew his brother, in a coup assisted by the King of Hungary. He was defeated two years later, when Stefan regained the throne. Through the effort of their third brother, who became Saint Sava, Vukan and Stefan were reconciled, and Vukan continued to rule in Zeta until his death.

== Life ==
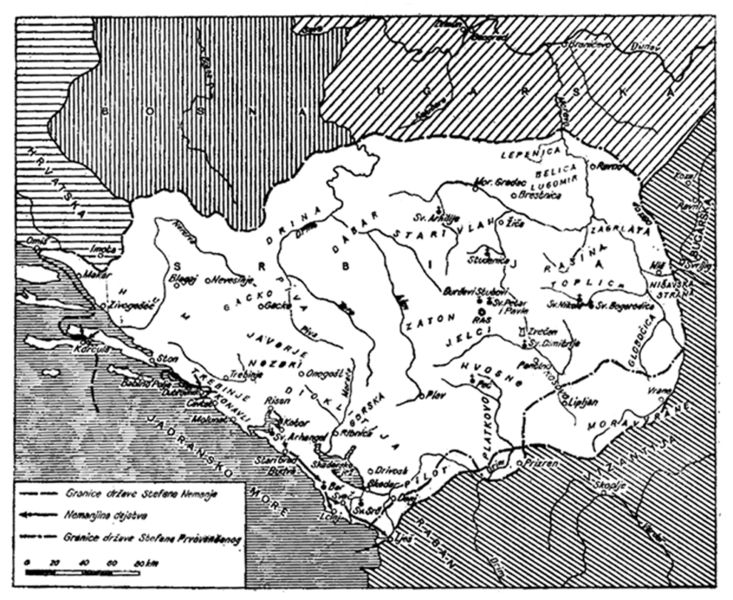
Nemanjić Serbia, 1166–1217.

Vukan was born as the eldest son of Serbian Grand Prince Stefan Nemanja (r. 1166–1196) and his wife Anastasija. His younger brothers were Stefan Nemanjić and Rastko Nemanjić, and he also had two sisters.

His father had managed to secure the independence from the Byzantine Empire after the death of emperor Manuel I (1180), and then conquered the traditional fiefs of Duklja, Travunija and Hum on the Adriatic coast. Nemanja gave Vukan, as heir apparent, appanages of the conquered lands, including Hvosno and Toplica around 1190 as grand prince.

In an inscription dated 1195 in the church of St. Luke in Kotor, Vukan is titled as King of Duklja, Dalmatia, Travunia, Toplica and Hvosno.

Although Vukan was Nemanja's eldest son, Nemanja preferred to see his younger son Stefan Nemanjić on the Serbian throne mostly because Stefan was married to Byzantine princess Eudokia Angelina, daughter of latter emperor Alexios III Angelos. It seems that Vukan reacted on this change in succession by declaring himself King of Duklja in 1195 probably due to the relationship of his family with old Dukljan royal house which was deposed by his father. Although he assumed royal title, Vukan remained to recognize Nemanja's authority. In 1196 at the State Council Nemanja abdicated in favor of Stefan and Vukan had to recognize his brother as the new ruler of Serbia. After the council Nemanja became monk Simeon and retreated to his monastery of Hilandar on holy Mount Athos. While Nemanja was alive Vukan didn't oppose Stefan's rule but as soon as Nemanja died in 1200 he started to plot against him in order to become Grand župan. He found help in Hungarian king Emeric (1196–1204) who at the time fought against the Second Bulgarian Empire and wanted Serbian assistance. With the help of Hungarian troops in 1202, Vukan managed to overthrow Stefan, who fled to Bulgaria, and Vukan was left to rule. In an inscription dating to 1202–1203, Vukan is titled as Grand Župan Vukan, Ruler of all Serbian land, Zeta, maritime towns and land of Nišava.

In return for Hungarian help, Vukan became a Hungarian vassal and promised that he would convert his people to Catholicism if the Pope would give him royal title. However, as a Hungarian vassal, Vukan soon got involved in their conflict with Bulgaria. In 1203 Bulgarians attacked Serbia and conquered the eastern part of country with the city of Niš. In the chaos that followed the Bulgarian attack, and using the Vukans's sympathies for Catholicism against him, Stefan managed to return to Serbia and overthrow Vukan in 1204 becoming grand župan again. On intervention of the third brother, archbishop Sava, Stefan spared Vukan and return him to his apanage in Zeta (Duklja) where he kept his title of king. He was mentioned for the last time in 1207. It is believed that he died soon after because his son Đorđe is mentioned as king in 1208. Until the end of his life, Vukan Nemanjić remained a Catholic.

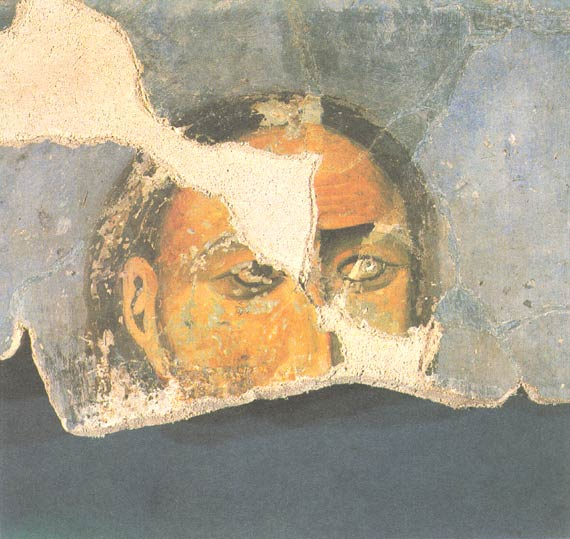
Vukan's fresco, Studenica Monastery.

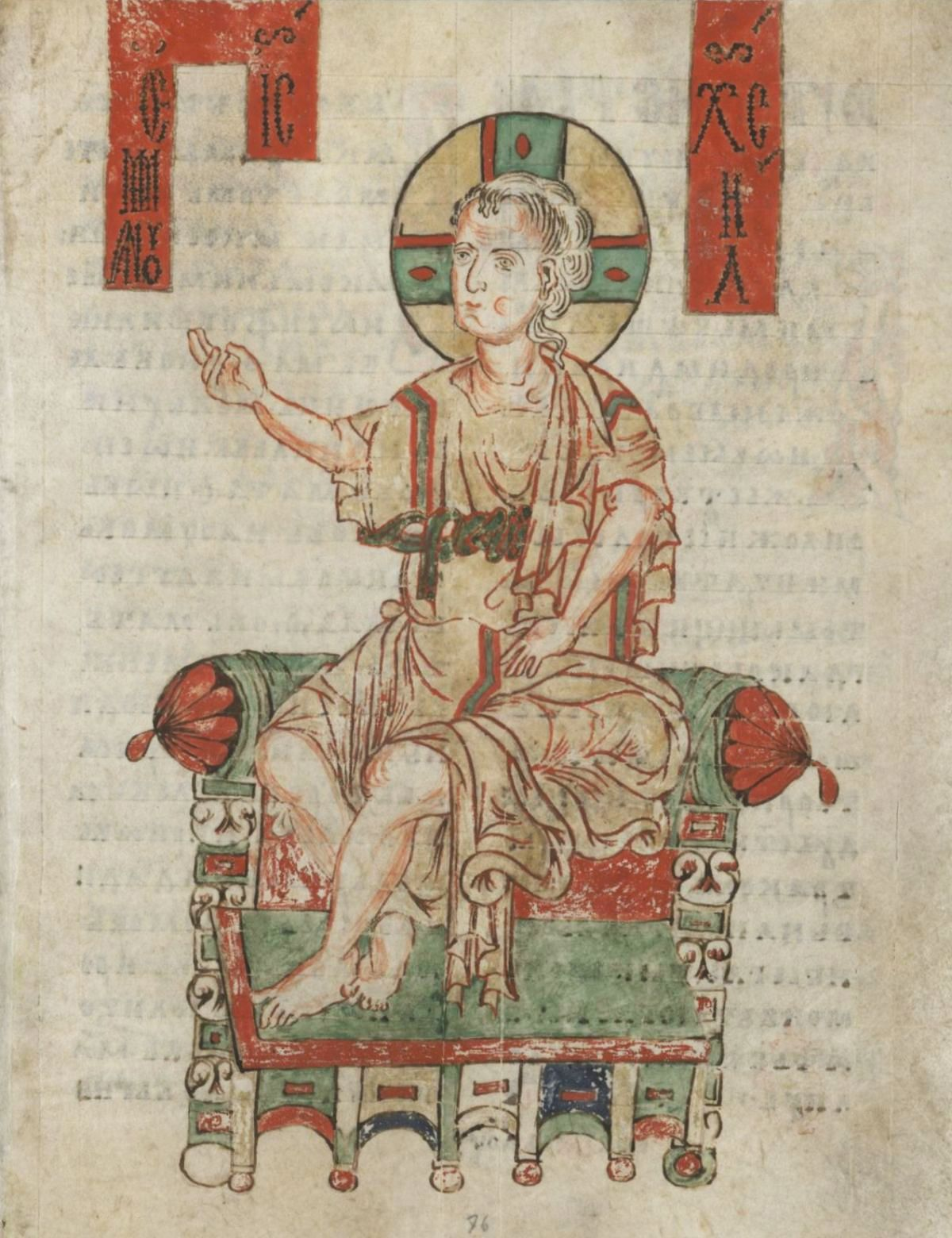
Miniature from the Vukan's Gospel by Monk Simeon.

== Titles ==
- "Grand Župan Vukan, Ruler of all Serbian lands, Zeta, maritime towns and land of Nišava"
- "Vukan, King of Duklja, Dalmatia, Travunia, Toplica and Hvosno" (Velcani, regis Dioclie, Dalmatie, Tribunie, Toplize et Cosme or Velcani, regis Dioclitiae, Dalmatiae, Travuniae, Toplize et Cosne), 1195
- "Crowned king and autocrat of all Serbian and coastal lands".

== Family ==
Vukan had at least three sons by his wife, whose name is unknown; it has been suggested that she belonged to the family of the Counts of Segni and was a relative of Pope Innocent III, a supposition arising from a letter addressed to the pope in which Vukan himself proudly emphasized that he was related to him, although no contemporary source explicitly confirms how exactly they were related.

1. Đorđe who held title of king in 1208, but was only prince in 1242.
2. Stefan who founded Morača monastery in 1252.
3. Dmitar (better known by his monastic name David) who founded monastery of Davidovica and was still alive in 1286. He was great-grandfather of Milica, Princess of Serbia.
4. Mladen (Bladinus).

== See also ==
- Nemanjić family tree

== Annotations ==
1. Name: Archaic Serbian: Вл'кан, В'лк, Latin: Vulcus, Vulchus, Velcan, Velcanus, Wulcanus, Greek: Βολκοσ. He was a descendant of Nemanjić, his father was Stefan, hence, according to the naming culture, his name was Vukan Stefanović Nemanjić.
2. He is given Duklja, Travunija, Hum, Hvosno and Toplica by 1190. In 1195 he is self-styled as "King of Duklja, Dalmatia, Travunia, Toplica and Hvosno". Pomorje is a geohistorical term denoting the territories except Toplica and Hvosno.

== Sources ==
- Aleksić, Vladimir; Milić, Dragana; Živković, Vojislav (2022). "Grand knez Stephen Vukanović and the Morača Monastery". Istraživanja: Journal of historical researches. 33: 24–39.
- Ćirković, Sima (2004). The Serbs. Malden: Blackwell Publishing.
- Curta, Florin (2006). Southeastern Europe in the Middle Ages, 500–1250. Cambridge: Cambridge University Press.
- Curta, Florin (2019). Eastern Europe in the Middle Ages (500-1300). Leiden and Boston: Brill.
- Fine, John Van Antwerp Jr. (1994) [1987]. The Late Medieval Balkans: A Critical Survey from the Late Twelfth Century to the Ottoman Conquest. Ann Arbor: University of Michigan Press.
- Jireček, Constantin (1911). Geschichte der Serben. Vol. 1. Gotha: Perthes.

Vukan Nemanjić Nemanjić dynasty Born: 1170s Died: after 1207
Preceded by Stefan Nemanjić	Grand Prince of Serbia; 1202 - 1204	Succeeded by Stefan Nemanjić
Preceded by Mihailo III as Prince of Duklja	Grand Prince of Pomorje, Toplica and Hvosno; 1190 - after 1207	Succeeded by Đorđe Nemanjić as Prince of Duklja
Preceded by Miroslav as Grand Prince of Hum	Grand Prince of Pomorje, Toplica and Hvosno; 1190 - after 1207	Succeeded by Đorđe Nemanjić as Prince of Duklja
