= Morača (monastery) =

Serbian Orthodox monastery near Kolašin, Montenegro

Morača Monastery
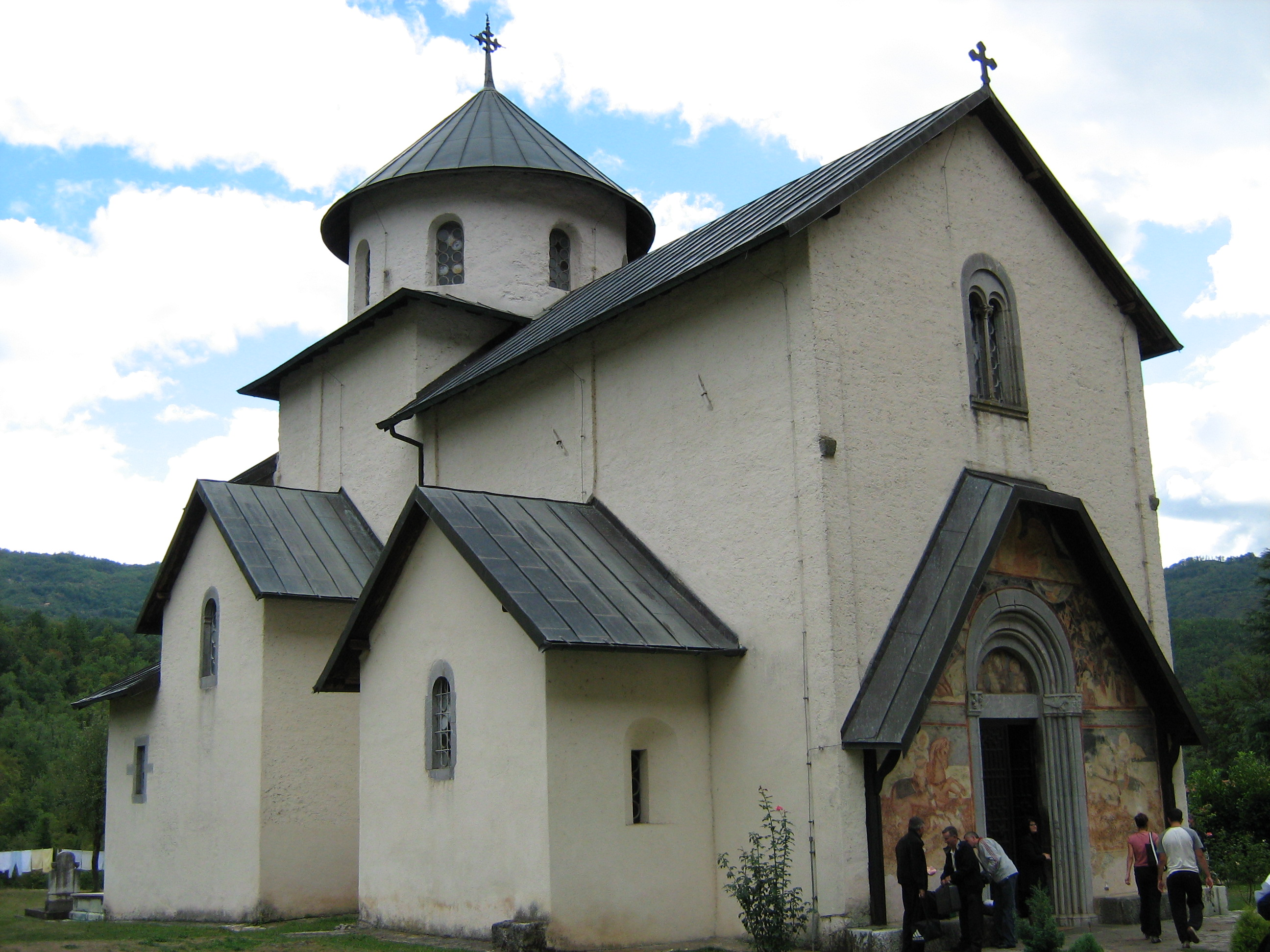

- Location within Montenegro

Religion
- Affiliation: Serbian Orthodox Church
- Ecclesiastical or organisational status: Metropolitanate of Montenegro and the Littoral

Location
- Location: Kolašin; In the valley of the Morača river, central Montenegro
- Coordinates: 42.7661°N 19.3906°E

Architecture
- Architect: Stefan Vukanović Nemanjić
- Type: Byzantine (Ecclesiastical)
- Style: Rascian style
- Completed: 1252

The Morača Monastery (Serbian: Манастир Морача, romanized: Manastir Morača) is a Serbian Orthodox monastery located in the valley of the Morača River in Kolašin, central Montenegro. It was founded in 1252 by Stefan Vukanović, of the Serbian Nemanjić dynasty. It is one of the best known medieval monuments of Montenegro.

== History ==
The founding history is engraved above the western portal. Stefan Vukanović, the son of the Zetan Grand Prince Vukan Nemanjić (r. 1190-1207), founded the monastery in 1252, possibly on his own lands (appanage). The region was under the rule of the Nemanjić dynasty and the founder himself was grandson of Stefan Nemanja, father of the Serbian statehood.

The monastery was burnt down by the Ottomans for the first time in 1505, during a turbulent period of insurgency in Montenegro. The monks took shelter in Vasojevići. It was abandoned for the next seventy years. Thanks to a moderate political climate established by Sokollu Mehmed Pasha rebuilding started in 1574 and ended in 1580. Reconstruction itself was led by monks Tomo and Mojsije, and financially supported by the local population, especially knez Vukić Vučetić. Vuk Stefanović Karadžić, great reformer of the Serbian language and collector of Serbian epic poems, recorded two poems regarding the Sack of Kolašin, in which in the beginning Novica Cerović and Serdar Milan drink wine together besides the white church in Morača.

In July 1944, during World War II, a third session of the Yugoslav land assembly was held at the monastery, in which Montenegrin communists demanded that "the separate mention of the Bay of Kotor be excluded" (resulting in its incorporation into PR Montenegro).

== Architecture ==
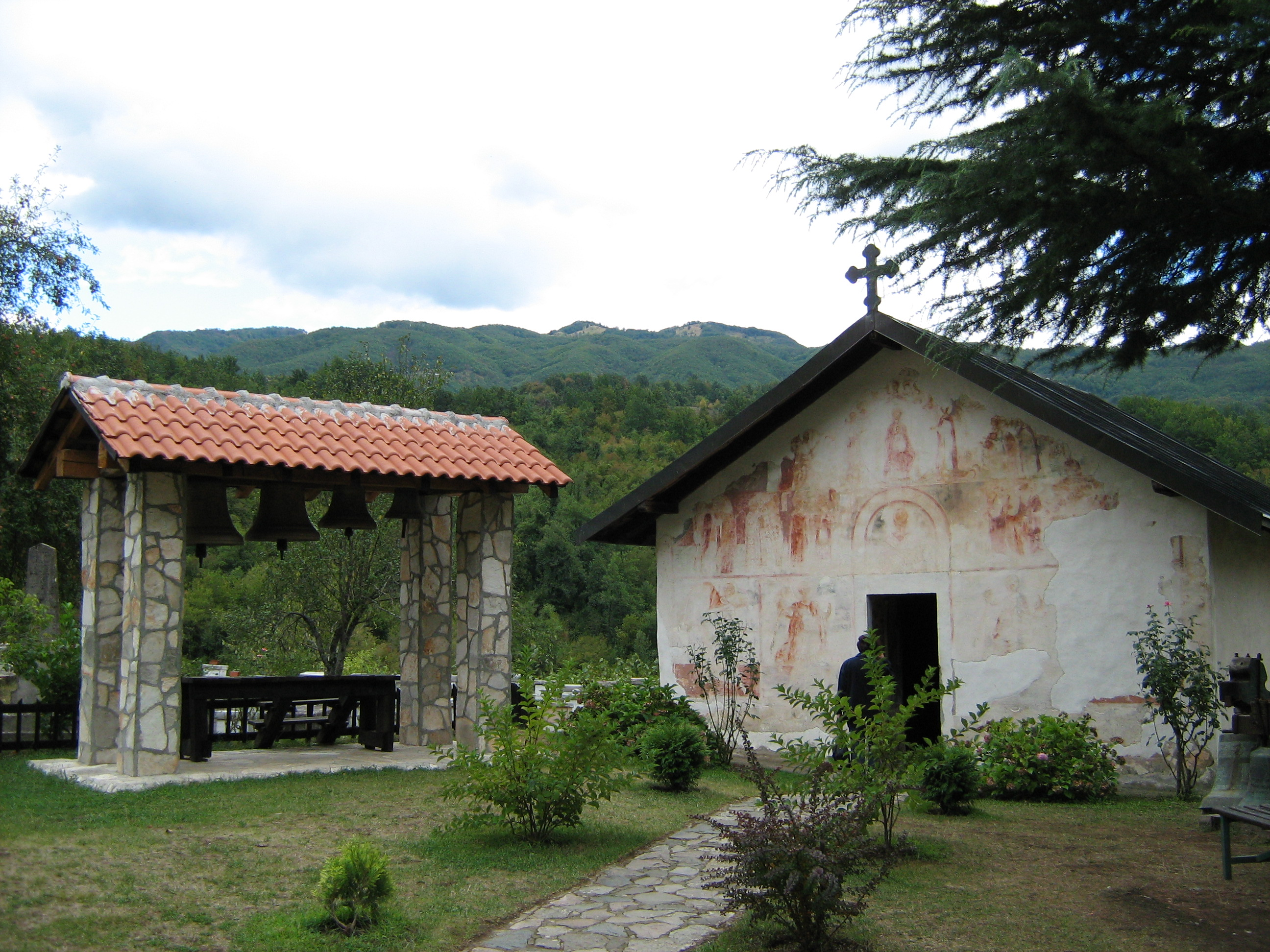
Bell and Church of St. Nicholas.

The main sanctuary (katholikon) is a big one-nave church built in the Rascian style, which developed from 1170 as first of three major artistic and architectural schools of medieval Serbia (also visible in Studenica, Mileševa, Sopoćani, Arilje and, as regards Montenegro, in Berane and Bijelo Polje).

The two main portals are in Romanesque style. The church is devoted to the Assumption of Mary, while a minor chapel is devoted to Saint Nicholas.

Besides architecture, frescoes are also of special importance. The oldest are eleven compositions representing the life of prophet Elias and date back to the 13th century. They show conservative traits, with late-Comnenian figure schemes and architectural motifs of heavy and solid blocks, similar in manner to the frescoes of Sopoćani (Serbia). The others are less preserved and date back to the 16th century. Among them it is worth mentioning two notable Last Judgement depictions, a Paradise and the Bosom of Abraham and Satan on the Two-Headed Beast, both dated 1577-8.

During the Ottoman annexation of the region in the first half of the 16th century, part of the original fresco cycle was damaged or lost.

== See also ==
- List of Serbian monasteries

== Sources ==
- Aleksić, Vladimir; Milić, Dragana; Živković, Vojislav (2022). "Grand knez Stephen Vukanović and the Morača Monastery". Istraživanja: Journal of historical researches. 33: 24–39.
- Fine, John Van Antwerp (1994), The Late Medieval Balkans: A Critical Survey from the Late Twelfth Century to the Ottoman Conquest, University of Michigan Press, ISBN 978-0-472-08260-5
- Mitchell, Laurence (2010). Serbia. Buckinghamshire, England: Bradt. ISBN 978-1-84162-326-9.
