= Zeta (crown land) =

Region in southeastern Europe

Zeta (Serbian Cyrillic: Зета) as a crown land was a medieval region and province of the Serbian state (Principality, Kingdom, and Empire) of the Nemanjić dynasty, from the end of the 12th century, up to the middle of the 14th century (1186–1371). During that period, regional administration in Zeta was often bestowed to various members of the ruling dynasty, who administered the region as a crown land.

== Name ==
At the time of Mihailo I, Zeta was a župa within Duklja and was also known as Luška župa. From the end of the 11th century, the name began to be used to refer to the whole of Duklja, at first in Kekaumenos's military manual, written in the 1080s. Over the following decades, the term Zeta gradually replaced Duklja to denote the region.

== History ==
Serbian Prince Desa Urošević conquered Duklja and Travunia in 1148, combining the title as "Prince of Primorje" (the Maritime) and co-ruled Serbia with his brother Uroš II Prvoslav from 1149 to 1153, and alone until 1162.

In 1190, Grand Župan of Rascia and Stefan Nemanja's son, Vukan II, asserted his right over Zeta. In 1219, Đorđe Nemanjić succeeded Vukan. He was succeeded by his second oldest son, Uroš I, who built the 'Uspenje Bogorodice' monastery in Morača.

Between 1276 and 1309, Zeta was ruled by Queen Jelena, widow of Serbia's King Uroš I. She restored around 50 monasteries in the region, most notably Saint Srđ and Vakh on the Bojana River. From 1309 to 1321, Zeta was co-ruled by the oldest son of King Milutin, Young King Stefan Uroš III Dečanski. Similarly, from 1321 to 1331, Stefan's young son Stefan Dušan Uroš IV Nemanjić, the future Serbian King and Emperor, co-ruled Zeta with his father.

=== Reign of Stefan Dušan ===
Dušan the Mighty was crowned Emperor in 1331, and ruled until his death in 1355.

Žarko held the Lower Zeta region: he is mentioned in records from 1356, when he raided some traders from Dubrovnik, not far from Sveti Srđ at Lake Skadar. Zeta itself was held by the widow of Dušan, Jelena, who at the time was in Serres where she had her court. The next year, in June, Žarko becomes a citizen of the Republic of Venice, where he was known as "baron lord of the Serbian King, with holdings in the Zeta region and Bojana of the maritime".

Đuraš Ilijić was "Head" (Kefalija, from Greek Kephale) of Upper Zeta until his murder in 1362. Đuraš had been killed by the sons of a Balša, a nobleman that held one village during the reign of Dušan.

== Aftermath ==
After Dušan, his son, Uroš the Weak ruled Serbia during the fall of the Serbian Empire; a gradual disintegration of the Empire was a result of decentralization in which provincial lords gained semi-autonomy and eventually independence. The Balšićs wrestled the region in 1360-1362, when they defeated the two lords of Upper and Lower Zeta. Over the decades, they became an important player in the politics of the Balkans.

The Lordship was reunified with the Serbian crown in 1421, when Balša III abdicated and passed the rule to his uncle, Despot Stefan Lazarević.

== See also ==
- Serbian Orthodox Eparchy of Zeta

== Sources ==
- Božić, I. (1950) O položaju Zete u državi Nemanjića. Istorijski glasnik, Beograd, (1-2): 97-122
- Ćirković, Sima (2004). The Serbs. Malden: Blackwell Publishing. ISBN 9781405142915.
- Curta, Florin (2006). Southeastern Europe in the Middle Ages, 500–1250. Cambridge: Cambridge University Press. ISBN 978-0-521-81539-0.
- Fine, John V. A. Jr. (1991) [1983]. The Early Medieval Balkans: A Critical Survey from the Sixth to the Late Twelfth Century. Ann Arbor: University of Michigan Press. ISBN 0-472-08149-7.
- Fine, John V. A. Jr. (1994) [1987]. The Late Medieval Balkans: A Critical Survey from the Late Twelfth Century to the Ottoman Conquest. Ann Arbor, Michigan: University of Michigan Press. ISBN 978-0-472-10079-8. OCLC 749133662.
- Kovačević, J. (1955) Tradicija o Dukljanskom kraljevstvu kod Nemanjića. Istorijski časopis, 5, 291-294.
- Orbini, Mauro (1601). Il Regno de gli Slavi hoggi corrottamente detti Schiavoni. Pesaro: Apresso Girolamo Concordia.
- Орбин, Мавро (1968). Краљевство Словена. Београд: Српска књижевна задруга.
- Popović, Svetlana (2002). "The Serbian Episcopal sees in the thirteenth century". Старинар (51: 2001): 171–184.
- Sedlar, Jean W. (1994). East Central Europe in the Middle Ages, 1000-1500. Seattle: University of Washington Press. ISBN 9780295800646.
- Soulis, George Christos (1984). The Serbs and Byzantium during the reign of Tsar Stephen Dušan (1331-1355) and his successors. Washington: Dumbarton Oaks Library and Collection. ISBN 9780884021377.
- Stanković, Vlada, ed. (2016). The Balkans and the Byzantine World before and after the Captures of Constantinople, 1204 and 1453. Lanham, Maryland: Lexington Books. ISBN 9781498513265.
