= List of former toponyms in Drama Prefecture =

Many settlements in Greek Macedonia had Greek and non-Greek forms. Most of those names were in use during the multinational environment of the Ottoman Empire. Some of the forms were identifiably of Greek origin, others of Slavic, yet others of Turkish or more obscure origins. Following the First World War and the Græco-Turkish War which followed, an exchange of population took place between Greece, Serbia, Bulgaria and Turkey. (Treaty of Neuilly, between Greece and Bulgaria and Treaty of Lausanne, between Greece and Turkey). The villages of the exchanged populations (Bulgarians and Muslims) in Greece were resettled with Greeks from Asia Minor, especially Pontic Greeks and local Macedonian Greeks.

Since the Greek state became ethnic the Greek government renamed many places with revived ancient names, local Greek-language names, or translations of the non-Greek names. The multi-ethnic names were officially removed and the former multiethnic composition of the region was almost denied.
A lot of historical Greek names from Asia Minor were also introduced in the region mainly by the resettled refugees.
Many Demotic Greek names were also replaced by a Katharevousa Greek form, usually different only morphologically.

Slavic language
Turkish language

Slavic name(s)	Current official name other Greek names	Prefecture	Geographic Coordinates	Citation	Population (2001)	Other
Arapli (Арапли)	Vathychori (Βαθυχώρι, Βαθυχώριον)	Drama	41°07′N 24°17′E	p. 139	275	
Arpadzhik (Арпаджик)	Sterna (Στέρνα)	Drama	41°15′N 24°35′E	p. 139	36	
Ashaa Makhale (Ашаа Махале)	Evrypedo (Ευρύπεδο, Ευρύπεδον)	Drama	41°07′N 24°16′E	p. 140; GeoNames	186	
Balaban (Балабан)	Trachonio (Τραχώνιον)	Drama	41°21′N 24°38′E	p. 140		
Balkalar (Балкалар)	Ypsilokastro (Υψηλόκαστρο, Υψηλόκαστρον)	Drama	41°11′N 24°19′E	p. 140	68	
Baltadzhilar (Балтаджилар)	Pelekiti (Πελεκητή)	Drama	41°10′N 24°25′E	p. 140; GeoNames	30	
Bakhan, Bakhova (Бахан, Бахова)	Trigono (Τρίγωνον)	Drama	41°25′N 24°29′E	p. 141		
Bekleshti (Беклещи)	Chrysostomo (Χρυσόστομος)	Drama	41°11′N 24°25′E	p. 141		
Bektashli, Bektash (Бекташли, Бекташ)	Skliopetra (Σκληρόπετρα)	Drama	41°09′N 24°22′E	p. 141		
Belen (Белен)	Silli (Σίλλη)	Drama	41°21′N 24°32′E	p. 141	44	
Belotintsi (Белотинци)	Lefkogia (Λευκόγεια)	Drama	41°24′N 23°54′E	p. 142; GeoNames	573	
Beresatli, Bresatli (Бересатли, Бресатли)	Kavalaris (Καβαλάρις)	Drama	41°14′N 24°28′E	p. 142		
Berchishta (Берчища)	Ptelea (Πτελέα)	Drama	41°13′N 24°27′E	p. 142	376	
Bichovo (Бичово)	Petrotopos (Πετρότοπος)	Drama	41°23′N 24°20′E	p. 142		
Blatsen (Блацен)	Achladia (Αχλαδέα)	Drama	41°24′N 24°01′E	p. 143; GeoNames	86	
Bobolets, Bublich (Боболец, Бублич)	Pyrgoi (Πύργοι)	Drama	41°15′N 24°02′E	p. 143	318	
Boren (Борен)	Agios Athanasios (Άγιος Αθανάσιος)	Drama	41°04′N 24°14′E	p. 143	3,465	
Bornik (Борник)	Asvestolithos (Ασβεστόλιθος)	Drama	41°20′N 24°11′E	p. 144		
Borovo (Борово)	Potamoi (Ποταμοί)	Drama	41°24′N 24°06′E	p. 144	413	
Boshinos (Бошинос)	Kalamon (Καλαμών)	Drama	41°01′N 24°13′E	p. 144	786	
Buk (Бук)	Paranesti (Παρανέστι, Παρανέστιον)	Drama	41°16′N 24°30′E	p. 144	619	
Bukovo (Буково)	Oxya (Οξυά)	Drama	41°23′N 24°31′E	p. 145		
Bunar Bashi, Gorno Bunar Bashi (Бунар Баши, Горно Бунар Баши)	Ano Kefalari (Άνω Κεφαλάρι, Κεφαλάρι, Άνω Κεφαλάριον, Κεφαλάριον)	Drama	41°04′N 24°15′E	p. 145	472	
Burazanli (Буразанли)	Myrovlitis (Μυροβλήτης)	Drama	41°10′N 24°19′E	p. 145; GeoNames		
Buradzhik (Бураджик)	Vrachochori (Βραχοχώρι)	Drama	41°33′N 24°06′E	p. 146		
Burnadzhik, Purnadzhik (Бурнаджик, Пурнаджик)	Thamnoto (Θαμνωτό, Θαμνωτόν)	Drama	41°12′N 24°25′E	p. 146	48	
Bursovo (Бурсово)	Anthochori (Ανθοχώρι, Ανθοχώριον)	Drama	41°08′N 23°56′E	p. 146	155	
Burkhovo (Бурхово)	Kokkinia, Kokkino (Κοκκινιά, Κόκκινο)	Drama	41°22′N 24°16′E	p. 146		
Butim (Бутим)	Kritharas (Κριθαράς)	Drama	41°23′N 23°59′E	p. 146		
Budzhak (Буджак)	Vathyspilo (Βαθύσπηλο, Βαθύσπηλον)	Drama	41°05′N 24°18′E	p. 147	243	
Vezme (Везме)	Exochi (Εξοχή)	Drama	41°25′N 23°50′E	p. 147	179	
Visochani (Височани)	Xiropotamos (Ξηροπόταμος)	Drama	41°12′N 24°06′E	p. 147	2,601	
Vitovo (Витово)	Delta (Δέλτα)	Drama	41°25′N 24°05′E	p. 148		
Vladikovo (Владиково)	Oropedio, Oropedion (Οροπέδιο, Οροπέδιον)	Drama	41°20′N 24°15′E	p. 148	40	
Vodovishta (Водовища)	Agia Paraskevi, Valtochori (Αγία Παρασκευή, Βαλτοχώριον)	Drama	41°02′N 24°09′E	p. 148	501	
Volak (Волак)	Volax (Βώλαξ)	Drama	41°19′N 24°00′E	p. 149	1,190	
Volkovo (Волково)	Chrysokefalos (Χρυσοκέφαλος)	Drama	41°22′N 23°52′E	p. 149	301	
Vrashten (Връщен)	Virsan (Βήρσαν)	Drama	41°21′N 24°06′E	p. 149		
Gasorijani (Гасорияни)	Polypetron (Πολύπετρον)	Drama	41°06′N 24°19′E	p. 150		
Gerikli (Герикли)	Gyros (Γύρος)	Drama	41°12′N 24°19′E	p. 150; GeoNames	18	
Glum (Глум)	Plakostroton (Πλακόστρωτον)	Drama	41°22′N 24°17′E	p. 150; GeoNames		
Gogcheli (Гогчели)	Prinolofos (Πρινόλοφος)	Drama	41°12′N 24°23′E	p. 151	97	
Golak (Голак)	Perichora (Περιχώρα)	Drama	41°05′N 23°57′E	p. 151	361	
Golemo Sivindrik (Големо Сивиндрик)	Megalokampos (Μεγαλόκαμπος)	Drama	41°07′N 24°00′E	p. 151	427	
Gorentsi (Горенци)	Kali Vrysi (Καλή Βρύση)	Drama	41°09′N 23°55′E	p. 151	1,065	
Gorno Ali Kyoy (Горно Али Кьой)	Ano Mandria (Άνω Μανδριά)	Drama	41°29′N 24°24′E	p. 152		
Gorno Shimshirli (Горно Шимширли)	Ano Pixari (Άνω Πυξάρι, Άνω Πυξάριον)	Drama	41°10′N 24°19′E	p. 152	41	
Gornovo, Gorunovo (Горново, Горуново)	Vounoplagia (Βουνοπλαγιά)	Drama	41°20′N 24°32′E	p. 152		
Gramenitsa (Граменица)	Grameni (Γραμμένη)	Drama	41°13′N 23°54′E	p. 152	460	
Grozdel, Gurzhdel (Гроздел, Гурждел)	Magnision (Μαγνήσιον)	Drama	41°21′N 24°18′E	p. 153; GeoNames		
Dala, Dalya (Дала, Даля)	Potamaki, Potamakion (Ποταμάκι, Ποταμάκιον)	Drama	41°20′N 24°36′E	p. 153		
Debredzhik (Дебреджик)	Achladomilea (Αχλαδομηλέα)	Drama	41°25′N 24°00′E	p. 153; GeoNames		
Dedeler (Деделер)	Kapnofito (Καπνόφυτο, Καπνόφυτον)	Drama	41°15′N 24°30′E	p. 153; GeoNames	30	
Dedeli (Дедели)	Sikadi (Συκάδι)	Drama	41°10′N 24°21′E	p. 154		
Demirdzhoyani (Демирджояни)	Peristeria (Περιστέρια)	Drama	41°08′N 24°24′E	p. 154	27	
Dere Kyoy, Dere Makhale (Дере Кьой, Дере Махале)	Vathy Revma (Βαθύ Ρεύμα)	Drama	41°29′N 24°15′E	p. 154		
Dizmikli (Дизмикли)	Pigadia (Πηγάδια)	Drama	41°07′N 24°18′E	p. 155; GeoNames	255	
Doblen, D'blen (Доблен, Д'блен)	Diplochorion (Διπλοχώριον)	Drama	41°25′N 24°08′E	p. 155; GeoNames		
Dobroshul (Доброшул)	Xilokopos (Ξυλοκόπος)	Drama	41°15′N 24°15′E	p. 155		
Dovlar, Doalar (Довлар, Доалар)	Marmaria (Μαρμαριά)	Drama	41°10′N 24°20′E	p. 155; GeoNames	82	
Doksat (Доксат)	Doxato (Δοξάτο, Δοξάτον)	Drama	41°06′N 24°14′E	p. 156	3,739	
Dolno Ali Kyoy (Долно Али Кьой)	Kato Mandria (Κάτω Μανδριά)	Drama	41°28′N 24°24′E	p. 156		
Dolno Brodi (Долно Броди)	Kato Vrontou (Κάτω Βροντού)	Drama	41°16′N 23°46′E	p. 156	528	
Dolno Bunar Bashi (Долно Бунар Баши)	Kato Kefalari (Κάτω Κεφαλάρι, Κάτω Κεφαλάριον)	Drama	41°04′N 24°15′E	p. 157	379	
Dolno Karadzhi Kyoy (Долно Караджи Кьой)	Kato Tholos (Κάτω Θόλος)	Drama	41°16′N 24°30′E	p. 157	163	
Dolno Makhaledzhik (Долно Махаледжик)	Kato Milorevma (Κάτω Μυλόρρευμα)	Drama	41°26′N 23°55′E	p. 158		
Dolno Shimshirli (Долно Шимширли)	Kato Pixari, Kato Pixarion (Κάτω Πυξάριον)	Drama	41°11′N 24°19′E	p. 158		
Dospat (Доспат)	Prinotopos (Πρινότοπος)	Drama	41°13′N 23°54′E	p. 158		
Drachishta (Драчища)	Melissochorion (Μελισσοχώριον)	Drama	41°19′N 24°24′E	p. 159		
Drenovo, Dranovo (Дреново, Драново)	Monastiraki (Μοναστηράκιον)	Drama	41°10′N 24°12′E	p. 159	781	
Durakli (Дуракли)	Tracheia (Τραχεία)	Drama	41°06′N 24°17′E	p. 159		
Gyur Makhale (Гюр Махале)	Likofolia (Λυκοφωλιά)	Drama	41°20′N 24°19′E	p. 160		
Gyurekler (Гюреклер)	Mikrolofos (Μικρόλοφος)	Drama	41°13′N 24°22′E	p. 160		
Gyuredzhik (Гюреджик)	Granitis (Γρανίτης)	Drama	41°17′N 23°56′E	p. 160	102	
Gyusterek (Гюстерек)	Charakas (Χάρακας)	Drama	41°27′N 23°57′E	p. 160		
Egri Dere (Егри Дере)	Kallithea (Καλλιθέα)	Drama	41°07′N 23°56′E	p. 160; GeoNames	626	
Edi Pere, Gedi Pere (Еди Пере, Геди Пере)	Nerofraktis (Νεροφράκτης)	Drama	41°03′N 24°08′E	p. 161	724	
Edrenedzhik (Едренеджик)	Adriani (Αδριανή)	Drama	41°08′N 24°16′E	p. 161	1,371	
Eni Chiflik (Ени Чифлик)	Nea Sevastia, Sevastianon (Νέα Σεβάστεια, Σεβαστιανόν)	Drama	41°08′N 24°08′E	p. 162	480	
Eski Kyoy (Ески Кьой)	Nikotsaras (Νικοτσάρας)	Drama	41°08′N 24°03′E	p. 162	309	
Efteliya (Ефтелия)	Ftelia, Ptelea Doxatou (Φτελιά, Πτελέα Δοξάτου)	Drama	41°05′N 24°11′E	p. 162	981	
Zagush (Загуш)	Zagous (Ζάγγους)	Drama	41°14′N 23°52′E	p. 163		
Zarich (Зарич)	Ypsili Rachi, Yili Rachi (Υψηλή Ράχη, Υηλή Ράχη)	Drama	41°13′N 24°21′E	p. 163	344	
Zembil Makaha, Shubrilovo (Зембил Макаха, Шубрилово)	Pefkolofos (Πευκόλοφος)	Drama	41°28′N 24°29′E	p. 164		
Zarnovitsa (Зърновица)	Kastanochoma (Καστανόχωμα)	Drama	41°20′N 24°10′E	p. 164; GeoNames		
Zarnovo (Зърново)	Kato Nevrokopi (Κάτω Νευροκόπιο, Κάτω Νευροκόπιον)	Drama	41°21′N 23°52′E	p. 164	2,072	
Ibishler (Ибишлер)	Parameron (Παράμερον)	Drama	41°20′N 24°27′E	p. 164		
Izbishta (Избища)	Agriokerasea (Αγριοκερασέα)	Drama	41°27′N 24°04′E	p. 165		
Ilidzhe, L'dzha (Илидже, Л'джа)	Thermia (Θερμιά)	Drama	41°29′N 24°26′E	p. 165		
Indzharli (Инджарли)	Polisiko, Polisikon (Πολύσυκο, Πολύσυκον)	Drama	41°18′N 24°28′E	p. 165	28	
Yavor (Явор)	Diameson (Διάμεσον)	Drama	41°22′N 24°30′E	p. 165		
Yanozlu (Янозлу)	Karpoforo (Καρποφόρο, Καρποφόρον)	Drama	41°17′N 24°27′E	p. 166	69	
Kavakli (Кавакли)	Aigeiros (Αίγειρος)	Drama	41°07′N 24°21′E	p. 166; GeoNames	0	
Kain Chal (Каин Чал)	Antilalos (Αντίλαλος)	Drama	41°32′N 24°15′E	p. 166		
Kalambak (Каламбак)	Kalampaki (Καλαμπάκι, Καλαμπάκιον)	Drama	41°03′N 24°11′E	p. 167	3,489	
Kalapot (Калапот)	Panorama, Palaion Kalapotion (Πανόραμα, Παλαιόν Καλαπότιον)	Drama	41°14′N 23°49′E	p. 167	66	
Kara Dere (Кара Дере)	Elatia (Ελατιάς)	Drama	41°29′N 24°18′E	p. 168; GeoNames		
Kara Kavak (Кара Кавак)	Mavrolefki (Μαυρολεύκη)	Drama	41°03′N 24°06′E	p. 168; GeoNames	563	
Kara Kyoy, Manastir (Кара Кьой, Манастир)	Katafyto (Κατάφυτο, Κατάφυτον)	Drama	41°21′N 23°41′E	p. 168	165	
Kara Chali (Кара Чали)	Mavrovatos (Μαυρόβατος)	Drama	41°07′N 24°09′E	p. 169; GeoNames	714	
Karagyoz Kyoy (Карагьоз Кьой)	Perivlepto (Περίβλεπτο, Περίβλεπτον)	Drama	41°17′N 24°24′E	p. 169	39	
Karamanli (Караманли)	Terpsithea (Τερψιθέα)	Drama	41°10′N 24°22′E	p. 169	67	
Karadzha Kyoy (Караджа Кьой)	Tholos (Θόλος)	Drama	41°18′N 24°31′E	p. 169	14	
Karilovo, Kievo (Карилово, Киево)	Zarkadia (Ζαρκάδια)	Drama	41°23′N 24°29′E	p. 170		
Karlukovo, Karlikovo (Карлуково, Карликово)	Mikropoli (Μικρόπολη, Μικρόπολης)	Drama	41°11′N 23°49′E	p. 170	1,102	
Karshi Chiflik, Kyuchuk Chiflik (Карши Чифлик, Кючук Чифлик)	Xagnanto (Ξάγναντο, Ξάγναντον)	Drama	41°17′N 24°29′E	p. 170	117	
Kasapli, Khasapli (Касапли, Хасапли)	Ypsilon (Υψηλόν)	Drama	41°07′N 24°18′E	p. 171; GeoNames	53	
Katun (Катун)	Dipotama (Διπόταμα)	Drama	41°22′N 24°37′E	p. 171; GeoNames	18	
Kashitsa (Кашица)	Kritharistra (Κριθαρίστρα)	Drama	41°28′N 24°08′E	p. 171		
Keli (Кели)	Kelli (Κελλή)	Drama	41°11′N 24°19′E	p. 171		
Kechilik (Кечилик)	Mesokoryfon (Μεσοκόρυφον)	Drama	41°04′N 24°19′E	p. 172; GeoNames		
Kiranli, Kranli (Киранли, Кранли)	Mikrolivadi (Μικρολιβάδι, Μικρολιβάδιον)	Drama	41°10′N 24°22′E	p. 172	28	
Klebochar, Kalbuchar (Клебочар, Калбучар)	Kopsis (Κόψις)	Drama	41°15′N 24°21′E	p. 172		
Kobalishta (Кобалища)	Kokkinogia (Κοκκινόγεια)	Drama	41°11′N 23°56′E	p. 172	600	
Kovishta (Ковища)	Vathylakkos (Βαθύλακκος)	Drama	41°14′N 24°10′E	p. 172	85	
Kozlu Kyoy (Козлу Кьой)	Platania (Πλατανιά)	Drama	41°11′N 24°25′E	p. 173	686	
Koliarba, Kularya (Колиарба, Куларя)	Erimokklisia (Ερημοκκλησιά)	Drama	41°27′N 24°11′E	p. 173		
Kolibi na Lyapi (Колиби на Ляпи)	Oreinon, Kalyvia Liapi (Ορεινόν, Καλύβια Λιάπι)	Drama	41°09′N 24°23′E	p. 173		
Kolyush (Колюш)	Kleista (Κλειστά)	Drama	41°24′N 24°19′E	p. 173		
Konitsa, Konishten (Коница, Конищен)	Pefkoi (Πεύκοι)	Drama	41°25′N 24°31′E	p. 173; GeoNames		
Kopuchuk (Копучук)	Polykipon (Πολύκηπον)	Drama	41°21′N 24°23′E	p. 174; GeoNames		
Kosten (Костен)	Psychron (Ψυχρόν)	Drama	41°26′N 24°10′E	p. 174		
Kranishta (Кранища)	Dendrakia (Δενδράκια)	Drama	41°16′N 24°11′E	p. 174	46	
Kumanich (Куманич)	Dasoto (Δασωτό, Δασωτόν)	Drama	41°21′N 23°48′E	p. 174	224	
Kurtalar (Курталар)	Lykodiaselon (Λυκοδιάσελον)	Drama	41°16′N 24°19′E	p. 175; GeoNames		
Lakavitsa, Gorna Lakavitsa (Лакавица, Горна Лакавица)	Lakkouda (Λακκούδα)	Drama	41°24′N 24°11′E	p. 176; GeoNames		
Lakavitsa, Dolna Lakavitsa (Лакавица, Долна Лакавица)	Mikrokleisoura (Μικροκλεισούρα)	Drama	41°23′N 24°04′E	p. 176; GeoNames	113	
Lachishta (Лачища)	Proasti (Προάστιον)	Drama	41°08′N 24°09′E	p. 176		
Leyler, Gyuz Makhale (Лейлер, Гюз Махале)	Lykiskos (Λυκίσκος)	Drama	41°15′N 24°19′E	p. 176		
Leshten (Лещен)	Farasinon (Φαρασηνόν)	Drama	41°28′N 24°31′E	p. 176		
Liboten (Либотен)	Mavrokordatos (Μαυροκορδάτος)	Drama	41°14′N 24°23′E	p. 177; GeoNames	103	
Livadishta (Ливадищта)	Livadaki (Λιβαδάκιον)	Drama	41°23′N 23°59′E	p. 177		
Lise (Лисе)	Ochyro (Οχυρό, Οχυρόν)	Drama	41°18′N 23°51′E	p. 177; GeoNames	510	
Lishen (Лишен)	Polynerion (Πολυνέριο, Πολυνέριον)	Drama	41°15′N 24°26′E	p. 177	32	
Lovcha (Ловча)	Akrinon (Ακρινόν)	Drama	41°24′N 23°41′E	p. 178		
Lovchishta (Ловчища)	Kallikarpo (Καλλίκαρπο, Καλλίκαρπον)	Drama	41°24′N 24°13′E	p. 178	50	
Lozna, Lozena (Лозна, Лозена)	Kremasta (Κρεμαστά)	Drama	41°24′N 24°03′E	p. 178		
Lokatna (Локатна)	Vounokoryfi (Βουνοκορυφή)	Drama	41°21′N 24°28′E	p. 178		
Lyuban, Liban (Любан, Либан)	Skaloti (Σκαλωτή)	Drama	41°25′N 24°17′E	p. 179	84	
Malo Sivindrik (Мало Сивиндрик)	Mikrokampos (Μικρόκαμπος)	Drama	41°08′N 24°01′E	p. 179	340	
Maloshiitsa, Malushishta (Малошиица, Малушища)	Melissomandra (Μελισσομάνδρα)	Drama	41°26′N 24°07′E	p. 179		
Makhaledzhik (Махаледжик)	Timotheos (Τιμόθεος)	Drama	41°14′N 24°11′E	p. 180		
Makhaledzhik, Gorno Makhaledzhik (Махаледжик, Горно Махаледжик)	Ano Milorrevma, Milorevma (Άνω Μυλόρρευμα, Μυλόρρευμα)	Drama	41°25′N 23°55′E	p. 180		
Meze, Meshe (Мезе, Меше)	Piges (Πηγές, Πηγαί)	Drama	41°13′N 23°55′E	p. 180; GeoNames	71	
Preobrazhenie Hristovo (Преображение Христово)	Metamorfosis Sotiros (Μεταμόρφωσις Σωτήρος)	Drama	41°08′N 24°07′E	p. 180	176	
Minare Chiflik (Минаре Чифлик)	Sitagroi (Σιταγροί)	Drama	41°07′N 24°02′E	p. 181	998	
Mokresh, Mikrosh, Mukrash (Мокреш, Микрош, Мукраш)	Livadero, Mokros (Λιβαδερό, Λιβαδερόν, Μοκρός)	Drama	41°17′N 24°13′E	p. 181	100	
Monastirdzhik, Manastir (Монастирджик, Манастир)	Ekklisaki (Εκκλησάκι)	Drama	41°31′N 24°05′E	p. 181		
Muzhdel (Муждел)	Mylopetra (Μυλόπετρα)	Drama	41°25′N 24°13′E	p. 182		
Muzga (Музга)	Koudounia (Κουδούνια)	Drama	41°06′N 24°07′E	p. 182; GeoNames	885	
Muselim (Муселим)	Aidonokastro (Αηδονόκαστρο, Αηδονόκαστρον)	Drama	41°16′N 24°29′E	p. 182; GeoNames	32	
Novo Kalapot (Ново Калапот)	Angitis, Neon Kalapotion (Αγγίτης, Νέον Καλαπότιον)	Drama	41°13′N 23°54′E	p. 183	108	
Nusretli (Нусретли)	Nikiforos (Νικηφόρος)	Drama	41°10′N 24°19′E	p. 183	436	
Ovadzhik (Оваджик)	Drymotopos (Δρυμότοπος)	Drama	41°09′N 24°29′E	p. 183; GeoNames	40	
Ola, Ola Bektash (Ола, Ола Бекташ)	Platanovrysi (Πλατανόβρυση)	Drama	41°10′N 24°23′E	p. 184	162	
Organdzhi (Органджи)	Kyrgia (Κύργια, Κύρια)	Drama	41°06′N 24°18′E	p. 184; GeoNames	1,714	
Ormanli, Ormanli Makhala (Орманли, Орманли Махала)	Polykarpos, Polykarpon (Πολύκαρπος, Πολύκαρπον)	Drama	41°16′N 24°18′E	p. 184	10	
Orkhovo, Orovo (Орхово, Орово)	Stavrodromi (Σταυροδρόμι)	Drama	41°22′N 24°19′E	p. 185		
Osenitsa (Осеница)	Sidironero (Σιδηρόνερο, Σιδηρόνερον)	Drama	41°22′N 24°14′E	p. 185	206	
Osmanitsa (Османица)	Kalos Agros (Καλός Αγρός)	Drama	41°06′N 24°05′E	p. 185; GeoNames	1,216	
Oshtitsa, Voshtitsa (Ощица, Вощица)	Mikromilia (Μικρομηλιά, Μικρομηλέα)	Drama	41°25′N 24°10′E	p. 185	62	
Pazarlar (Пазарлар)	Agora (Αγορά)	Drama	41°08′N 24°19′E	p. 186; GeoNames	192	
Pastrovo (Пастрово)	Kallikrounon (Καλλίκρουνον)	Drama	41°16′N 24°24′E	p. 186		
Pashali Chiflik (Пашали Чифлик)	Ampelakia (Αμπελάκια)	Drama	41°08′N 24°07′E	p. 186; GeoNames	335	
Pashina (Пашина)	Passina (Πάσσινα)	Drama	41°13′N 23°57′E	p. 186		
Pepelash (Пепелаш)	Myrsineron (Μυρσινερόν)	Drama	41°20′N 24°08′E	p. 187		
Perukh, Perov (Перух, Перов)	Agios Petros (Άγιος Πέτρος)	Drama	41°21′N 24°06′E	p. 187		
Plevna (Плевна)	Petroussa (Πετρούσσα)	Drama	41°12′N 24°01′E	p. 187; GeoNames	1,945	
Pontii (Понтии)	Pontioi (Πόντιοι)	Drama	41°03′N 24°02′E	p. 187		
Popovo Selo, Papas Kyoy (Попово Село, Папас Кьой)	Papades (Παππάδες)	Drama	41°21′N 24°11′E	p. 188	50	
Pochen (Почен)	Potsen (Πότσεν)	Drama	41°31′N 24°07′E	p. 188		
Priboyna (Прибойна)	Vounochorion (Βουνοχώριον)	Drama	41°26′N 24°14′E	p. 188		
Provalar (Провалар)	Saxinis (Σαχίνης)	Drama	41°13′N 24°25′E	p. 188		
Prosochen (Просочен)	Prosotsani, Pirsopolis (Προσοτσάνη, Πυρσόπολις)	Drama	41°10′N 23°59′E	p. 189	3,937	
Ravena, Ravna (Равена, Равна)	Makryplagio (Μακρυπλάγιο, Μακρυπλάγιον)	Drama	41°14′N 24°16′E	p. 189	74	
Ravika, Ryahovitsa (Равика, Ряховица)	Kallifytos (Καλλίφυτος)	Drama	41°10′N 24°13′E	p. 189; GeoNames	1,083	
Radibosh (Радибош)	Aetorrachi (Αετορράχη)	Drama	41°23′N 24°26′E	p. 190		
Radishani (Радишани)	Monopati (Μονοπάτι)	Drama	41°22′N 24°24′E	p. 190		
Razhenik (Раженик)	Charadra (Χαράδρα)	Drama	41°17′N 24°15′E	p. 190; GeoNames		
Rakishten (Ракищен)	Katachloron (Κατάχλωρον)	Drama	41°27′N 24°01′E	p. 190		
Rapesh, Rabesh (Рапеш, Рабеш)	Drepanion (Δρεπάνιον)	Drama	41°17′N 24°19′E	p. 191		
Rashovo (Рашово)	Leimon (Λειμών)	Drama	41°28′N 24°14′E	p. 191		
Rosilovo (Росилово)	Charitomeni (Χαριτωμένη)	Drama	41°10′N 23°51′E	p. 191	607	
Ruskovo, Rosilovo (Русково, Росилово)	Kaisarianon (Καισαριανόν)	Drama	41°25′N 24°20′E	p. 191		
Rusovo (Русово)	Mavrolithion (Μαυρολίθιον)	Drama	41°15′N 24°13′E	p. 191		
Sadik Chiflik (Садик Чифлик)	Arkadikos (Αρκαδικός)	Drama	41°09′N 24°08′E	p. 192; GeoNames		
Siderovo (Сидерово)	Mesovouni (Μεσοβούνιον)	Drama	41°21′N 24°05′E	p. 193		
Skranovo (Скраново)	Rachoula (Ραχούλα)	Drama	41°20′N 24°30′E	p. 193		
Krast (Кръст)	Stavros (Σταυρός)	Drama	41°10′N 24°03′E	p. 193	132	
Staredzhik, Srchan (Стареджик, Срчан)	Polylithon (Πολύλιθον)	Drama	41°27′N 24°08′E	p. 193		
Starchishta (Старчища)	Perithori (Περιθώριο, Περιθώριον)	Drama	41°19′N 23°47′E	p. 193	833	
Stranen, Istrane (Странен, Истране)	Perasma (Πέρασμα)	Drama	41°22′N 24°06′E	p. 194; GeoNames	28	
Surudzhiler (Суруджилер)	Teichos (Τείχος)	Drama	41°12′N 24°20′E	p. 194	68	
Teklievo, Teklevo (Теклиево, Теклево)	Kastaneai (Καστανέαι)	Drama	41°18′N 24°20′E	p. 195		
Tisovo (Тисово)	Mavrochori (Μαυροχώριον)	Drama	41°31′N 24°07′E	p. 195		
Tifuta (Тифута)	Tichota (Τιχότα)	Drama	41°20′N 24°21′E	p. 195		
Toma, Tomal (Тома, Томал)	Avgo (Αυγό)	Drama	41°27′N 24°28′E	p. 195; GeoNames		
Trlis (Трлис)	Vathytopos (Βαθύτοπος)	Drama	41°21′N 24°43′E	p. 195	416	
Tukovo (Туково)	Leptokarya (Λεπτοκάρυα)	Drama	41°21′N 24°24′E	p. 196		
Turkokhor (Туркохор)	Mylopotamos (Μυλοπόταμος)	Drama	41°09′N 24°05′E	p. 196	778	
Tufal, Tukhal (Туфал, Тухал)	Aetos (Αετός)	Drama	41°18′N 24°15′E	p. 196		
Kyoleli, Kyor Ali (Кьолели, Кьор Али)	Limniski (Λιμνίσκη)	Drama	41°10′N 24°24′E	p. 197; GeoNames		
Kyurkchiler (Кюркчилер)	Krini (Κρήνη)	Drama	41°16′N 24°34′E	p. 197; GeoNames	15	
Kyuchuk Kyoy (Кючук Кьой)	Mikrochori (Μικροχώρι, Μικροχώριον)	Drama	41°06′N 24°11′E	p. 197	598	
Kyuchuk Kyoy (Кючук Кьой)	Mikrochori (Μικροχώριον)	Drama	41°19′N 24°27′E	p. 197		
Fotilovo, Sachiven, Foteligo (Фотилово, Сачивен, Фотелиго)	Fotolivos (Φωτολίβος)	Drama	41°03′N 24°03′E	p. 198	1,871	
Khasan Balar (Хасан Балар)	Paliampela (Παλιάμπελα)	Drama	41°11′N 24°22′E	p. 199	99	
Himitli (Химитли)	Agapi (Αγάπη)	Drama	41°06′N 24°18′E	p. 199; GeoNames		
Holevan (Холеван)	Amisinon (Αμισηνόν)	Drama	41°19′N 24°35′E	p. 199; GeoNames		
Hodzhalar, Kosharlar (Ходжалар, Кошарлар)	Anidro (Άνυδρον)	Drama	41°13′N 24°19′E	p. 199		
Chay Chiflik (Чай Чифлик)	Nea Amisos (Νέα Αμισός)	Drama	41°08′N 24°07′E	p. 200; GeoNames		
Chali Makhale (Чали Махале)	Myrsinia (Μυρσινιά)	Drama	41°10′N 24°23′E	p. 201		
Chali Chiflik (Чали Чифлик)	Argyroupoli, Mavrotopos (Αργυρούπολη, Αργυρούπολης, Μαυρότοπος)	Drama	41°08′N 24°03′E	p. 201		
Chatak (Чатак)	Polygefyron (Πολυγέφυρον)	Drama	41°22′N 24°28′E	p. 201; GeoNames		
Chataldzha (Чаталджа)	Choristi (Χωριστή)	Drama	41°08′N 24°13′E	p. 202; GeoNames	2,625	
Chereshovo, Cheryashovo (Черешово, Черяшово)	Pagonerio (Παγονέριο, Παγονέριον)	Drama	41°24′N 24°02′E	p. 202	231	
Chereshovo (Черешово)	Thisavros (Θησαυρός)	Drama	41°23′N 24°22′E	p. 202		
Cherkovitsa, Cherkichen (Черковица, Черкичен)	Sykidia (Συκίδια)	Drama	41°21′N 24°20′E	p. 202		
Chernak (Чернак)	Strofes (Στροφές)	Drama	41°27′N 24°23′E	p. 203		
Chilekler (Чилеклер)	Chamokerasa (Χαμοκέρασα)	Drama	41°11′N 24°23′E	p. 203; GeoNames	115	
Chiflik, Godemo Fotilovo (Чифлик, Годемо Фотилово)	Mega Fotolivos (Μέγα Φωτολίβος)	Drama	41°03′N 24°03′E	p. 203		
Chiflik Makhale, Buyuk Chiflik (Чифлик Махале, Буюк Чифлик)	Mesochori (Μεσοχώρι, Μεσοχώριον)	Drama	41°16′N 24°29′E	p. 203; GeoNames	228	
Dzhami Mahale (Джами Махале)	Temenos (Τέμενος)	Drama	41°17′N 24°28′E	p. 204	62	
Dzhura, Chora, Zhura (Джура, Чора, Жура)	Prasinada (Πρασινάδα)	Drama	41°22′N 24°33′E	p. 204	100	
Shipsa (Шипса)	Taxiarches (Ταξιάρχες, Ταξιάρχαι)	Drama	41°14′N 24°13′E	p. 204		
Shurdilovo (Шурдилово)	Sourdilovo (Σουρδίλοβο)	Drama	41°29′N 24°06′E	p. 205		
