= List of settlements in the Drama regional unit =

This is a list of settlements in the Drama regional unit, Greece.

- Achladea
- Adriani
- Agia Paraskevi
- Agios Athanasios
- Agora
- Ano Pyxari
- Anthochori
- Argyroupoli
- Charitomeni
- Choristi
- Chrysokefalos
- Dasoto
- Doxato
- Drama
- Exochi
- Fotolivos
- Ftelia
- Grammeni
- Granitis
- Kalamon
- Kalampaki
- Kali Vrysi
- Kallifytos
- Kallithea
- Kalos Agros
- Katafyto
- Kato Nevrokopi
- Kato Vrontou
- Kefalari
- Kokkinogeia
- Koudounia
- Kyrgia
- Lefkogeia
- Livadero
- Makryplagio
- Mavrolefki
- Mavrovatos
- Megalokampos
- Mikrochori
- Mikrokampos
- Mikrokleisoura
- Mikromilia
- Mikropoli
- Monastiraki
- Mylopotamos
- Nerofraktis
- Nikiforos
- Nikotsaras
- Ochyro
- Pagonerio
- Panorama
- Paranesti
- Perichora
- Perithorio
- Petroussa
- Pigadia
- Platania
- Platanovrysi
- Potamoi
- Prosotsani
- Ptelea
- Pyrgoi
- Sidironero
- Silli
- Sitagroi
- Skaloti
- Tholos
- Vathylakkos
- Volakas
- Xiropotamos
- Ypsili Rachi

== See also ==
- Slavic toponyms of places in Drama Prefecture
- List of towns and villages in Greece
