= Ioannis Evaggelopoulos =

Greek soldier

Kapetan (Chieftain) Ioannis Evaggelopoulos
- Native name: Ιωάννης Ευαγγελόπουλος
- Born: c. 1880s Mikropoli, Adrianople Vilayet, Ottoman Empire (now Greece)
- Allegiance: Kingdom of Greece
- Service / branch: HMC
- Battles / wars: Macedonian Struggle

Ioannis Evaggelopoulos (Greek: Ιωάννης Ευαγγελόπουλος) was a Greek chieftain of the Macedonian Struggle from Mikropoli, Drama.

== Biography ==
Ioannis Evaggelopoulos was born in the end of the 19th century in Mikropoli. He cooperated with various Greek armed bands as a rifleman in the areas of Drama, Elassona, Pieria and Giannitsa, during the Macedonian Struggle. He was then put in charge of a guerilla force which fought against the Ottomans and Bulgarians in Olympus and in the area of Giannitsa.
