= Mikrokleisoura =

Mikrokleisoura may refer to the following villages in Greece:

- Mikrokleisoura, Drama, a settlement in the Drama regional unit
- Mikrokleisoura, Grevena
