= Ampelakia (disambiguation) =

Ampelakia may refer to:

- Ampelakia, on Salamis
- Ampelakia, Drama, see List of former toponyms in Drama Prefecture
- Ampelakia, Larissa
