= Kalamo =

Kalamo may refer to:

- Kalamo Township, Michigan
- Kalamon, Drama
- Kalamo, an Arabic–Malagasy pidgin spoken by the Antemoro people of Madagascar
