= Kalos =

Kalos may refer to:

- Kalos kagathos the good and the virtuous - the classical Greek ethos of human excellence, or arete
- Kalos, the fictional region and setting of Pokémon X and Y and Pokémon Legends: Z-A
- Kalos inscription, the form of epigraph found on Attic vases and graffiti in antiquity
- Daewoo Kalos, the original marketed name for the Chevrolet Aveo (T200)
- Kalos Agros, an ancient Roman town
