= Paliampela =

Paliampela or Paliambela (Greek: Παλιάμπελα, "old vineyards") may refer to a number of places in Greece:

- Paliampela, Aktio-Vonitsa, a village and a community in Aktio-Vonitsa
- Paliampela, Amfilochia, a village and a community in Amfilochia
- Paliampela, Drama, a village in Paranesti
- Paliampela, Larissa, a village in Elassona
- Paliampela, Naupactus, a village and a community in Naupactus
- Paliampela, Pieria, a village in Pydna-Kolindros
- Paliampela, Thessaloniki, a village in Volvi
