= Drama uprising =

1941 revolt against Bulgarian occupation in northeast Greece

- Part of Axis occupation of Greece
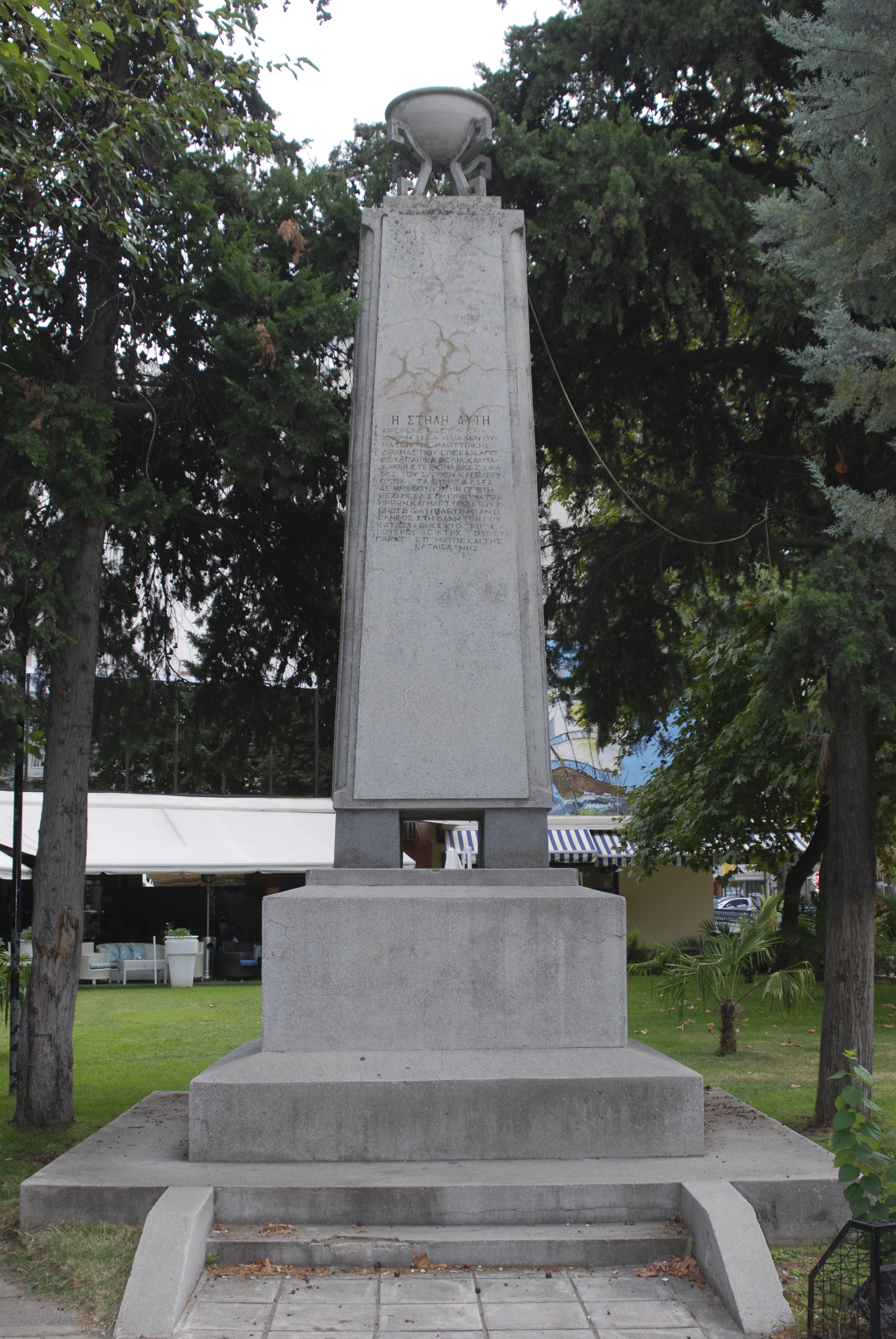
- Monument to the victims in Drama
Date	28–29 September 1941
Location	Drama, Bulgarian-annexed Greece
Result	Bulgarian victory: Rebellion suppressed; Massive reprisals by the Bulgarian Army

Belligerents
Greece; KKE	Bulgaria

Commanders and leaders
(Greece) Pantelis Chamalides; Apostolos Tzanis (executed)	(Tsardom of Bulgaria (1908–1946)) M. Michailov

Strength
(Greece) 1,300 soldiers	(Tsardom of Bulgaria (1908–1946)) Regular army

Casualties and losses
(Greece) Heavy	(Tsardom of Bulgaria (1908–1946)) Light

The Drama uprising (Greek: Εξέγερση της Δράμας; Bulgarian: Драмско въстание, romanized: Dramsko vastanie; Macedonian: Драмско востание) was an uprising of the population of the northern Greek city of Drama and the surrounding villages on 28–29 September 1941 against the Bulgarian occupation regime. The revolt lacked organization or military resources; the Bulgarian Army swiftly suppressed it, with massive reprisals. The revolt had guidance from the Communist Party of Greece (KKE).

== Background ==
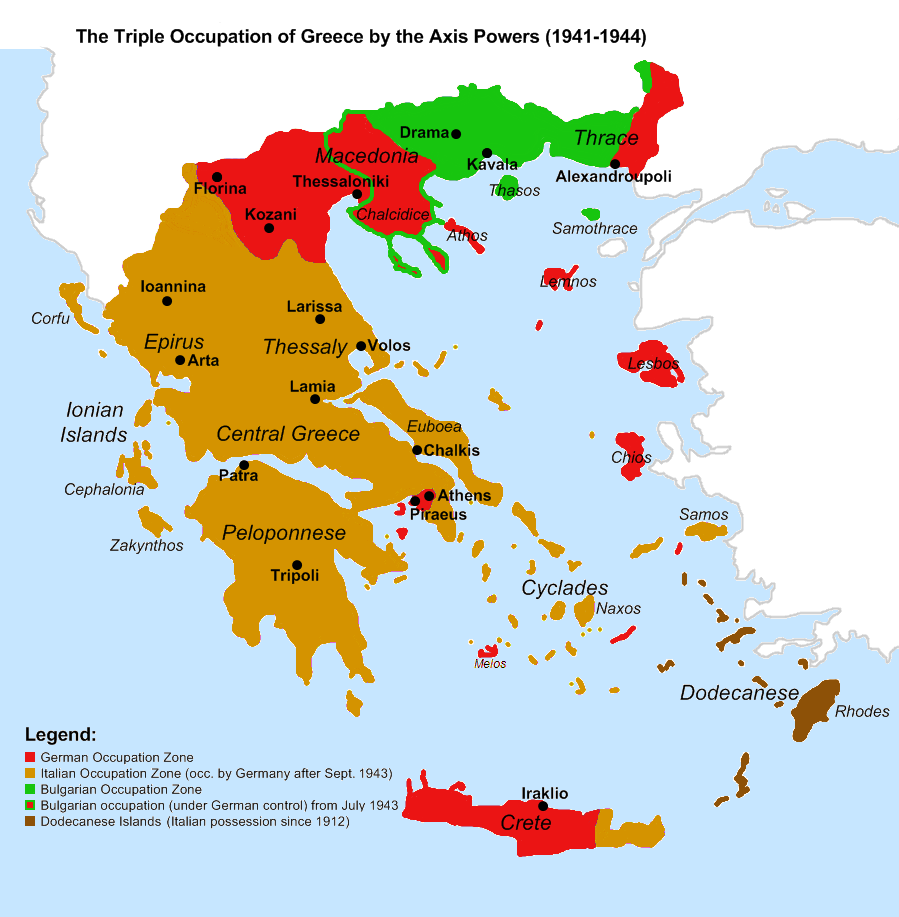
Map showing the Bulgarian-occupied areas of Greece (in green), and the location of Drama

The April 1941 German-led invasion of Greece was launched partly from Bulgaria, and on 20 April, just prior to the Greek surrender, I Corps of the Bulgarian Army crossed into Greece and occupied almost the whole of the northeastern part of the country east of the Strymon River. Unlike Germany and Italy in their respective occupation zones, Bulgaria officially annexed the occupied territories on 14 May 1941; they had long been a target of Bulgarian irredentism.

For the first few months, the Bulgarian occupation authorities attempted to gain the support of the local population, deploying a substantial propaganda campaign, establishing Bulgarian schools, and giving food and milk to Greek children. They quickly realised that this approach would bear no fruit, and instead implemented drastic measures to Bulgarise the occupied territories. Tsar Boris III personally visited the annexed areas on 28–30 April, and gave speeches to reassure the local Greek and Slavic population. After the German invasion of USSR in the summer of 1941, here appeared the first communist Partisans groups, which appealed towards the locals to join the resistance.

== Prelude ==
Immediately before the uprising, the activity of the teacher Thanasis Genios from the village of Irakleia was noticed, who later became known as the commissar of the 11th division of ELAS under the name "Lasanis". In August 1941, he appeared as the leader of the "Odysseus Andruzos" partisan detachment, in Mount Kerdilia. While in Kilkis, another group appeared under the name "Athanasios Diakos". The "Odysseus Andruzos" detachment carried out sabotage attacks on police stations in the villages of Efkarpia and Mavrothalassa. A second major operation was carried out on September 22 1941, when a German convoy was attacked near the town of Lachanas. This was followed by a strong response from the German forces, due to which the detachments almost disbanded.

Their restoration took place almost in parallel with the occupation of this territory. Thus, at the initiative of Apostolos Tzanis, Paraskevas Drakos, Arampatzis and Lambros Mazarakis, the brothers Petros and Argyris Krokos, Petros Pastourmatzis, Gjorgji Bonchev, Nikolaidis, Atanas Karamurogi and others. The CPG Drama Committee soon started publishing and distributing the underground newspaper "Neos Dromos" in Greek, while leaflets were occasionally published in Macedonian Slavic as well.

On August 20, 1941, the speech of Petros Pastourmatzis (nom de guerre: Kitsos), was recorded at the first plenum of the Communist Party of Greece - District Committee for Drama region, where he informed that a headquarters was already formed which needed fighters who did not have families on their own. According to the testimony of one of the participants in this uprising, Gjorgji Bonchev, from the partisan headquarters on Mount Makros, an order was given to launch attacks on the municipality buildings, police stations and army objects in order to paralyze the occupier. The date set for the start of these actions was the night between September 28 and 29, 1941 at 23:00.

== Uprising ==
In this situation, a revolt broke out on 28 September 1941 under the guidance of the Communist Party of Greece. The uprising initially broke out in Doxato, where local Greeks attacked the police station and killed six or seven Bulgarian policemen. In another village, Choristi, a second group was recruited and moved to the mountains.

Parallel to the events in Doxato, the group from Prosotsani attacked the municipality with 9 fighters, the police division with 20 fighters, and the army garrison with the remaining 18 fighters. Next morning of September 29, in the town of Prosotsani, a people's government was declared. Gjorgji Bonchev addressed this rally in local Slavic, while the proclamation for the uprising in Greek was read by Antonios Nikolaidis.

== Reprisals ==
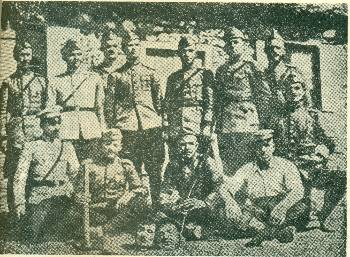
Bulgarian soldiers displaying their beheaded victims

The uprising was brutally suppressed by the Bulgarian occupation authorities. The following day, 29 September, all leaders were either killed in battle or in their attempt to escape to the German occupation zone. However, Bulgarian retaliations were not limited to the rebels. Bulgarian troops moved into Drama and the other rebellious cities to suppress the uprising and seized all men between 18 and 45. They were reported to have executed between 360 and 500 people in Drama alone. According to the Bulgarian military reports, up to 1,600 Greeks were killed in the uprising and in the weeks that followed - but Greek sources claim thousands of civilian casualties. Most of the members of the Communist Party of Greece were slaughtered by the Bulgarians, except for one member. In the villages of Doxato and Choristi a total of 485 men were executed оn September 29.

The main commanders and actors of these massacres are the Bulgarian police and military persons, Colonel Mihailov, Major Pecev, as well as the Commander of the Police, Stefan Magelanski.

The massacres precipitated an exodus of Greeks from the Bulgarian into the German occupation zone in Central Macedonia. Bulgarian reprisals continued after the suppression of the uprising, adding to the torrent of refugees. Villages were destroyed for sheltering “partisans” who were in fact only the survivors of villages previously destroyed. The terror and famine became so severe that the Athens government considered plans for evacuating the entire population to German-occupied Greece.

== Sources ==
- Apostolski, Mihailo and Stojanovski, Aleksandar (1979). A History of the Macedonian People. Translated by Reid, Graham W. Skopje, Yugoslavia: Macedonian Review Editions (Institute of National History). OCLC 1179512380.
- Bougarel, Xavier; Grandits, Hannes & Vulesica, Marija (2019). Local Dimensions of the Second World War in Southeastern Europe. Abingdon, UK: Routledge. ISBN 978-0-429-79877-1.
- Hoppe, Hans-Joachim (1986). "Bulgarian Nationalities Policy in Occupied Thrace and Aegean Macedonia". The Journal of Nationalism and Ethnicity. 14 (1–2): 89–100. doi:10.1080/00905998608408035. S2CID 129927316.
- Human Rights Watch (1994). The Macedonians of Greece (PDF) (Report). New York: Human Rights Watch.
- Ĭonchev, Dimitŭr (1993). Димитър Йончев, България и Беломорието (октомври 1940 – 9 септември 1944 г.) [Bulgaria and the Aegean (October 1940 – September 9, 1944] (in Bulgarian). Sofia: Military-Political Aspects, Dirum. OCLC 32465729.
- Kennedy, Robert M. (1989) [1954]. "Chapter 4: The Occupation Zones and Forces". German Antiguerrilla Operations in the Balkans, 1941–1944. 104–18. Washington, D.C.: Center of Military History, U.S. Army. OCLC 659474181. Archived from the original on December 13, 2007.
- Koliopulos, Iōannēs S.; Koliopoulos, Giannēs (1999). Plundered Loyalties: Axis Occupation and Civil Strife in Greek West Macedonia, 1941–1949. London: C. Hurst & Co. Publishers. ISBN 978-1-85065-381-3.
- Lemkin, Raphael (2008). Axis Rule in Occupied Europe. Clark, New Jersey: The Lawbook Exchange. ISBN 978-1-58477-901-8.
- Mazower, Mark (1995). Inside Hitler's Greece: The Experience of Occupation, 1941–44. Yale University Press. ISBN 0-300-08923-6.
- Mazower, Mark (2000). After the War was Over: Reconstructing the Family, Nation, and State in Greece, 1943–1960. Princeton University Press. ISBN 978-0-691-05842-9.
- Miller, Marshall Lee (1975). Bulgaria during the Second World War. Stanford, California: Stanford University Press. ISBN 978-0-8047-0870-8.
- US Army (1986) [1953]. The German Campaigns in the Balkans (Spring 1941): A Model of Crisis Planning. Department of the Army Pamphlet No. 20–260. Washington, D.C.: United States Army Center of Military History. OCLC 16940402. CMH Pub 104-4. Archived from the original on 2009-06-19.
- Woodhouse, Christopher Montague (2002). The struggle for Greece, 1941–1949. C. Hurst & Co. Publishers. ISBN 1-85065-492-1.
