= Vathylakkos, Drama =

Vathylakkos Βαθύλακκος
- Settlement
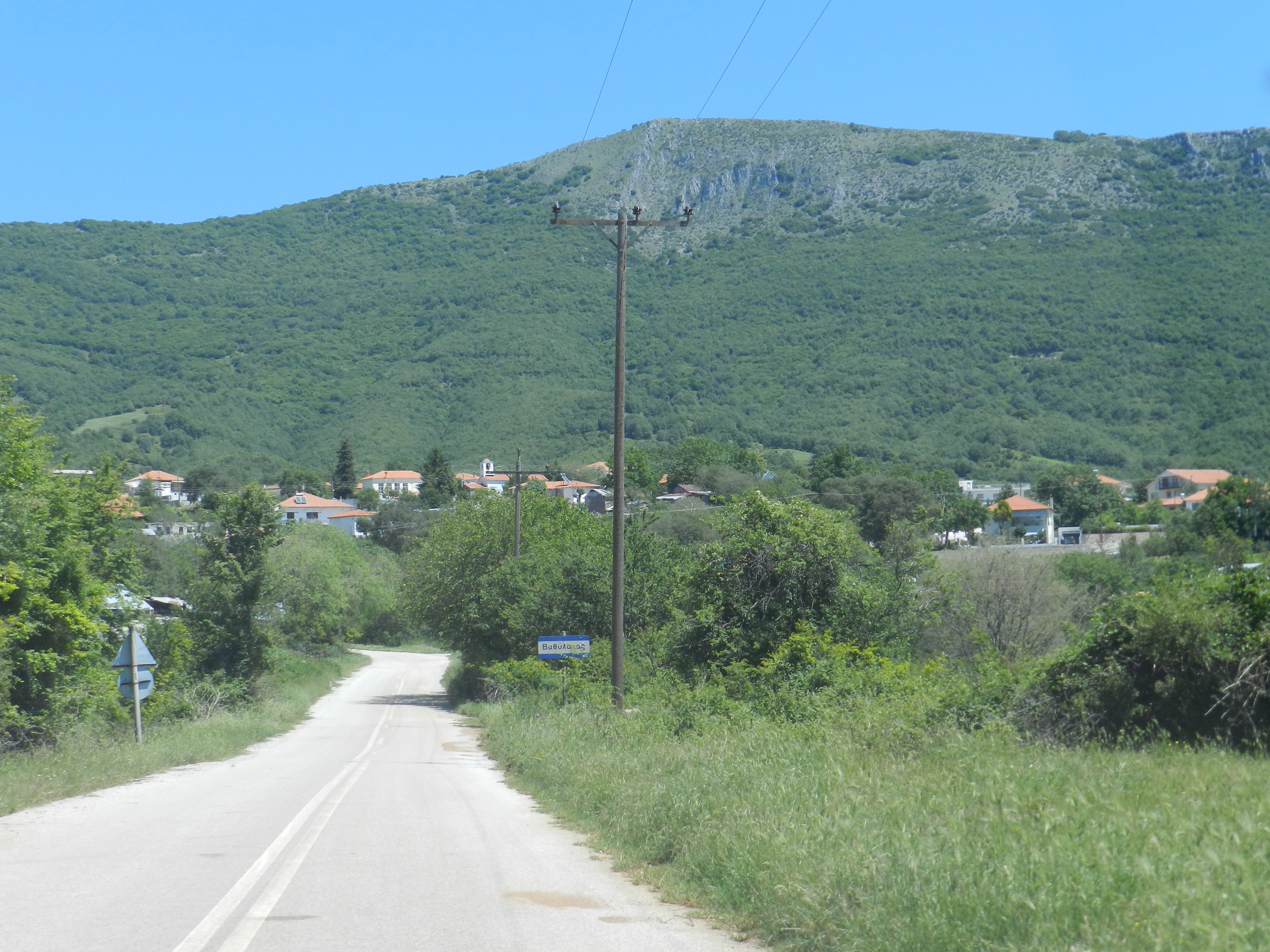
- Vathylakkos

- Location within Greece
- Coordinates: 41°13′55″N 24°09′54″E
- Country: Greece
- Administrative region: East Macedonia and Thrace
- Regional unit: Drama
- Municipality: Drama
- Municipal unit: Drama
- Community: Monastiraki
- Elevation: 500 m (1,600 ft)

Population (2021)
  - Total: 42
- Time zone: UTC+2 (EET)
  - Summer (DST): UTC+3 (EEST)

Vathylakkos (Greek: Βαθύλακκος 'deep ditch'), Bulgarian: Ко̀вица, Ко̀вища, Turkish: Kovitsa) is a village in the Drama regional unit, Eastern Macedonia and Thrace region, northern Greece. It was known as Kovitsa (Greek: Κόβιτσα) in Greek until 1927. Its population is 42 (2021).

The village is part of the community of Monastiraki within the municipality of Drama.

== Geography ==
Village is situated in the Falakro mountains, is about 500 metres above the sea level and about 10 kilometers north Drama. The region has abundant marble deposits.

== Climate ==
The climate is warm and temperate, with an annual average temperature of 12.0 °C.. There is rainfall throughout the year, with average annual rainfall of 559 mm.. Its climate is classified as Cfa in the Köppen-Geiger system.

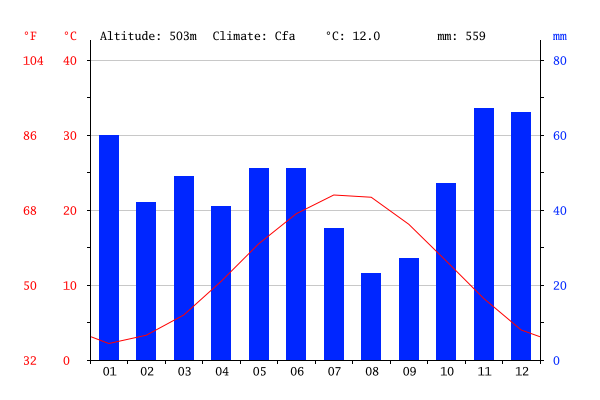
Climate-graph in Vatylakkos

The driest month is August, with 23 mm of rainfall. In November, the precipitation reaches its peak, with an average of 67 mm.

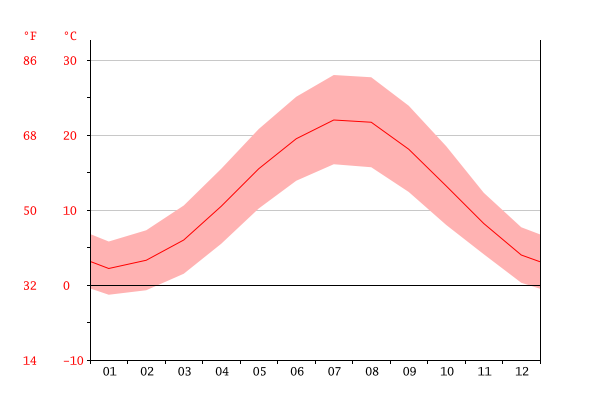
Temperature-graph in Vathylakkos

The warmest month of the year is July, with an average temperature of 22.0 °C. At 2.2 °C on average, January is the coldest month of the year.

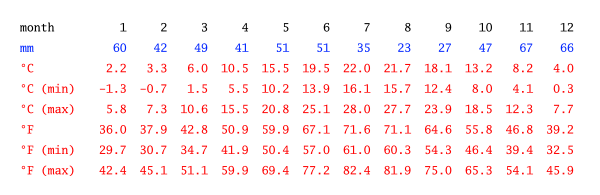
Climate-table in Vathylakkos

The difference in precipitation between the driest month and the wettest month is 44 mm. The variation in annual temperature is around 19.8 °C.

== History ==
=== Ottoman and Turkish era ===
In late 14th century, commander Çandarlı Halil Pasha the Elder who was the first Grand Vizier of Murad I's reign joined the region as Kavala and Selanik in the Ottoman lands.

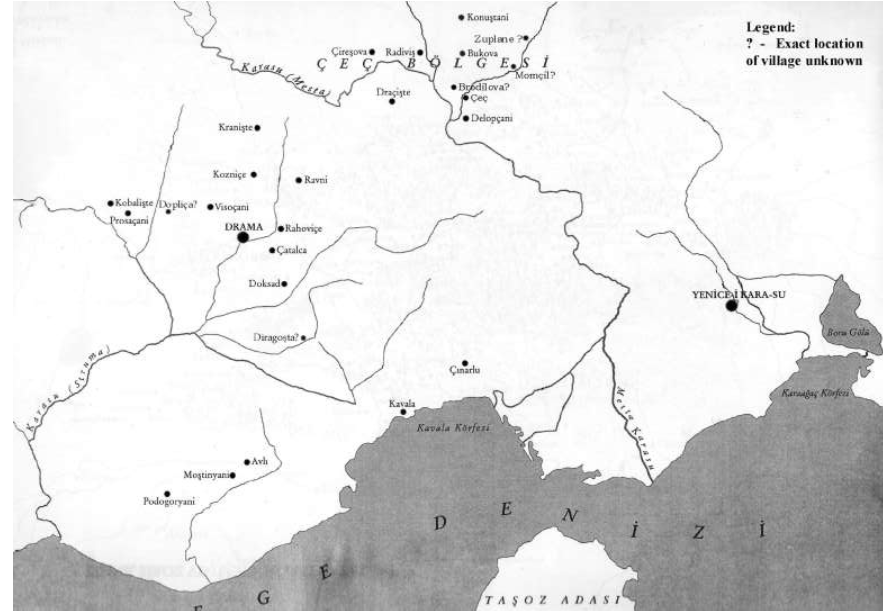
Background of map and location of some villages taken from 167 numaralı Muhasebe-iVilayet-i Rum-ili Defteri (937/1530), T.C. Başbakanlık Devlet Arşivleri Müdürlüğü Osmanlı ArşiviDaire Başkanlığı, Vol.1, Ankara, 2001, p.139.

In early period of Ottoman archives according to Ottoman tax registers "Muhasebe-i Vilayet-i Rum İli Defteri" dated 1530 which was not a census, for various reasons, a big amount of the population (women, children, military) is out of record the region known as Kozniçe. Kozniçe has 1 Muslim hane (household) and 2 mücerred (single male) also 25 hane and 6 mücerred is Gebran (Christian) taxpayers. In the same way, it is the one of 30 mixed villages with Muslim and non-Muslims which is total 53 village in Drama rural region.

In later period of Ottoman archives the village known as Kuyçe then, in final period of Ottoman archives and in Turkish Republic archives the village known as Koyca.

After the first Balkan war in 1913 village remains within the borders of Bulgarian but after the second Balkan war Greece gain the territory .

=== Early 20th century ===
According to the Greek authorities, population of the village was 589 people in 1913 census data. The population had increased to 607 people in 1920 the census. According to conditions in that time growth of population is one of the rare villages. It is the reason of Muslim population who live together with non-Muslim population in other villages to flee to in higher safe places from the pressures of the gangs.

According to data of Greek agriculture and forestry authorities in 1914, forest land of village was 7000 acres and cultivated land remarked only 1 acre of agricultural data. Product yields were recorded only 50 kg in the book. It is a mountain village and livelihood is based on livestock.

=== Population exchange ===
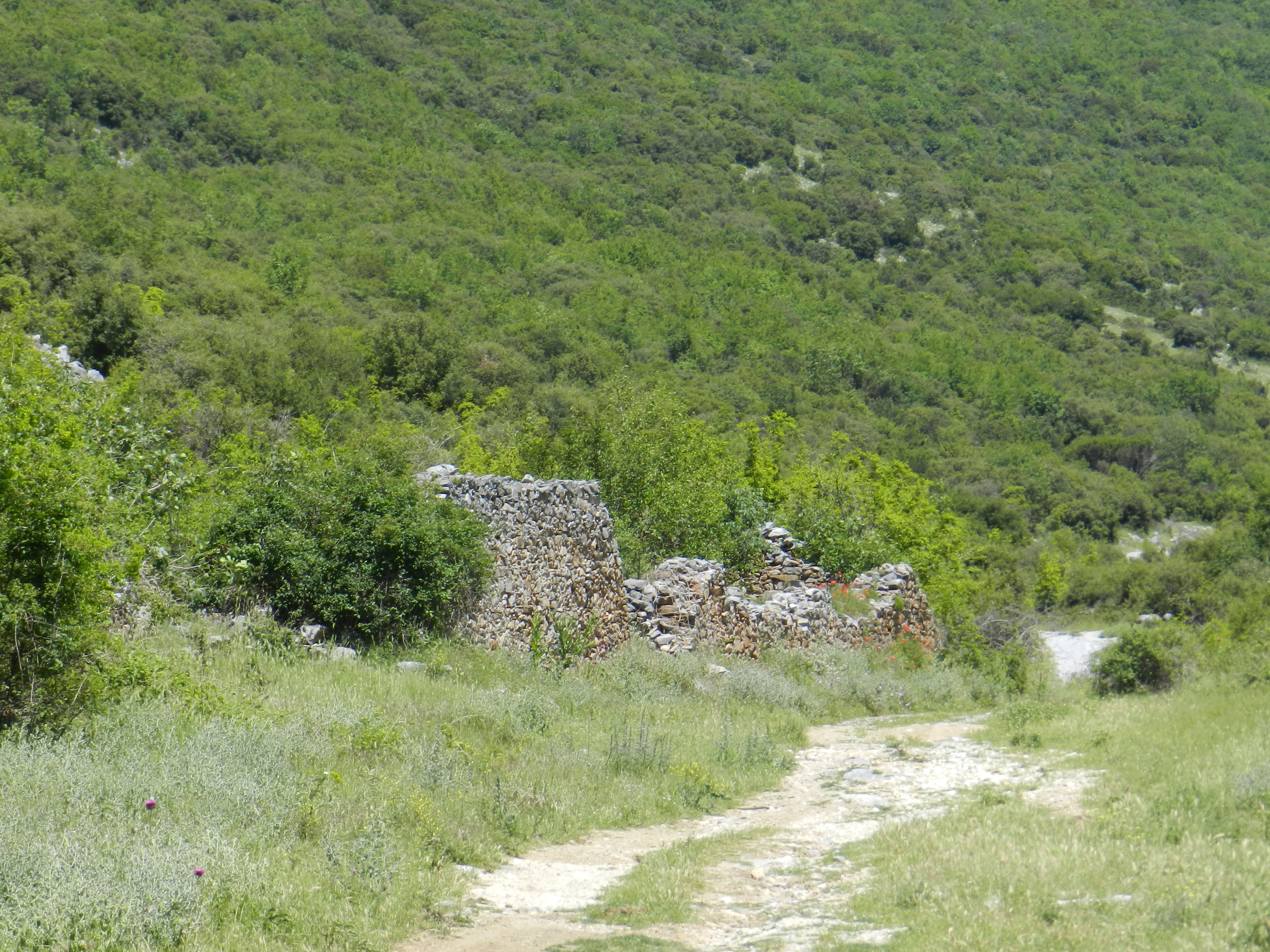
Turkish homes ruins in Vathylakkos

Because of Treaty of Lausanne village was included the Greco-Turkish population exchange of 1923. All people in the Kovitsa started the journey from the Drama train station to Turkey in summer of 1923.

According to statistics Vasil Kanchov ("Macedonia Ethnography and Statistics") Kovitsa has 410 inhabitants, all Turks in 1900. When its most of Muslim inhabitants left and settled in Kayabaşı and Mahmut Şevket Paşa village in Istanbul, and also others Halitpaşa and Yağcılar in Akhisar in Manisa, Kadıköy in Keşan and some villages of Orhangazi, İznik in Bursa, hence were replaced by entirely Greek 41 refugee families and 131 residents from Turkey. New inhabitants of Kayabaşı lived together with Orthodox inhibitans of Kayabaşı for a while and most of old inhabitants settled in Kailaria region in Greece.

=== World War II ===
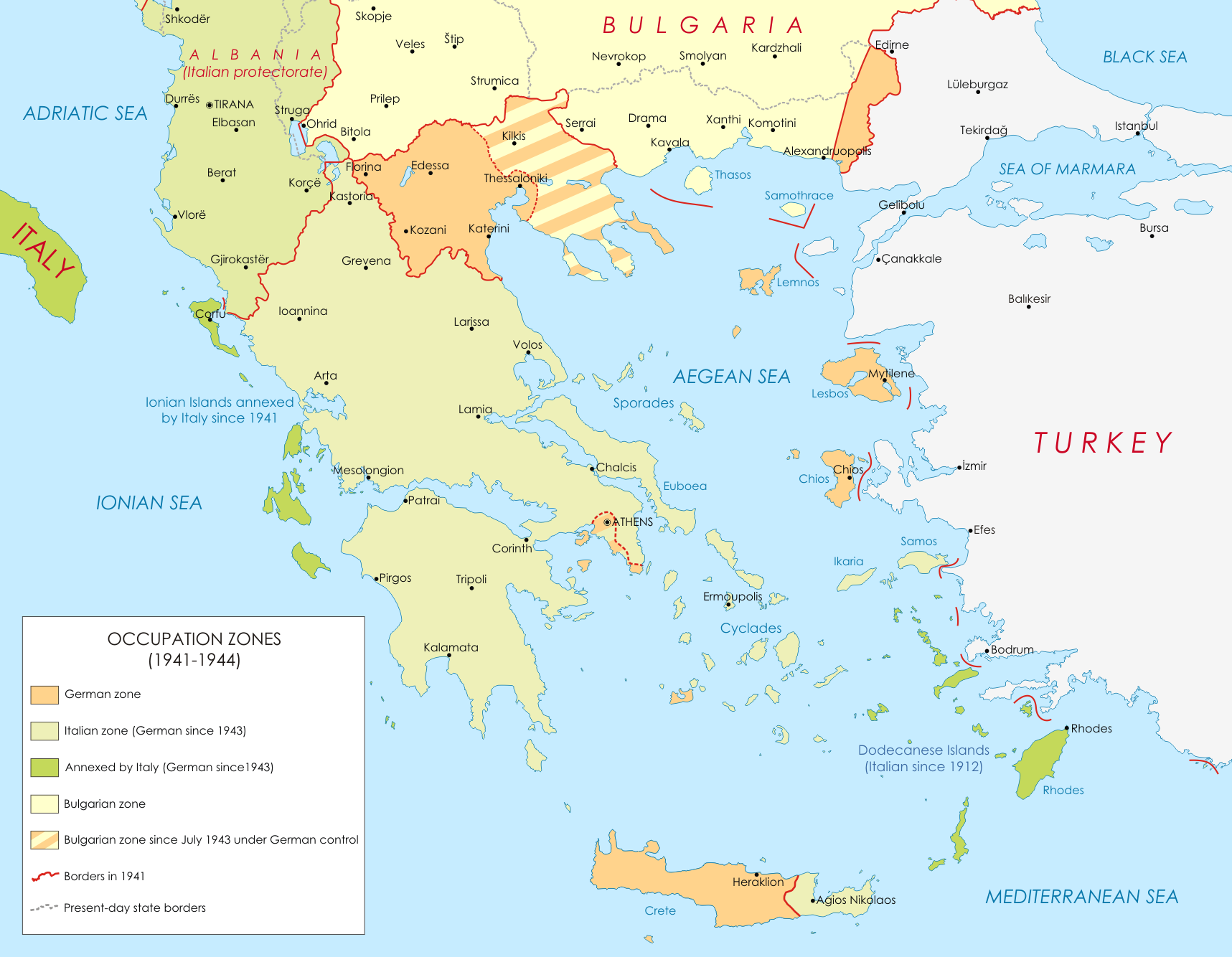
Map showing the three occupation zones.

During the World War II the region was occupied by Bulgarian Army between 1941 and 1944 as most of Thrace.

=== 21st century ===
During the former administrative division of Greece ("Kapodistrias" project) and until 2010, Vathylakkos belonged to Monastiraki Local District, the former municipality of Drama the prefecture of Drama.

== Other ==
There is a church which converted some part of an old mosque, and only one classroom inactive school. Although there is no business in the village, public transportation facilities is limited. Most of the villagers migrated abroad because of lack of business facilities as a result of there is small number of young people in the village.

== Gallery ==
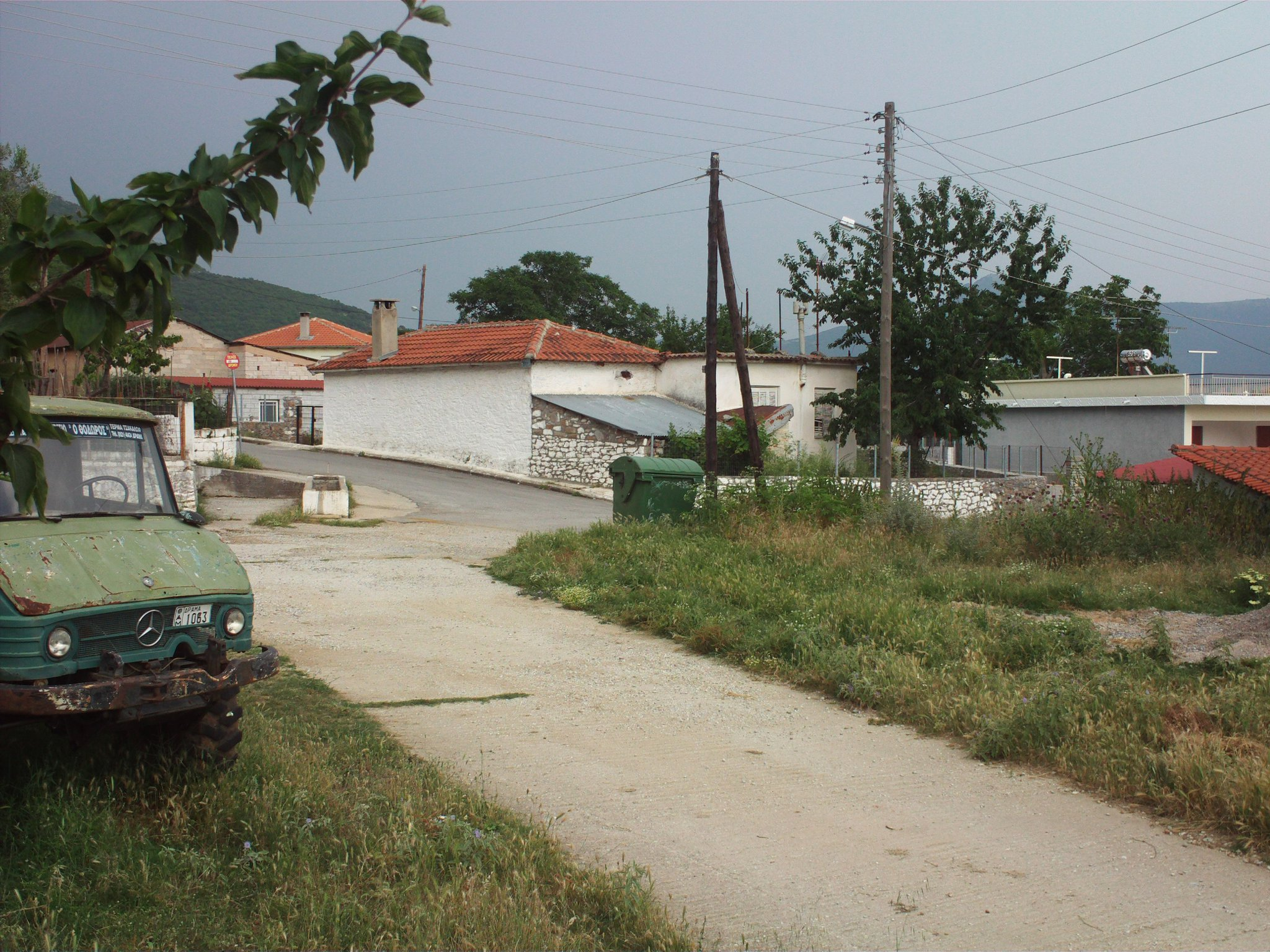
Vathylakkos

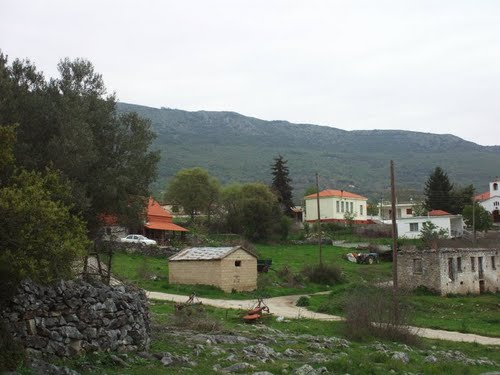
View of East side from Vathylakkos in Drama

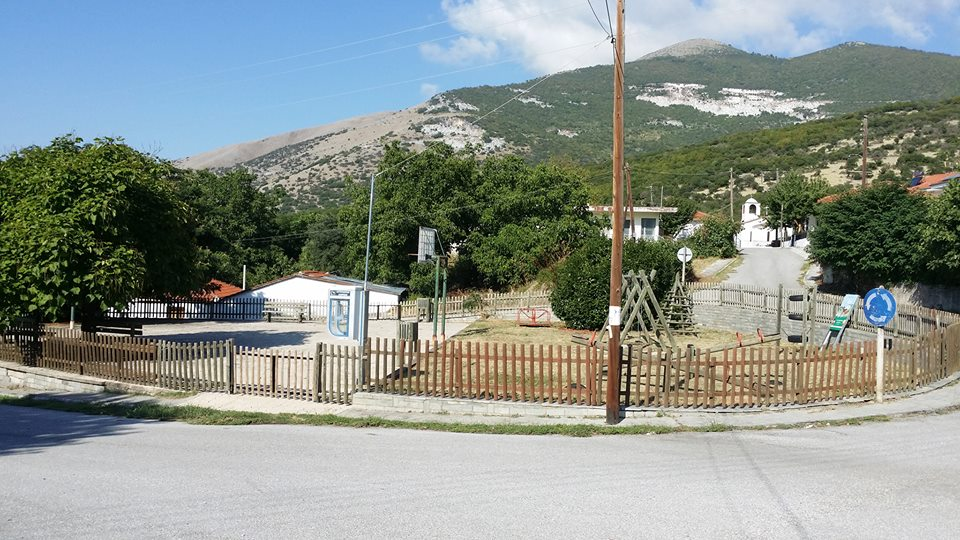
Square of Vathylakkos

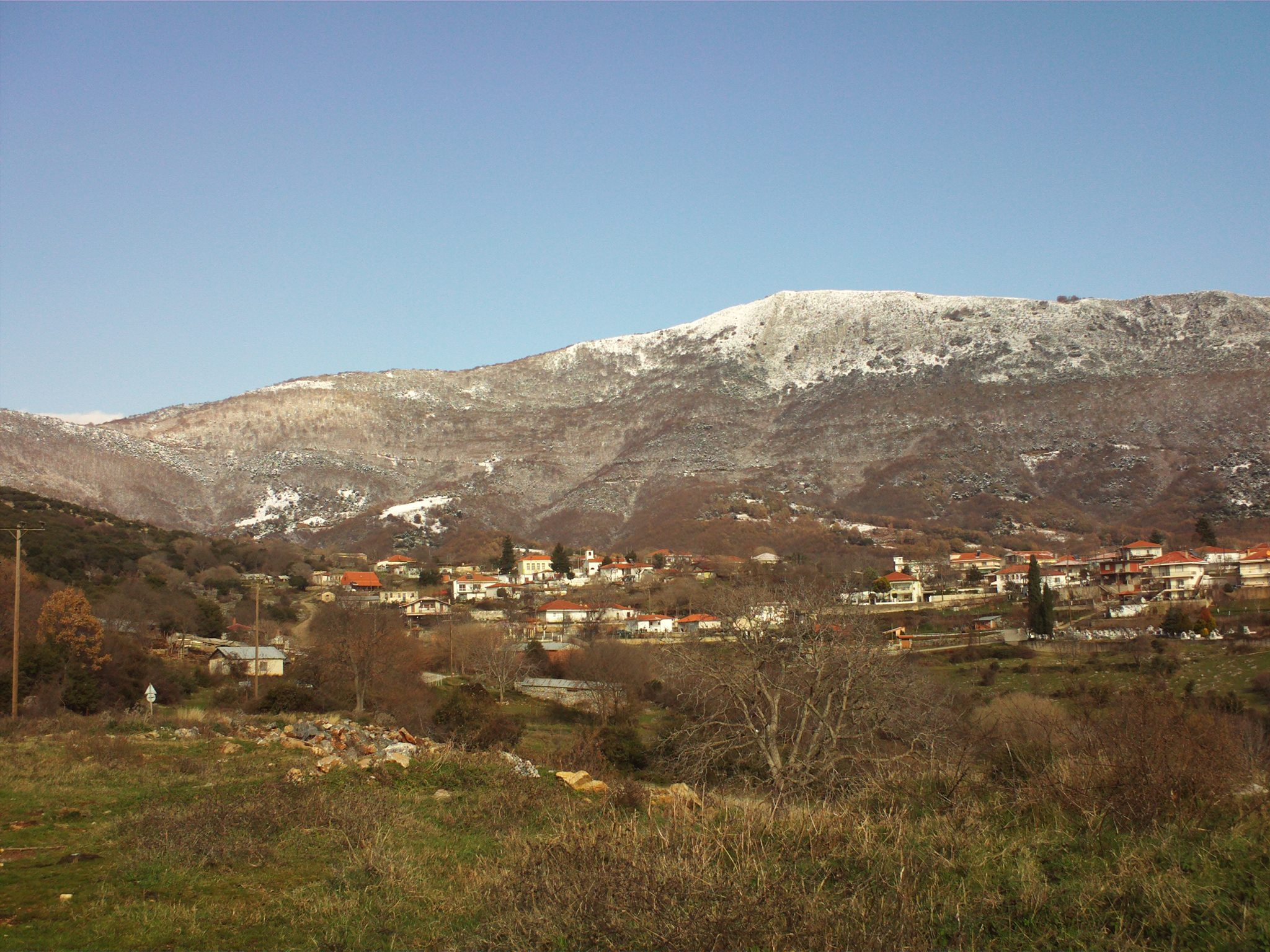
Vathylakkos in winter

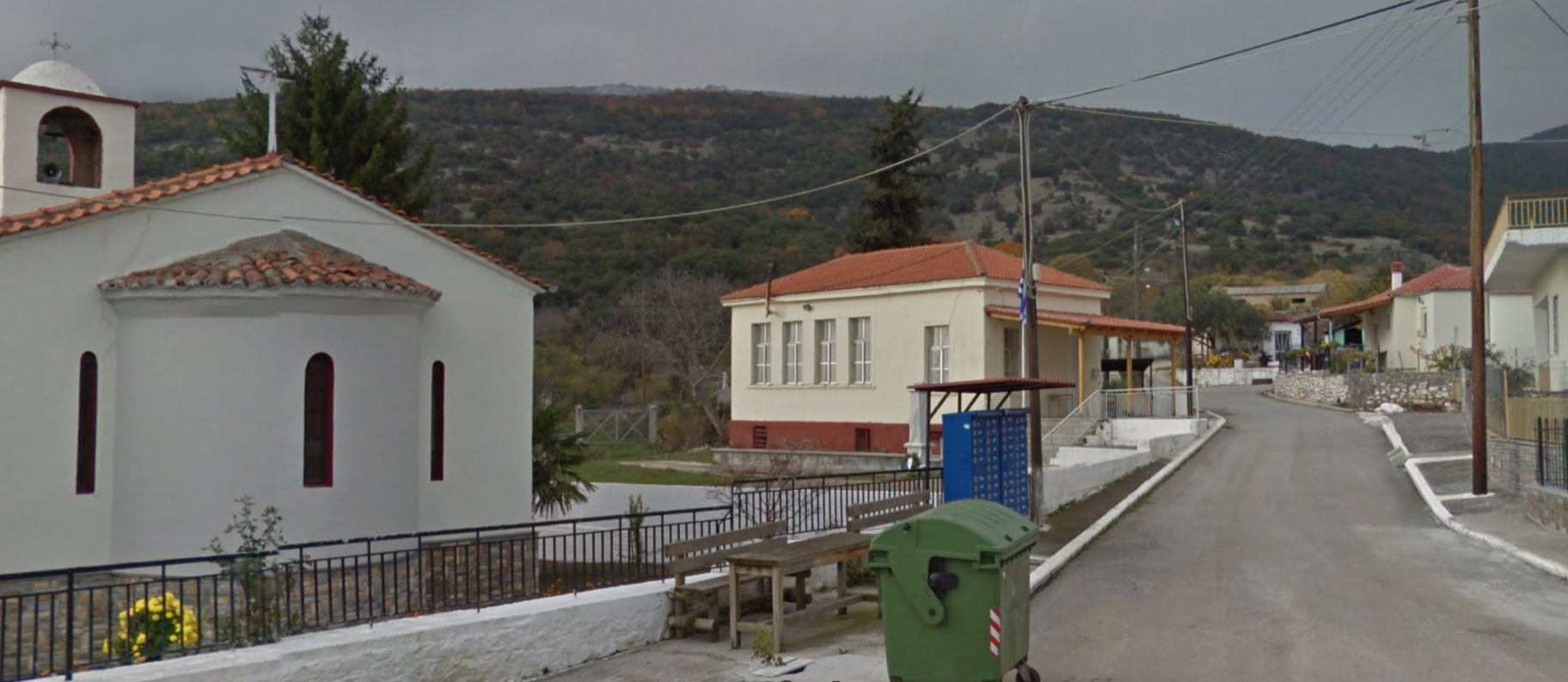
Inactive school of Vathylakkos

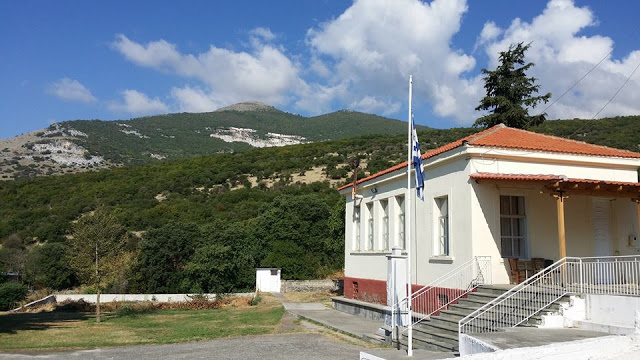
School of Vathylakkos

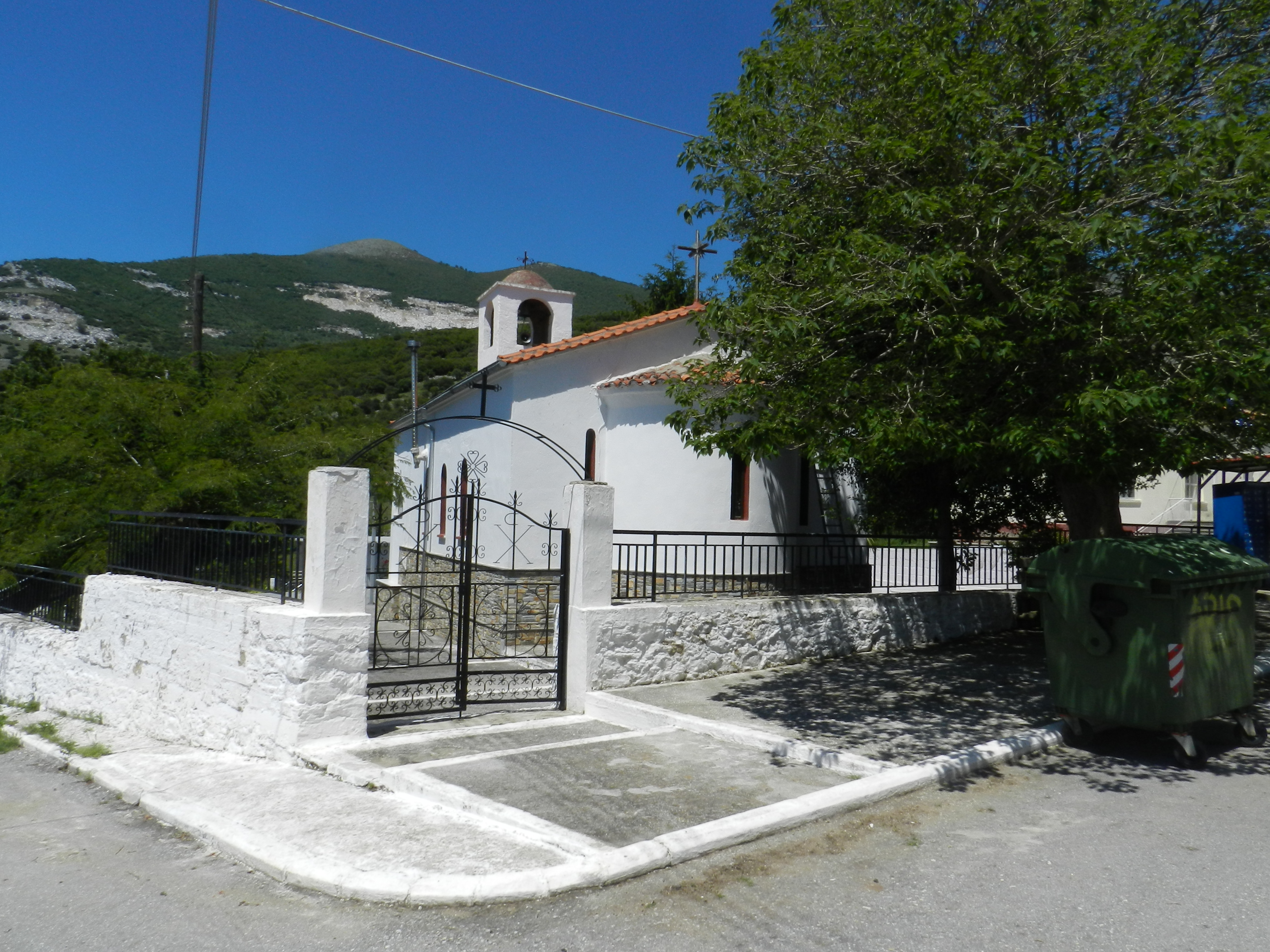
Assumption of Mary Orthodox Church in Vathylakkos Drama

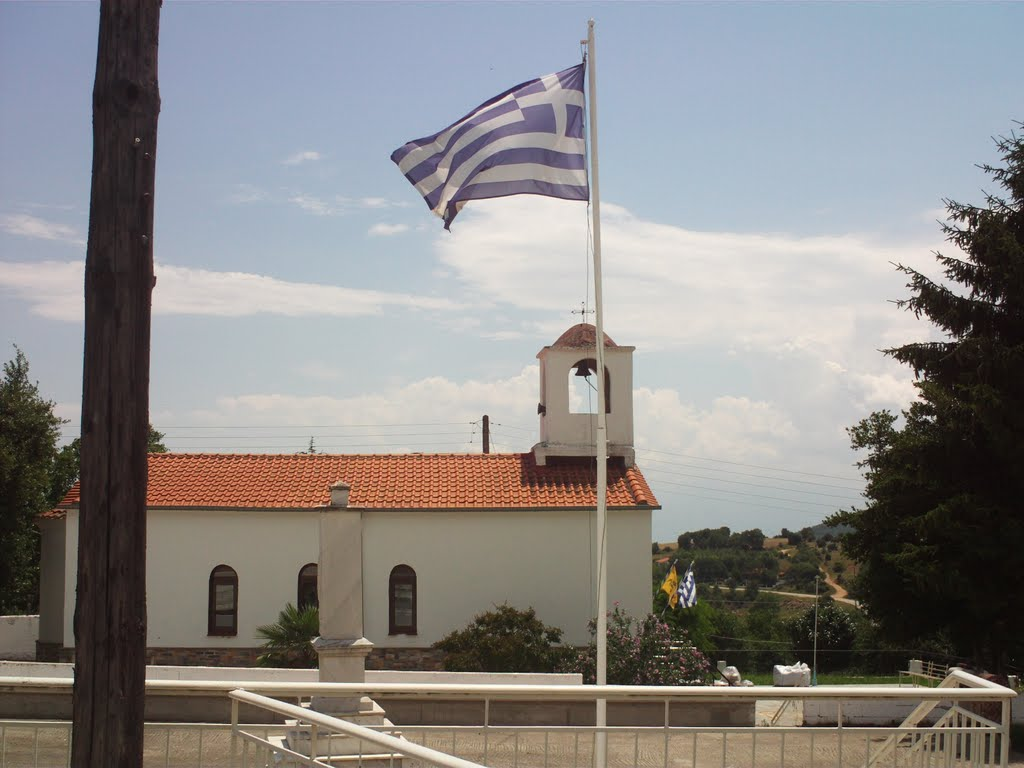
Church of Vathylakkos

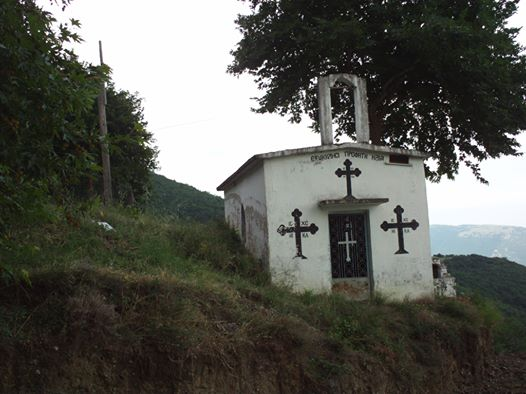
Chapel

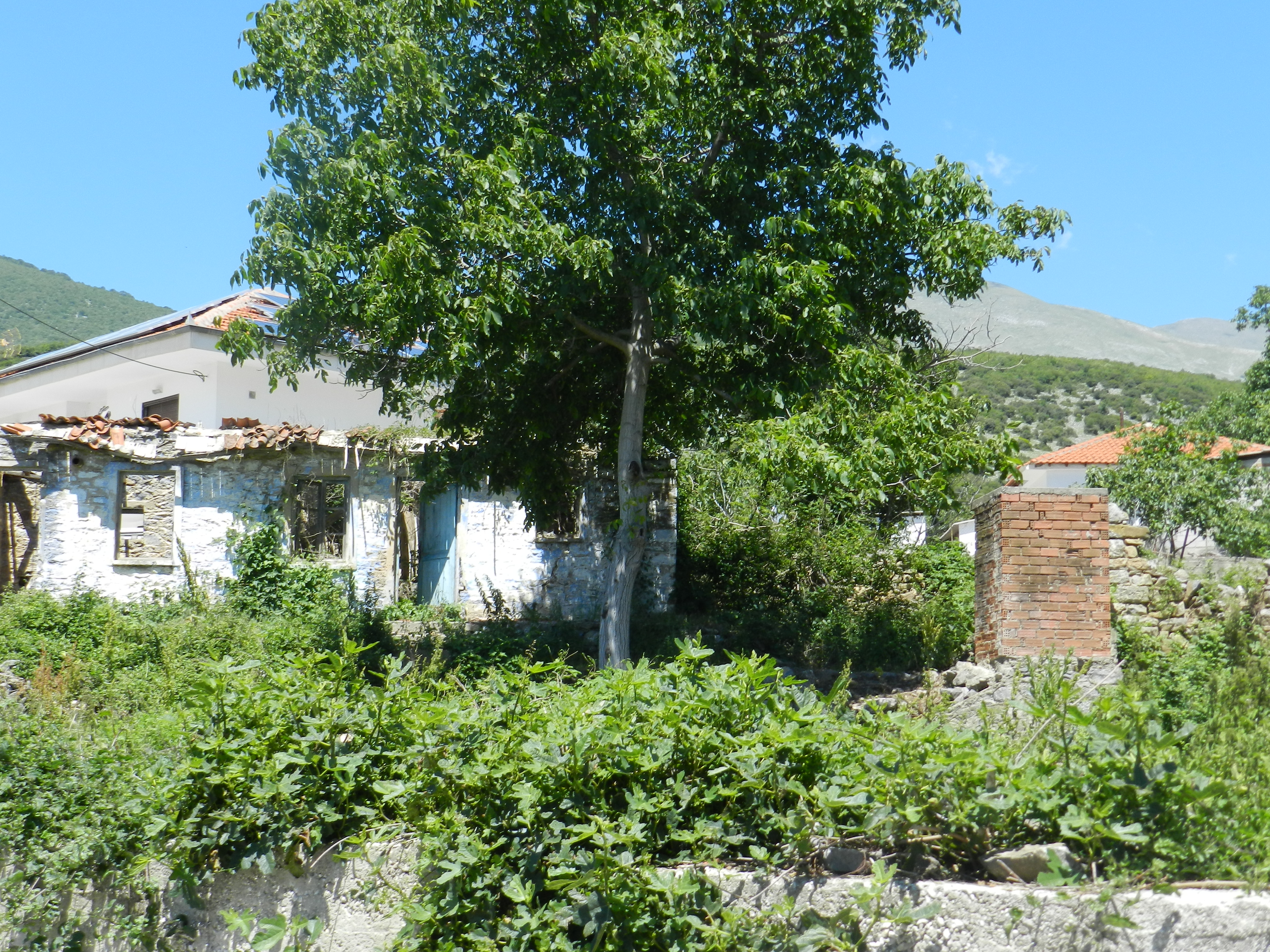
Ruins from period of occupation during World War ıı

== See also ==
- List of former toponyms in Drama Prefecture
