= Kyrgia =

Kyrgia Κύργια
- Community
- Location within Greece
- Coordinates: 41°06′N 24°17′E
- Country: Greece
- Administrative region: East Macedonia and Thrace
- Regional unit: Drama
- Municipality: Doxato
- Municipal unit: Doxato

Population (2021)
  - Community: 1,535
- Time zone: UTC+2 (EET)
  - Summer (DST): UTC+3 (EEST)

Kyrgia (Greek: Κύργια, also Κύρια - Kyria, before 1953: Οργαντζή - Organtzi) is a village and a community in the municipality of Doxato, Drama regional unit, northern Greece. The community consists of the following villages:

Village	Population (2011 census)
Evrypedo	135
Kyrgia	1,330
Vathychori	208
Vathyspilo	235
Ypsilo	50

The former Turkish name of Ypsilo was Kasapli or Khasapli. The former Turkish name of Vathychori was Arapli.
