= Ftelia, Drama =

Ftelia Φτελιά
- Community
- Location within Greece
- Coordinates: 41°04′55″N 24°11′24″E
- Country: Greece
- Administrative region: East Macedonia and Thrace
- Regional unit: Drama
- Municipality: Doxato
- Municipal unit: Kalampaki

Population (2021)
  - Community: 612
- Time zone: UTC+2 (EET)
  - Summer (DST): UTC+3 (EEST)

Ftelia is a village in the Drama regional unit, in northeastern Greece. Its population is 612 (2021 census). Ftelia means "elm tree" in Greek. The village is situated 9 km to the south of the city of Drama in Macedonia, Greece. It is part of the municipal unit of Kalampaki. Many of the village's residents are descendants of Greeks who fled from the Northern Thrace region of Bulgaria during the Balkan Wars.

Ftelia has a kindergarten. It also has a football team, "Aris Ftelias", which competes in the prefecture of Drama amateur division.
