= Kelli, Drama =

Coordinates: 41°11′N 24°19′E

Kelli (Greek: Κελλή) is a former village in the Drama regional unit, Greece.
