= Paliampela, Drama =

Village in Greece

Paliampela is a village in the Paranesti Municipality within the Drama Regional Unit, in the area of Eastern Macedonia and Thrace, Greece.

== Geography and Location ==
The village is located 37 kilometers east of the city of Drama and 19 kilometers southwest of the municipal center, Paranesti. The village is at an altitude of 250 meters.

== History ==
In the 19th century, the village was known as Hasan Balar, and was located within the Drama Kaza, under the jurisdiction of the Ottoman Empire.

Following the end of the Balkan Wars, the village became part of Greece. After the Treaty of Lausanne was signed in 1923 between Turkey and Greece, Greek refugees from Anatolia settled in the village, while the Muslim population left, as per the population exchange.

In 1927, the village was renamed as Paliampela.

== Demographics ==
By 1928, the village had been populated by 112 refugees from Turkey. In 1928, the village had 112 residents, and by 1940, the population had grown to 186 residents. According to the census of 1951, there were 145 residents, while in 1961, the population was 154. In 1971, the village had 81 residents, dropping to 64 in 1981, and rising to 95 in 1991. The village has a population of 48 according to the 2011 census.
