= Potamoi, Drama =

Village in Eastern Macedonia, Greece

Potamoi Ποταμοί
- Community
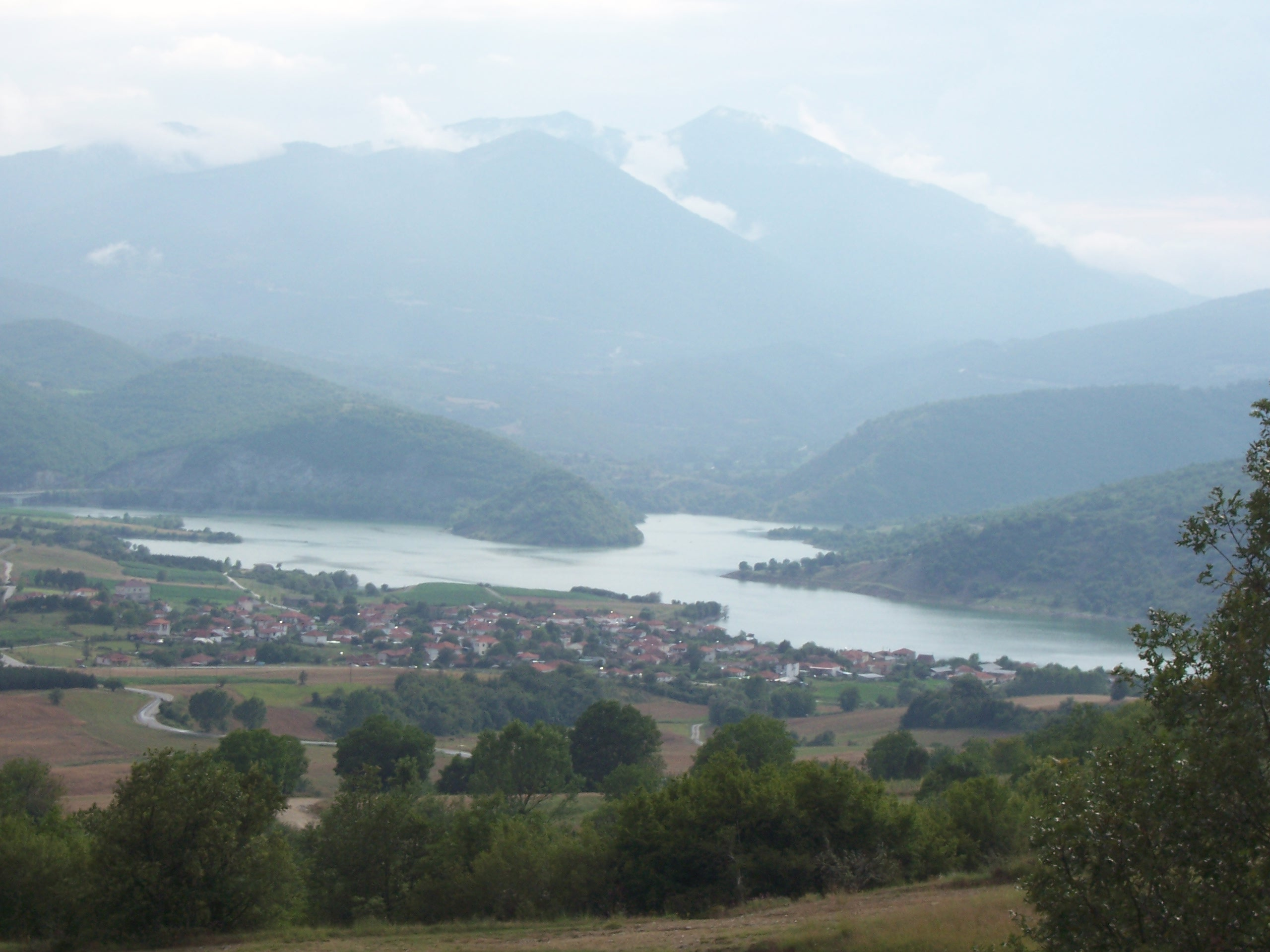
- The village of Potamoi

- Location within Greece
- Coordinates: 41°23′N 24°06′E
- Country: Greece
- Administrative region: East Macedonia and Thrace
- Regional unit: Drama
- Municipality: Kato Nevrokopi
- Elevation: 445 m (1,460 ft)

Population (2021)
  - Community: 161
- Time zone: UTC+2 (EET)
  - Summer (DST): UTC+3 (EEST)
- Postal code: 66033
- Area code: 2523
- Vehicle registration: ΡΜ

Potamoi (Greek: Ποταμοί), until 1927 known as Borovo (Greek: Μπόροβο, Bulgarian: Борово), is a village in the Drama regional unit, Greece. It is situated in the Chech region, at the mouth of the river Dospat on the left shore of the river Nestos.

== History ==
Human habitation in the area of the village stretches back to prehistory. In 1967 many artifacts from different epochs were found near the village with some dated to the Bronze Age. Further 860 silver coins from Philip II of Macedon have been excavated from the environs of the village.

The village is first mentioned as Borovo in an Ottoman registry from the latter 15th/early 16th century, with 153 registered male inhabitants. The village has also been mentioned (as Borova) by the Austrian geologist Ami Boué, who visited the Balkans between 1836-1838. He notes that the way from Dospat to Kato Nevrokopi goes through Borova. He further notes that the village has been visited earlier by the Frenchman Vikenel.

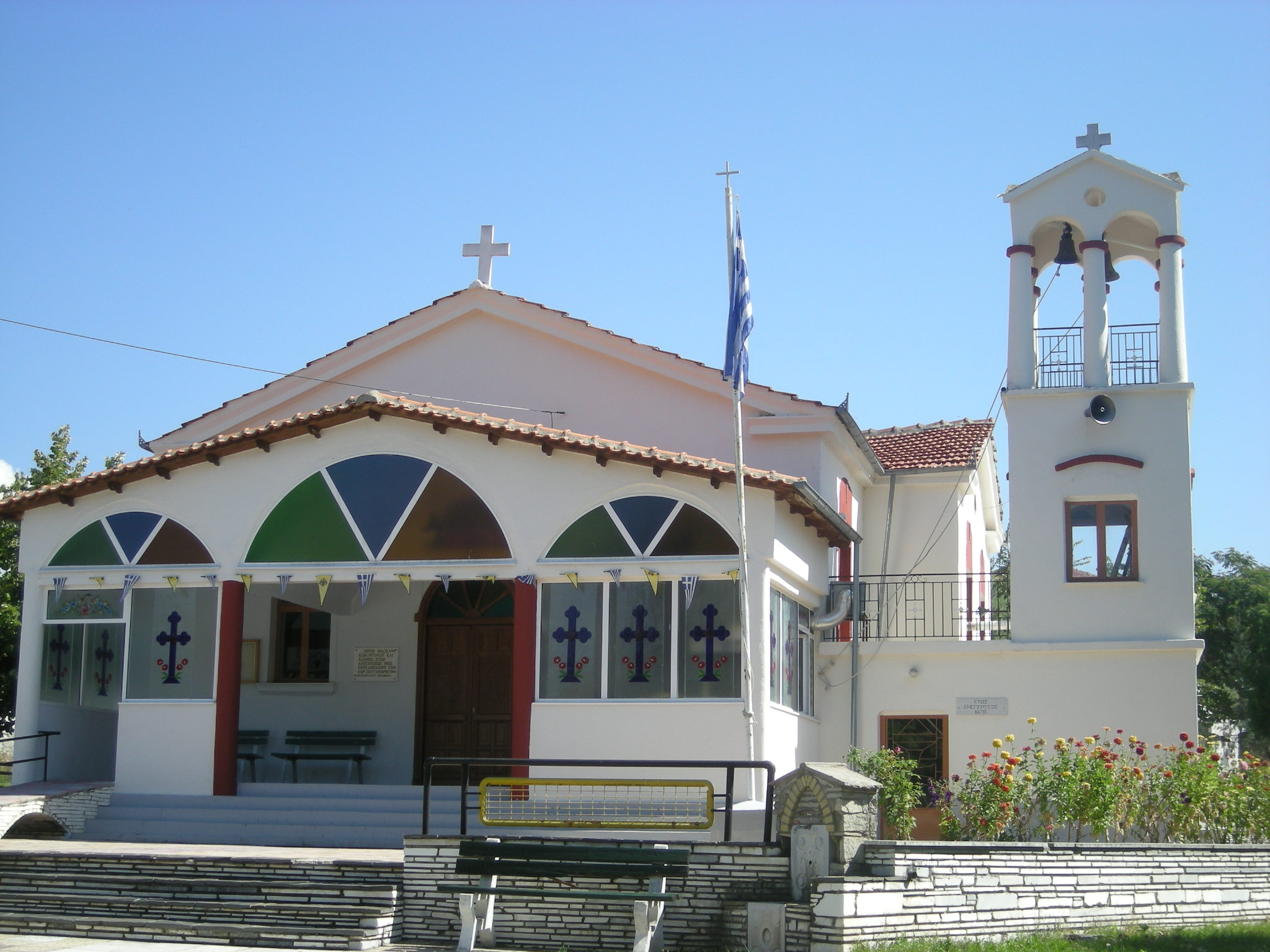
The church of Potamoi

According to the Bulgarian ethnographer and politician Vasil Kanchov, as of the 19th century the village of Borovo was a Muslim-populated village with 500 Bulgarian Muslims (Pomaks), 250 Turks and 140 houses. In another statistic from 1873 the village of Borovo is mentioned as a Pomak village with 280 male Pomaks and 110 households. According to a Greek statistic from 1913, 1045 inhabitants lived in Borovo (Μπόροβον).

Kanchov writes that in 1900 the village was ruled by a mudur with no power outside of it. He also notes the existence of two mosques and a maktab.

In 1923 the Pomaks and the Turks were expelled from the village according to the Treaty of Lausanne. Subsequently Greek refugees from Turkey were settled in the village. In 1928 the number of the refugees settled in Borovo had reached 384 and the number of the Greek families 113. In 1927 the name of the village was changed from Borovo (Μπόροβο) to Potami (Ποταμοί).

During World War II and after the Bulgarian coup d'état of 1944, a group of Pomak soldiers led by Faik Gaziev from the Bulgarian village of Ablanitsa sponsored by the United States and Greece carried out sabotage and reconnaissance missions against the Communists regime in Bulgaria from the village of Potamoi.

According to Greek data the population of Potamoi has changed as follows: 1920 - 650 inhabitants, 1928 - 438 inhabitants, 1940 - 873 inhabitants, 1951 - 760 inhabitants, 1961 - 751 inhabitants, 1971 - 537 inhabitants, 1981 - 397 inhabitants, 1991 - 377 inhabitants, 2001 - 413 inhabitants, 2011 - 323 inhabitants.
