= Leimon =

Town of ancient Caria, inhabited in Roman times

Coordinates: 37°55′35″N 28°06′36″E

Leimon (Ancient Greek: Λειμών; meaning "Meadow") was a town of ancient Caria, inhabited during Roman times.

The people of Nysa and surrounding areas went there to celebrate religious festivals. It was associated with nearby sacred places connected to the gods Pluto and Persephone, including an underground passage that was believed to extend toward Acharaca. It was also mentioned in poetry as an "Asian meadow". Nearby, there were also a hero-sanctuary of Cayster and a certain Asius.

Its site is located near Kızılkaya in Asiatic Turkey.
