= Sidironero =

Sidironero Σιδηρόνερο
- Municipal unit
- Location within the regional unit

- Location within Greece
- Coordinates: 41°22′N 24°14′E
- Country: Greece
- Administrative region: East Macedonia and Thrace
- Regional unit: Drama
- Municipality: Drama

Area
  - Municipal unit: 351.3 km^{2} (135.6 sq mi)

Population (2021)
  - Municipal unit: 239
  - Municipal unit density: 0.680/km^{2} (1.76/sq mi)
  - Community: 198
- Time zone: UTC+2 (EET)
  - Summer (DST): UTC+3 (EEST)
- Vehicle registration: ΡΜ

Sidironero (Greek: Σιδηρόνερο, before 1927: Οσενίτσα - Osenitsa, Bulgarian: Осеница, Osenitsa) is a village and a former community in the Drama regional unit, East Macedonia and Thrace, Greece. It has traditionally had a Bulgarian Muslim, or Pomak citizenry, like the rest of the Chech geographic region. Since the 2011 local government reform it is part of the municipality Drama, of which it is a municipal unit. It lies in the Rhodope Mountains region along the Bulgarian border in the northern part of the Drama regional unit between Kato Nevrokopi and Paranesti. Its land area is 351.273 km^{2} (135.627 sq mi).

The municipal unit is subdivided into two local communities (constituent villages listed in brackets):

- Sidironero (Kallikarpo, Oropedio, Pappades, Sidironero)
- Skaloti

The population of the municipal unit was 239 inhabitants, of which 198 in the community of Sidironero, at the 2021 census.
