= Kalamon, Drama =

Kalamon Καλαμών
- Community
- Location within Greece
- Coordinates: 41°1′N 24°13′E
- Country: Greece
- Administrative region: East Macedonia and Thrace
- Regional unit: Drama
- Municipality: Doxato
- Municipal unit: Kalampaki

Population (2021)
  - Community: 509
- Time zone: UTC+2 (EET)
  - Summer (DST): UTC+3 (EEST)

Kalamon or Kalamonas (Greek: Καλαμών or Καλαμώνας), until the 1920s known as Bosinos (Μποσινός, Bulgarian: Бошинос, romanized: Boshinos) is a village in Kalampaki municipality, Drama regional unit, Greece. At the 2021 census, the population of the village was 509.
