= Mikropoli =

Mikropoli Μικρόπολη
- Community
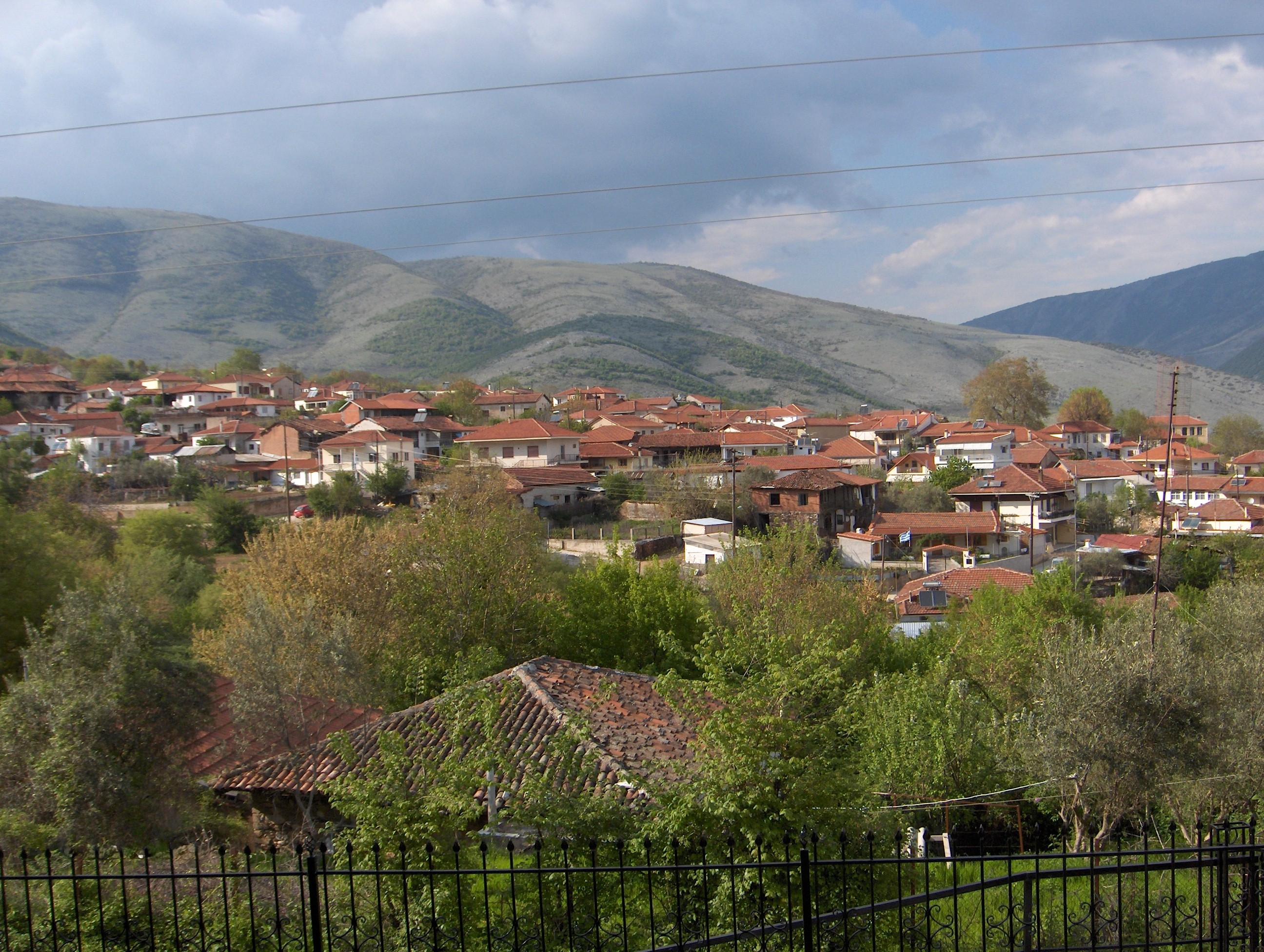

- Location within Greece
- Coordinates: 41°11′N 23°49′E
- Country: Greece
- Administrative region: Eastern Macedonia and Thrace
- Regional unit: Drama
- Municipality: Prosotsani
- Municipal unit: Prosotsani
- Elevation: 260 m (850 ft)

Population (2021)
  - Community: 618
- Time zone: UTC+2 (EET)
  - Summer (DST): UTC+3 (EEST)

Mikropoli (Greek: Μικρόπολη) is a village in the Drama regional unit. It belongs to the Prosotsani municipality and according to the 2021 census it has a population of 618 residents.

== History ==
A Latin inscription which was found in the village and was published in 1876 by L. Heuzey and H. Daumet, states that in this area there must have existed a Roman vicus which belonged to the colony of Philippi.

Latin
SERVAEVSEVIICIIVSIVLIISL

ATIARIA.ACTE.MARITO,ETSIBI.F.C.

INEA.ARCA.ALIVMQVIPOSVERIT.QQSSS

DABIT.R.P.*D

Loose translation
Servaeus Eutychos who died 50 years old lies here.

Ariaria Acte built this monument for this man

and whoever puts in the sarcophagus a body other than that of the aforementioned man,

must pay to the colony 500 denarii each year.

Mikropolis in 1885 had in total 2000 residents, of which 50 were Greeks, 750 Muslims and 1200 Slavic speakers, some affiliated with the Patriarchate and some with the Exarchate. In 1910 the village is also named Karlikova with 1900 residents, 900 Greeks and 1000 Muslims.
