= Kalos Agros =

Town of ancient Thrace

Coordinates: 41°09′19″N 29°02′12″E

Kalos Agros was a town of ancient Thrace, inhabited during Roman times. Its site situated near Büyükdere in European Turkey.
