= Sitagroi =

Village in Eastern Macedonia, Greece

Sitagroi Σιταγροί
- Municipal unit
- Location within the regional unit

- Location within Greece
- Coordinates: 41°07′N 24°02′E
- Country: Greece
- Administrative region: East Macedonia and Thrace
- Regional unit: Drama
- Municipality: Prosotsani

Area
  - Municipal unit: 62.9 km^{2} (24.3 sq mi)

Population (2021)
  - Municipal unit: 3,240
  - Municipal unit density: 51.5/km^{2} (133/sq mi)
  - Community: 535
- Time zone: UTC+2 (EET)
  - Summer (DST): UTC+3 (EEST)
- Vehicle registration: ΡΜ

Sitagroi (Greek: Σιταγροί) is a village and a former municipality in the Drama regional unit, East Macedonia and Thrace, Greece. Since the 2011 local government reform, it is part of the municipality Prosotsani, of which it is a municipal unit. The municipal unit has an area of 62.890 km^{2}. The population was 3,240 in 2021. The seat of the municipality was in Fotolivos.

It is also the location of an important archaeological site from the late Neolithic and early Bronze Age.

== Bibliography ==
- Ernestine S. Elster and Colin Renfrew (eds), Prehistoric Sitagroi: excavations in northeast Greece, 1968–1970. Vol. 2, The final report. Los Angeles, CA : Cotsen Institute of Archaeology, University of California, Los Angeles, 2003. Monumenta archaeologica 20.
- Colin Renfrew, Marija Gimbutas and Ernestine S. Elster (eds.), Excavations at Sitagroi, a prehistoric village in northeast Greece. Vol. 1. Los Angeles, Institute of Archaeology, University of California, 1986.
