= Kalampaki =

Kalampaki Καλαμπάκι
- Municipal unit
- Location within the regional unit

- Location within Greece
- Coordinates: 41°03′N 24°11′E
- Country: Greece
- Administrative region: East Macedonia and Thrace
- Regional unit: Drama
- Municipality: Doxato

Area
  - Municipal unit: 81.1 km^{2} (31.3 sq mi)

Population (2021)
  - Municipal unit: 4,491
  - Municipal unit density: 55.4/km^{2} (143/sq mi)
  - Community: 2,652
- Time zone: UTC+2 (EET)
  - Summer (DST): UTC+3 (EEST)
- Vehicle registration: ΡΜ

Kalampaki (Greek: Καλαμπάκι, formerly Καλαμπάκιον) is a village and a former municipality in the Drama regional unit, East Macedonia and Thrace, Greece. Since the 2011 local government reform it is part of the municipality Doxato, of which it is the seat and a municipal unit. The municipal unit has an area of 81.064 km^{2}. It is 12 km to the south of Drama. The Kalambaki municipal unit consists of the villages of Kalampaki, Ftelia, Agia Paraskevi, Kalamonas and Nerofraktis. Most of the population is employed in the agricultural sector, with tobacco, corn and cotton being the main products.

The population of Kalambaki consists mainly of descendants of four population groups, Pontus Greeks, Greeks of Eastern Thrace, Greeks of Asia Minor (mainly from Cappadocia, whose ancestors spoke Turkish but were Greek Orthodox Christians in religion) and Greeks whose ancestors had been living in Kalambaki already before the Treaty of Lausanne (1923) was ratified.

In the vicinity of Kalambaki Roman milestones have been discovered indicating that the ancient Via Egnatia passed very close by.

Every year on January 18, the feast day of Saint Athanasius, a religious festival named the "Kourbani" is held in Kalambaki. It is possibly the Christian equivalent of the Muslim Kurban. During this day a dish consisting of veal in a type of wheat known as pligouri is produced and shared among the participants in the festival.
