= Kato Nevrokopi =

Town and municipality in Macedonia, Greece

Kato Nevrokopi Κάτω Νευροκόπι
- Municipality
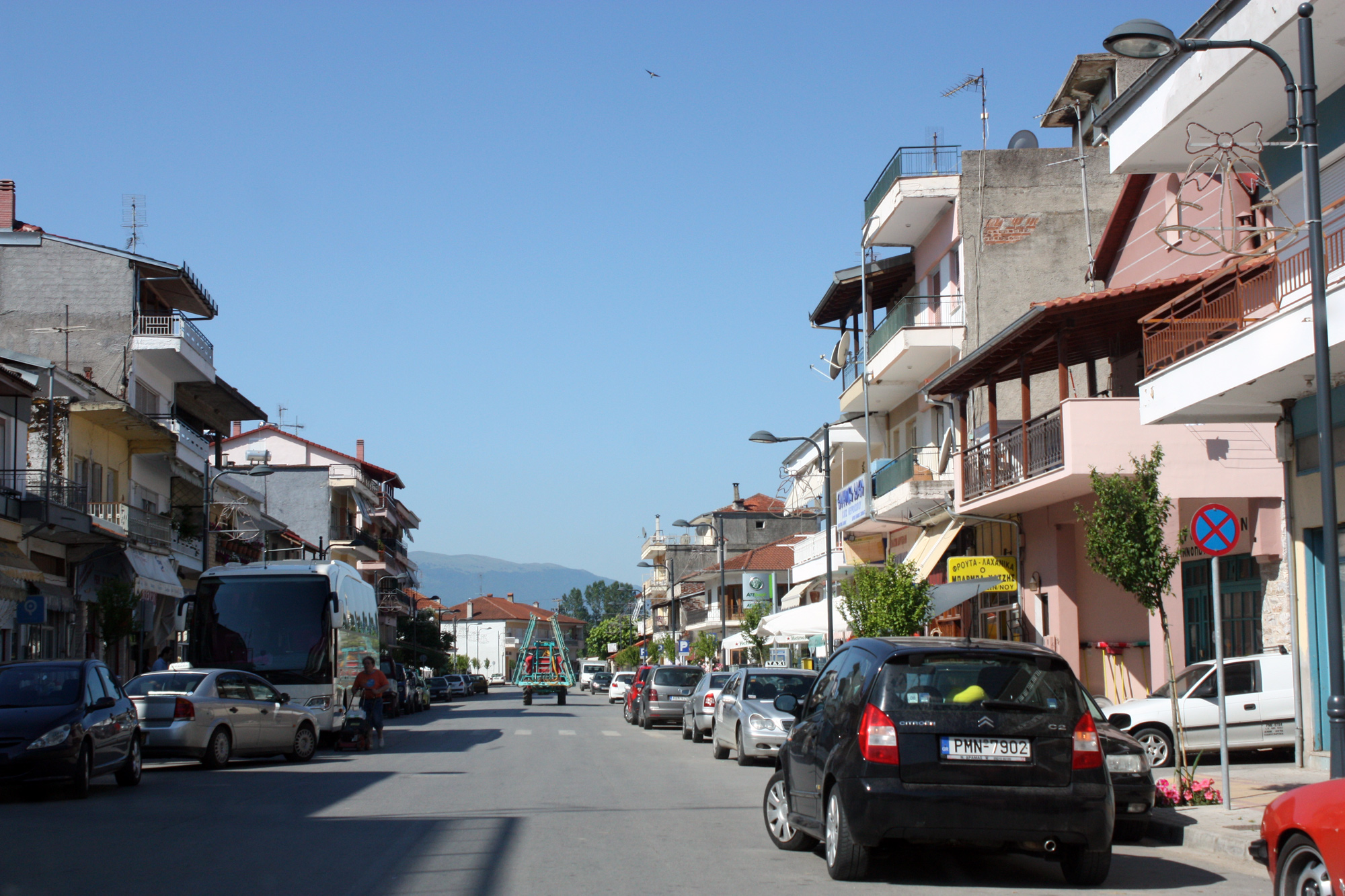
- Kato Nevrokopi center

- Location within Greece
- Coordinates: 41°21′N 23°52′E
- Country: Greece
- Geographic region: Macedonia
- Administrative region: East Macedonia and Thrace
- Regional unit: Drama

Area
  - Municipality: 873.6 km^{2} (337.3 sq mi)

Population (2021)
  - Municipality: 5,323
  - Density: 6.093/km^{2} (15.78/sq mi)
  - Community: 1,855
- Time zone: UTC+2 (EET)
  - Summer (DST): UTC+3 (EEST)
- Vehicle registration: ΡΜ

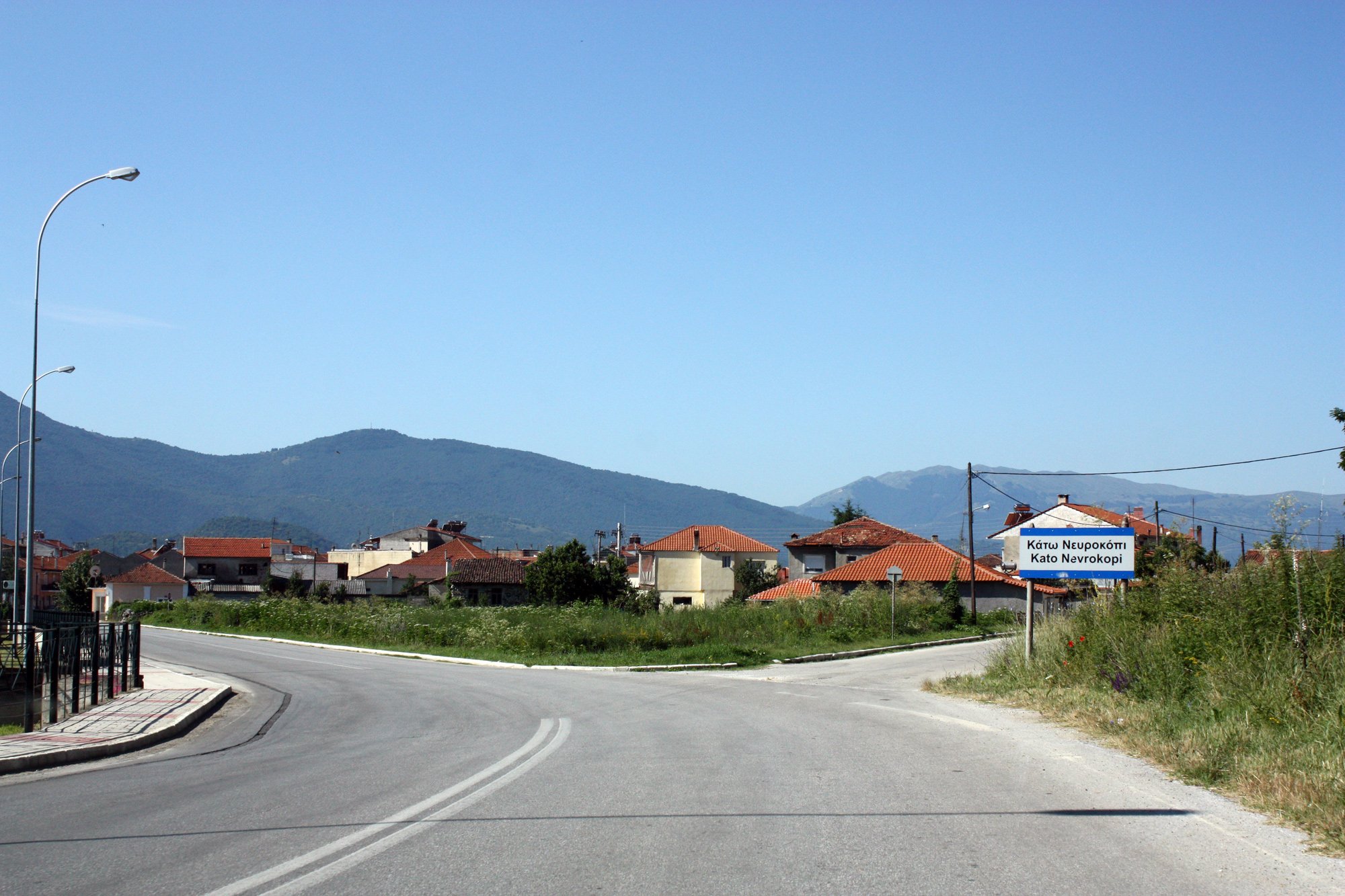
Entrance road to Kato Nevrokopi from the North

Kato Nevrokopi (Greek: Κάτω Νευροκόπι, romanized: Káto Nevrokópi "Lower Nevrokopi") is a municipality and town within that municipality in the northwest section of the Drama regional unit, Greece. Before the 2011 local government reform, it was the largest municipality in all of Greece, covering an area of 873.552 km^{2} (337.28 sq mi). The 2021 census reported a population of 5,323 inhabitants. The region is known for its very low temperatures during the winter and for its famous agricultural products such as potatoes and beans. The area offers several attractions for tourists: the ski center of Falakro, the traditional settlement in the village of Granitis (pop. 55), the historical bunker of Lise, the artificial lakes of Lefkogeia and Potamoí, the spectacular routes in the forests, the old churches. The forest paths offer excellent views to hikers. The largest towns are Kato Nevrokopi (the municipal seat, pop. 1,855), Volakas (783), Perithorio (569), Lefkogeia (321), Ochyro (314), Kato Vrontou (287) and Vathytopos (255). On the territory of the municipality are located several abandoned villages, including Monastiri and Mavrochori.

== History ==
In the ancient period, the region was inhabited by Thracian tribes, followed by Greek Macedonians and Romans.

It was conquered by the Ottoman Empire in 1383. After this, the village was predominantly settled by Bulgarians, with small numbers of Greeks, Turks and Vlachs. Following the Asia Minor Catastrophe and the subsequent population exchanges, the town was settled by large numbers of Greek refugees from Asia Minor as well as the nearby Nevrokop which became part of Bulgaria. In 1927, its name was changed from Ζύρνοβο (Zyrnovo, Зърново) to Kato Nevrokopi, while the nearby town of Nevrokop was later renamed Gotse Delchev.

On 18 April 1945, during fighting preceding the Greek Civil War, many Slavic Macedonian inhabitants left the area. Many of them resettled in Štip, North Macedonia.

Kato Nevrokopi is now a majority Greek village and a major town just before the Greek-Bulgarian border.

== Climate ==
Kato Nevrokopi has a humid continental climate. It is one of very few locations in Greece with this climate and is one of the coldest places in the country. It has cold and somewhat snowy winters and warm to hot somewhat humid summers. Precipitation tends to be balanced throughout the year, although there is a small Mediterranean climate influence resulting in July and August being, to a small degree, drier than the rest of the year. Temperatures of -20°C or below have been recorded numerous times in the past. However, there has been a warming trend in the last few years and such temperatures occur less often. Downpours and hail happen sometimes in form of showers in spring and summer. Blizzards and thick fogs in the wintertime have been reported occasionally.

Climate data for Kato Nevrokopi (2010-2019)
Month	Jan	Feb	Mar	Apr	May	Jun	Jul	Aug	Sep	Oct	Nov	Dec	Year
Mean daily maximum °C (°F)	5.2 (41.4)	9.3 (48.7)	13.4 (56.1)	18.5 (65.3)	22.6 (72.7)	26.9 (80.4)	30.3 (86.5)	31.1 (88.0)	26.0 (78.8)	19.2 (66.6)	13.6 (56.5)	6.8 (44.2)	18.58 (65.44)
Daily mean °C (°F)	0.45 (32.81)	3.9 (39.0)	7.2 (45.0)	11.5 (52.7)	15.7 (60.3)	19.7 (67.5)	22.25 (72.05)	22.5 (72.5)	18.15 (64.67)	12.4 (54.3)	8.05 (46.49)	1.85 (35.33)	11.97 (53.55)
Mean daily minimum °C (°F)	−4.3 (24.3)	−1.5 (29.3)	1.0 (33.8)	4.5 (40.1)	8.8 (47.8)	12.5 (54.5)	14.2 (57.6)	13.9 (57.0)	10.3 (50.5)	5.6 (42.1)	2.5 (36.5)	−3.1 (26.4)	5.37 (41.67)
Average rainfall mm (inches)	65 (2.6)	67 (2.6)	64 (2.5)	39 (1.5)	68 (2.7)	59 (2.3)	39 (1.5)	37 (1.5)	46 (1.8)	47 (1.9)	73 (2.9)	61 (2.4)	665 (26.2)
Source: National Observatory of Athens

== Transportation ==
The EO57 road passes through the village: Drama Provincial Roads 12 and 13 branch off the EO57, towards Potamoi and Vathytopos respectively.

== Notable people ==
- Armen Kouptsios
- Theodosius Gologanov
