= Prosotsani =

Town and municipality in Macedonia, Greece

Prosotsani Προσοτσάνη
- Municipality

- Location within Greece
- Coordinates: 41°11′N 23°58′E
- Country: Greece
- Geographic region: Macedonia
- Administrative region: East Macedonia and Thrace
- Regional unit: Drama

Area
  - Municipality: 481.8 km^{2} (186.0 sq mi)
  - Municipal unit: 419.0 km^{2} (161.8 sq mi)

Population (2021)
  - Municipality: 10,739
  - Density: 22.29/km^{2} (57.73/sq mi)
  - Municipal unit: 7,499
  - Municipal unit density: 17.90/km^{2} (46.35/sq mi)
  - Community: 3,169
- Time zone: UTC+2 (EET)
  - Summer (DST): UTC+3 (EEST)
- Vehicle registration: ΡΜ

Prosotsani (Greek: Προσοτσάνη, romanized: Prosotsáni, until 1925: Greek: Προσωτσάνη - Prosotsani, from 1925 until 1940: Greek: Πυρσόπολις - Pyrsopolis) is a municipality and town within the municipality located in the western part of the Drama regional unit in Greece. The 2021 census reported a population of 7,499 inhabitants for the municipal unit, and 3,169 for the town. A local attraction is the cave at the source of the Angitis River, located at the village of Angitis in the community of Kokkinogeia.

== History ==
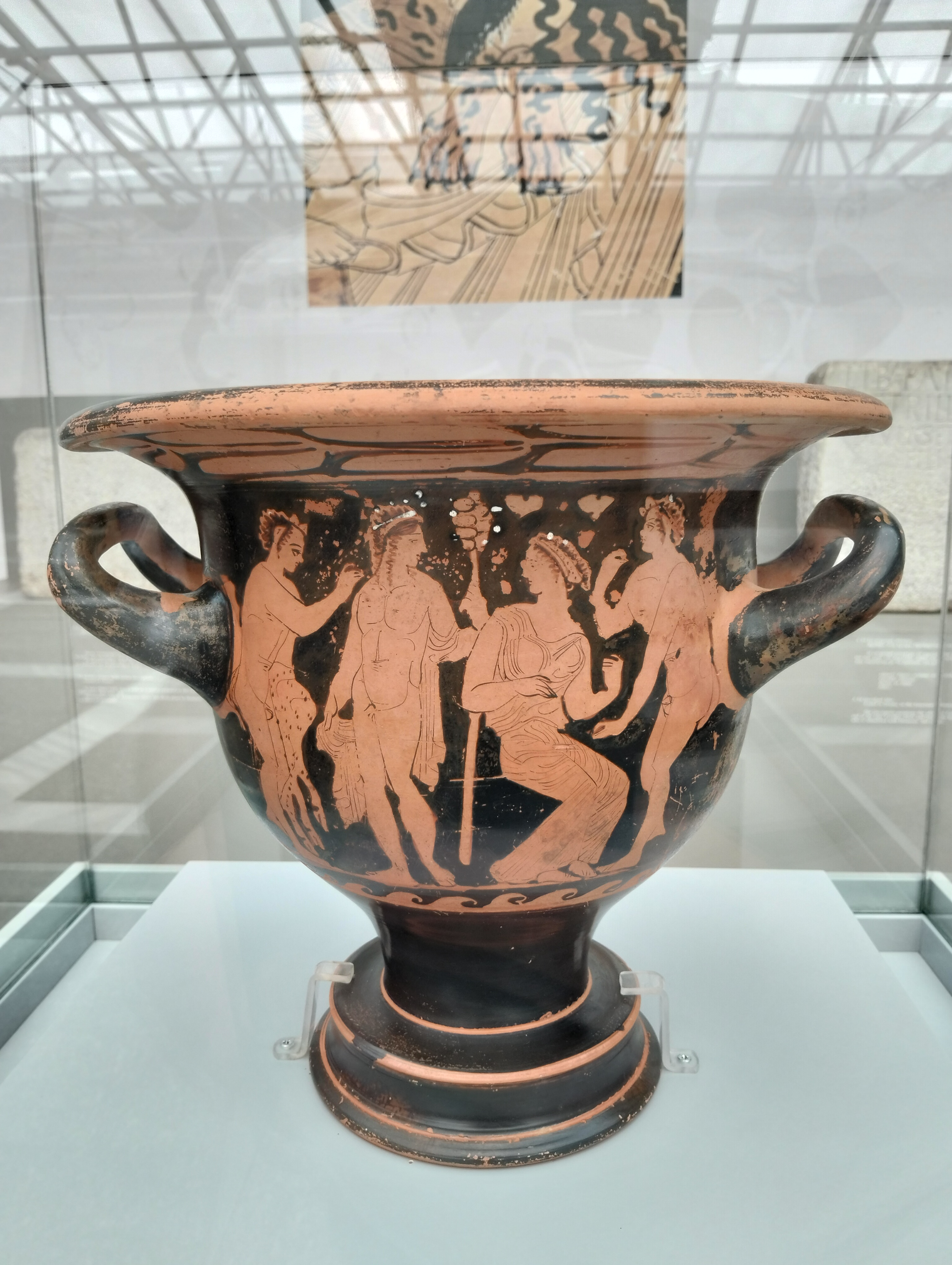
Ancient Greek krater from Prosotsani, 380 B.C.

Prosotsani is a historic town (and a former center of tobacco production) at the foot of Menekio mountain. It was a sub-district in the sanjak in the Salonica vilayet as "Pürsıçan" during Ottoman Era, before the Balkan Wars.

== Municipality ==
The municipality Prosotsani was formed at the 2011 local government reform by the merger of the following 2 former municipalities, which became municipal units:

- Prosotsani
- Sitagroi

== Popular culture ==
A Turkish TV series has been recorded here from 2007 to 2009. The series, Elveda Rumeli, tells the story of a Turkish milkman living with his family in Prosotsani during the forced migration of the Turkish population from Macedonia.

== Notable people ==
- FORG1VEN, professional League of Legends player
