= Doxato =

Town and municipality in Macedonia, Greece

Doxato Δοξάτο
- Municipality
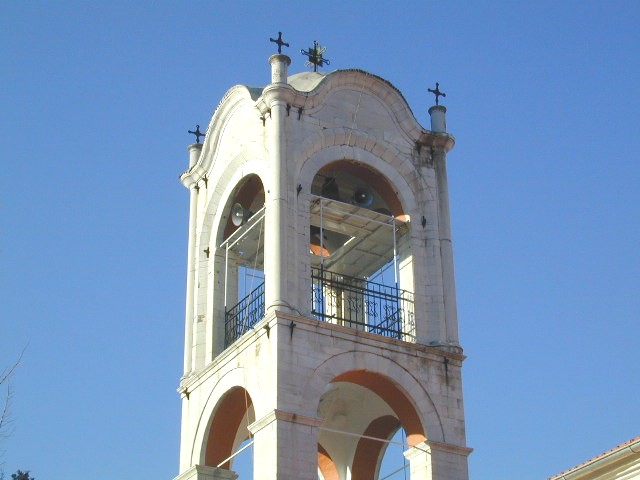
- Saint Athanasios bell tower

- Location within Greece
- Coordinates: 41°06′N 24°14′E
- Country: Greece
- Geographic region: Macedonia
- Administrative region: East Macedonia and Thrace
- Regional unit: Drama

Area
  - Municipality: 243.4 km^{2} (94.0 sq mi)
  - Municipal unit: 162.3 km^{2} (62.7 sq mi)

Population (2021)
  - Municipality: 12,059
  - Density: 49.54/km^{2} (128.3/sq mi)
  - Municipal unit: 7,568
  - Municipal unit density: 46.63/km^{2} (120.8/sq mi)
  - Community: 2,468
- Time zone: UTC+2 (EET)
  - Summer (DST): UTC+3 (EEST)
- Vehicle registration: ΡΜ

Doxato (Greek: Δοξάτο, romanized: Doxáto, formerly: Δοξάτον, romanized: Doxáton) is a town and municipality in the Drama regional unit, in East Macedonia and Thrace, Greece. The seat of the municipality is the town Kalampaki.

== Municipality ==
The municipality Doxato was formed at the 2011 local government reform by the merger of the following 2 former municipalities, that became municipal units:

- Doxato
- Kalampaki

The municipality has an area of 243.400 km^{2}, the municipal unit 162.336 km^{2}. The former municipality of Doxato was founded as a result of law 2539/1997 ("Plan Kapodistria"), by merging the former municipalities of Doxato and Megalou Alexandrou, and the former communities of Agios Athanasios and Kefalarion. According to the 2011 census, the former municipality had a population of 8,943 and the town 2,884.

== History ==
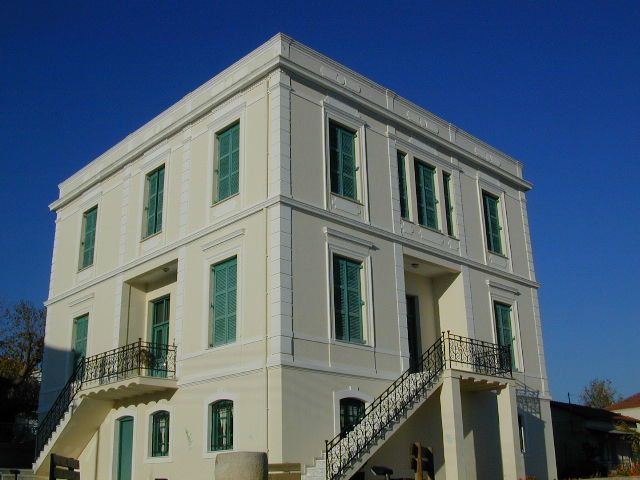
The cultural center of Doxato.

According to the statistics of Vasil Kanchov ("Macedonia, Ethnography and Statistics"), 900 Greek Christians, 850 Turks, 200 Gypsies, 120 Bulgarian Christians and 120 Vlachs lived in the town in 1900.

=== Doxato massacres ===
Doxato was the scene of two major massacres in recent history.

The first massacre occurred during the Second Balkan War, fought between Greece and Serbia on one hand and Bulgaria on the other. According to Greek sources, on 30 June 1913 a Bulgarian cavalry unit surrounded Doxato and proceeded to massacre between 500 and 600 inhabitants (depending on source), including women and children, burning the town to the ground in the process. However, according to a report by an international commission, organized by the Carnegie Endowment, the massacre had been actually committed by local Turks armed by the Bulgarian army.

The second massacre took place on 29 September 1941 during the Second World War, when Doxato was again (together with the rest of Eastern Macedonia and Thrace) under Bulgarian occupation. During the night of 28–29 September 1941, an insurrection against the Bulgarian occupation troops broke out in nearby Drama by the Communist party of Greece (KKE) and spread to the surrounding country. The local police station in Doxato was attacked, leading to the death of 6-7 Bulgarian policemen. Although those who participated in the insurrection were killed or fled to the mountains, reprisals were harsh. The next day, Bulgarian forces rounded up all the men in town aged 14 and over, and after dividing them into groups of ten, executed them on the night of 29 September 1941. After the revolt, a period of state terror began, involving arrests, house searches and physical violence against citizens.

== Distinctions ==
The Greek government has awarded the town the title of Hero and Martyr City (Ηρωική και Μαρτυρική Πόλη) in recognition of the massacres it has suffered.
