= Drama (regional unit) =

Drama Περιφερειακή Ενότητα Δράμας
- Regional unit
- Municipalities of Drama

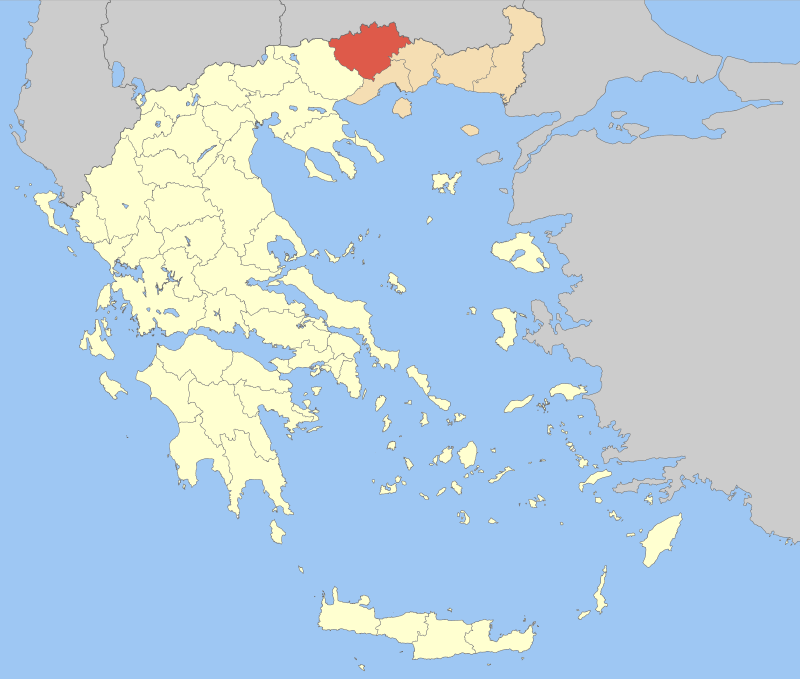
- Drama within Greece

- Location within Greece
- Coordinates: 41°15′N 24°10′E
- Country: Greece
- Administrative region: Eastern Macedonia and Thrace
- Seat: Drama

Area
  - Total: 3,468 km^{2} (1,339 sq mi)

Population (2021)
  - Total: 86,643
  - Density: 24.98/km^{2} (64.71/sq mi)
- Time zone: UTC+2 (EET)
  - Summer (DST): UTC+3 (EEST)
- Postal code: 66x xx
- Area code: 252x0
- Vehicle registration: ΡΜ

Drama (Greek: Περιφερειακή Ενότητα Δράμας, Perifereiakí Enótita Drámas) is one of the regional units of Greece. It is part of the Region of East Macedonia and Thrace. Its capital is the town of Drama. The regional unit is the northernmost within the geographical region of Macedonia and the westernmost in the administrative region of East Macedonia and Thrace. The northern border with Bulgaria is formed by the Rhodope Mountains.

== Geography ==
The northern part of the regional unit, bordering Bulgaria, is very mountainous. The main mountain ranges are Orvilos (Bulgarian: Славянка - Slavyanka) in the northwest, Falakro in the north (at 2232m the highest point of the regional unit), the western Rhodope Mountains in the northeast (including mounts Frakto, Elatia, Koula etc.) and Menoikio in the southwest. The Nestos is the longest river, flowing in the northeast. The northern portion holds a unique treasure known as Karantere (or Forest of Elatia).

Drama is surrounded by the regional units of Xanthi to the east, Kavala to the south, Serres to the southwest and the west, and the Bulgarian provinces of Blagoevgrad and Smolyan to the north. Arable lands are located in the southern and the west-central portions of Drama.

The southern part mainly has a Mediterranean climate. The climate is more continental with cold winters at higher elevations and in the northern part.

== Administration ==
The Drama regional unit is subdivided into 5 municipalities. These are (number as in the map in the infobox):

- Doxato (2)
- Drama (1)
- Kato Nevrokopi (3)
- Paranesti (4)
- Prosotsani (5)

=== Prefecture ===
As a part of the 2011 Kallikratis government reform, the former Drama Prefecture (Greek: Νομός Δράμας) was transformed into a regional unit within the East Macedonia and Thrace region. The prefecture had the same territory as the present regional unit. At the same time, the municipalities were reorganised, according to the table below.

According to the 2011 census, the Drama regional unit had a population of 98,287, 11,666 more inhabitants than in the 2021 census.

New municipality	Old municipalities	Seat
Doxato	Doxato	Kalampaki
Doxato	Kalampaki	Kalampaki
Drama	Drama	Drama
Drama	Sidironero	Drama
Kato Nevrokopi	Kato Nevrokopi	Kato Nevrokopi
Paranesti	Paranesti	Paranesti
Paranesti	Nikiforos	Paranesti
Prosotsani	Prosotsani	Prosotsani
Prosotsani	Sitagroi	Prosotsani

== Transport ==
The Thessaloniki–Alexandroupolis railway passes through the regional unit, with Drama and Paranesti being the main train stations. There are also three national roads in the unit: the EO12 towards Thessaloniki and Kavala; the EO14 towards Xanthi; and the EO57 towards Exochi and Bulgaria.

== See also ==
- List of settlements in the Drama regional unit
- Former toponyms of places in Drama Prefecture
