= Georgios Koutles =

Greek soldier

Kapetan (Chieftain) Georgios Koutles
- Native name: Γεώργιος Κούτλες
- Born: c. 1880s Alistrati, Salonika Vilayet, Ottoman Empire (now Greece)
- Allegiance: Kingdom of Greece
- Service / branch: HMC
- Battles / wars: Macedonian Struggle: Battle of Karlikova; Battle of Gratsiani

Georgios Koutles (Greek: Γεώργιος Κούτλες) was a Greek chieftain of the Macedonian Struggle from Alistrati, Serres.

== Biography ==
Georgios Koutles was born in the end of the 19th century in Alistrati, Serres. He initially participated in the Macedonian struggle as a leader of guerrilla forces in the area of Fyllida. He then formed himself an armed group which he commanded. He was active in the areas of Fyllida, Serres and Drama, undertaking risky night operations. He cooperated with the chieftain Doukas Gaitatzis. He participated with his group in the battle of Poursova (in the modern Prosotsani municipality) together with the united bands of Theodoros Boulasikis, Ioannis Martzios and Vasileios Tsouvaltzis, against Bulgarian komitadjis. He also took part in the battle of Karlikova and, with the bands of Doukas Gaitatzis and Vasileios Tsouvaltzis in the battle of Gratsiani (in the modern municipality of Nea Zichni), during which the band of the Bulgarian komitadji Todor Panitsa was destroyed.
