= Vyroneia =

Vyroneia Βυρώνεια
- Community
- Location within Greece
- Coordinates: 41°16′N 23°15′E
- Country: Greece
- Administrative region: Central Macedonia
- Regional unit: Serres
- Municipality: Sintiki
- Municipal unit: Petritsi

Area
  - Community: 44.42 km^{2} (17.15 sq mi)

Population (2021)
  - Community: 702
  - Density: 15.8/km^{2} (40.9/sq mi)
- Time zone: UTC+2 (EET)
  - Summer (DST): UTC+3 (EEST)
- Postal code: 620 43
- Area code: 2320
- Vehicle registration: ΕΡ

Vyroneia (Greek: Βυρώνεια, before 1924: Χατζή Μπεηλίκ - Chatzi Beilik) is a town located in the municipal unit of Petritsi in the northwestern part of Serres regional unit, Greece. It is situated near the Bulgarian border, on the right bank of the river Strymon, south of the Kerkini mountains, and east of the Lake Kerkini. Vyroneia is 4 km (2.5 mi) west of Neo Petritsi and 12 km (7.5 mi) northwest of Sidirokastro. The community has an area of 44.42 km^{2} (17.15 sq mi).

== History ==
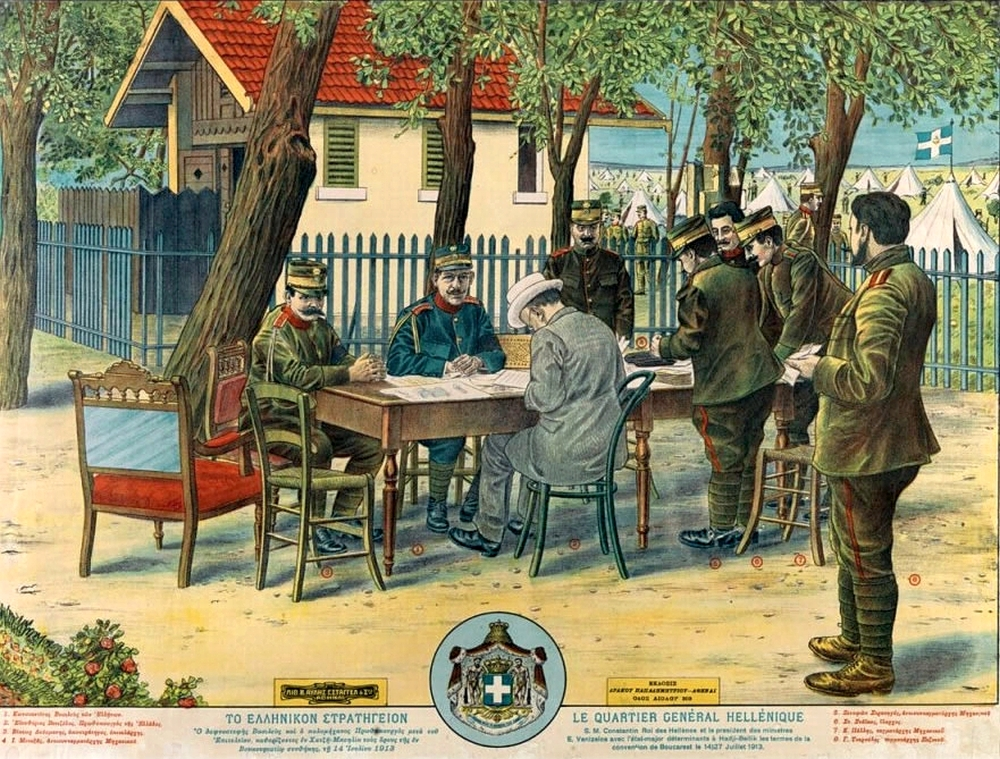
The Greek GHQ at Vyroneia (Hadji-Beylik), with King Constantine I and Prime Minister Eleftherios Venizelos deliberating before the Congress of Bucharest

Vyroneia, then known as Hadji-Beylik, was a military base for the Greek army during the Second Balkan War. The village was also used as a military base for male civilians who had been conscripted due to the general mobilisation of 1974.

== Transport ==
The settlement has a station on the railway line from Thessaloniki to Serres and Alexandroupoli. Near the train station is the National Aquarium of Vyroneia, the second in Greece after Rhodes. The Vyroneia Cultural Society presents every June a cultural event called "Vyroneia".

== Historical population ==
Historical population
Year	Pop.	±%
1981	1,546	—
1991	1,094	−29.2%
2001	1,114	+1.8%
2011	923	−17.1%
2021	702	−23.9%

== Persons ==
- Ioannis Melissanidis
- Kostas Iosifidis

== See also ==
- List of settlements in the Serres regional unit
