= Nikolaos Gousios =

Greek chieftain of the Macedonian Struggle

Kapetan (Chieftain) Nikolaos Gousios
- Νικόλαος Γούσιος
- Born: c. 1880s Demir Hisar, Salonika Vilayet, Ottoman Empire (now Sidirokastro, Greece)
- Military career
- Allegiance: Kingdom of Greece
- Branch: HMC; Hellenic Army
- Conflicts: Macedonian Struggle; Balkan Wars: First Balkan War; Second Balkan War
- Other work: Teacher

Nikolaos Gousios (Greek: Νικόλαος Γούσιος) was a Greek chieftain of the Macedonian Struggle.

== Biography ==
Gousios was born in the 1880s in Demir hisar, then Ottoman Empire (now Sidirokastro, Greece) of Serres. He set up an armed group that was active until 1906 in the area of Sintiki, Serres and Petrich. From 1906 to 1907, he cooperated with the bodies of Doukas Gaitatzis and Stergios Vlachveis as the leader of his own group. He took part in many operations against Bulgarian groups operating in the region. After 1908, he was placed as a teacher at the Greek School of Starchevo, having as mission the information about the movements of the Bulgarians in the region. He was often imprisoned by the Ottoman authorities for his actions. With the outbreak of the First Balkan War, he rushed to be a volunteer.

== Sources & References ==
- Αρχείο Διεύθυνσης Εφέδρων Πολεμιστών Αγωνιστών Θυμάτων Αναπήρων (ΔΕΠΑΘΑ), Αρχείο Μακεδονικού Αγώνα, φ. Γ-241
- John S. Koliopoulos (editor), Αφανείς, γηγενείς Μακεδονομάχοι, Εταιρεία Μακεδονικών Σπουδών, University Studio Press, Thessaloniki, 2008, p. 158
