= Neo Petritsi railway station =

Railway station in Greece

Νέο Πετρίτσι Neo Petritsi

General information
- Location: Sintiki 620 43, Serres; Greece
- Coordinates: 41°16′12″N 23°17′52″E
- Owner: GAIAOSE
- Line: Thessaloniki–Alexandroupoli railway
- Platforms: 1
- Tracks: 1
- Train operators: Hellenic Train
- Connections: Proastiakos

Construction
- Structure type: at-grade
- Depth: 1
- Platform levels: 1
- Parking: Yes

Other information
- Status: Unstaffed
- Website: http://www.ose.gr/en/

History
- Electrified: No

Services
Preceding station	Regional Rail	Following station
Vyroneia towards Thessaloniki	Line T3	Strymonas towards Drama
Suspended services
Preceding station	Hellenic Train	Following station
Vyroneia towards Thessaloniki	InterCity Thessaloniki–Alexandroupoli Fast train	Sidirokastro towards Alexandroupoli
Vyroneia towards Thessaloniki	InterCity Thessaloniki–Alexandroupoli	Strymonas towards Alexandroupoli
Vyroneia towards Thessaloniki	InterCity Thessaloniki–Serres	Strymonas towards Serres
Location
- Location within Greece

Neo Petritsi railway station (Greek: Σιδηροδρομικός Σταθμός Νέο Πετρίτσι, romanized: Sidirodromikós stathmós Neo Petritsi) is a railway station that servers the community of Petritsi, in Serres in Central Macedonia, Greece. The station is located just south of the settlement but still within the settlement limits. The station is unstaffed.

== History ==
In 2009, with the Greek debt crisis unfolding OSE's Management was forced to reduce services across the network. Timetables were cutback, routes closed, and stations left abandoned as the government-run entity attempted to reduce overheads. Services from Thessaloniki and Alexandroupolis were reduced from six to just two trains a day, reducing the reliability of services and passenger numbers. In 2017 OSE's passenger transport sector was privatised as TrainOSE, currently, a wholly owned subsidiary of Ferrovie dello Stato Italiane infrastructure, including stations, remained under the control of OSE. Since 2020, the station is served by the Thessaloniki Regional Railway (formerly the Suburban Railway). In July 2022, the station began being served by Hellenic Train, the rebranded TranOSE

In August 2025, the Greek Ministry of Infrastructure and Transport confirmed the creation of a new body, Greek Railways (Greek: Σιδηρόδρομοι Ελλάδος, romanized: Ellinikí Sidiródromi Monoprósopi) to assume responsibility for rail infrastructure, planning, modernisation projects, and rolling stock across Greece. Previously, these functions were divided among several state-owned entities: OSE, which managed infrastructure; ERGOSÉ, responsible for modernisation projects; and GAIAOSÉ, which owned stations, buildings, and rolling stock. OSE had overseen both infrastructure and operations until its vertical separation in 2005. Rail safety has been identified as a key priority. The merger follows the July approval of a Parliamentary Bill to restructure the national railway system, a direct response to the Tempi accident of February 2023, in which 43 people died after a head-on collision.

== Facilities ==
The station is little more than a halt, with only a small brick building (set back from the platform edge. As of (2022) the station is unstaffed, with no staffed booking office. There is no footbridge over the lines, though passengers can walk across the rails and not wheelchair accessible. The platform has a shelter with seating. However, there are no electronic departure and arrival screens or timetable poster boards on the platforms.

== Services ==
As of 12 May 2025, Line 3 of the Thessaloniki Regional Railway calls at this station: service is currently limited, with two trains per day to Thessaloniki (trains 1635 and 3633), one train per day to Serres (3632), and one train per day to Drama (1634, via Serres).

It was also served by two long-distance trains between Thessaloniki and Alexandroupolis, but the service is currently suspended.
