= Promachonas =

Village in Macedonia, Greece

Promachonas Προμαχώνας
- Municipal unit
- Location within the regional unit

- Location within Greece
- Coordinates: 41°22′N 23°22′E
- Country: Greece
- Geographic region: Macedonia
- Administrative region: Central Macedonia
- Regional unit: Serres
- Municipality: Sintiki

Area
  - Municipal unit: 42.2 km^{2} (16.3 sq mi)
- Elevation: 80 m (260 ft)

Population (2021)
  - Municipal unit: 184
  - Municipal unit density: 4.36/km^{2} (11.3/sq mi)
- Time zone: UTC+2 (EET)
  - Summer (DST): UTC+3 (EEST)
- Area code: 23230
- Vehicle registration: ΕΡ

Promachonas (Greek: Προμαχώνας, Bulgarian: Драготин, Dragotin) is a village and a former community in the Serres regional unit, Macedonia, Greece. Since the 2011 local government reform it is part of the municipality Sintiki, of which it is a municipal unit. The municipal unit has an area of 42.212 km^{2}. Population 184 (2021). A major border crossing with Bulgaria is located here. The Bulgarian town opposite Promachonas is Kulata.

== History ==
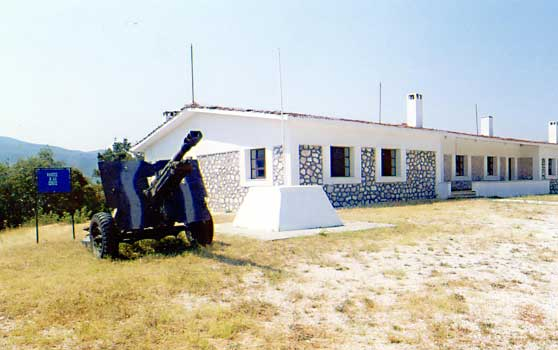
Fort Roupel

The village was annexed in 1913 by Greek forces during the Second Balkan War. During the years of Ottoman rule, the village was known by its Bulgarian name Dragotin. After the events of the Greek genocide in Asia Minor, refugees settled in the village. In 1927 the village was renamed Promachonas. Around the village, there are also the villages of Kapnotopos (2km north-east) and Kleidi (until 1926 known as Roupel/Rupel, in Byzantine times as Rupelion, 4km south). In 1928 Promachonas numbered 463 inhabitants. Before World War II, the village numbered 1,528 inhabitants, but with the beginning of the Greek-Italian War, the village and its other 2 settlements were evacuated. After the liberation of Greece from the Axis and the Greek Civil War, the refugees settled (from the other two settlements) in Promachonas, and thus the village has 245 inhabitants. In the national census of 1961, the village numbered 416 inhabitants.

Promachonas-Topolnica is an important Late Neolithic settlement and cult site that straddles the Greek-Bulgarian border a few kilometers from the community of Promachonas.

== Monument ==
Five kilometres south of Promachonas (2km south of A25 Exit 16), right next to the Thessaloniki-Promachonas highway at Kleidi settlement, there is a monument dedicated to the Byzantine Emperor of the Macedonian dynasty Basil II (Monument of the Battle of the Key). At the top of the monument is placed the symbol of Byzantium, the double-headed eagle, while on the marble column, an inscription has been engraved. The site of the Battle of the Key where Basil II defeated the Bulgarian army in 1014 is 35 km away, now inside Bulgaria.

== Transport ==
=== Rail ===
Promachonas railway station is north of the village, on the Strymon–Kulata railway: there are currently no passenger trains, with Strymonas being the nearest operational station (for the Thessaloniki Regional Railway).

=== Road ===
Promachonas is served by the A25 motorway towards Serres and Thessaloniki, the EO63 towards Blagoevgrad and Sofia in Bulgaria, and Serres Provincial Road 35 towards Agkistro and Achladochori.
