= Ioannis Martzios =

Greek chieftain

Kapetan (Chieftain) Ioannis Martzios
- Ιωάννης Μάρτζιος
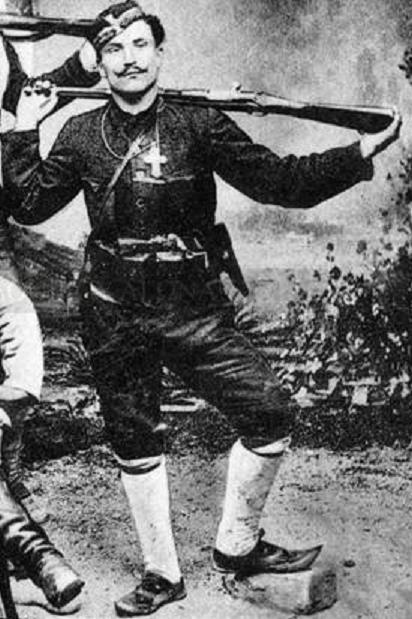
- Ioannis Martzios during the Macedonian Struggle.
- Born: c. 1870s Gornica, Drama, Salonika Vilayet, Ottoman Empire (now Kali Vrysi, Greece)
- Died: Unknown
- Military career
- Allegiance: Kingdom of Greece
- Branch: HMC
- Conflicts: Macedonian Struggle

Ioannis Martzios (Greek: Ιωάννης Μάρτζιος) or Martsios or Bartsios was a significant Greek chieftain of the Macedonian Struggle.

== Biography ==
Martzios was born in the 1870s in Gornica (now Kali Vrysi) of Drama. When he was 14, Bulgarian komitadjis assassinated his father. He finished school in Alistrati and continued his studies in Poros.

=== Armed actions ===
He returned to Macedonia and specifically to Serres, where he joined the armed group of Doukas Gaitatzis. Soon he was distinguished for his abilities and became a co-leader of the body that operated in the Zichni area. He took part with Gaitatzis in various confidential missions, such as against the komitadji Todor Panitsa, in Gratsiani (now Agiochori).

He then formed his own armed body and acted throughout the area of Serres and Fyllida. He collaborated with the local bodies of the chieftains Vasileios Tsouvaltzis and Theodoros Boulasikis. With his body he took part in important battles against Bulgarian komitadjis in Pursovo (now Anthochori) and in Karlikova (now Mikropoli).

On July 24, 1908, following the Young Turk Revolution and the granting of a general amnesty, he entered the city of Serres, where the citizens received him as a hero.

A street in Serres bears his name.
