= Strymon-Kulata railway =

Railway crossing through Bulgaria and Greece

Strymon–Kulata railway

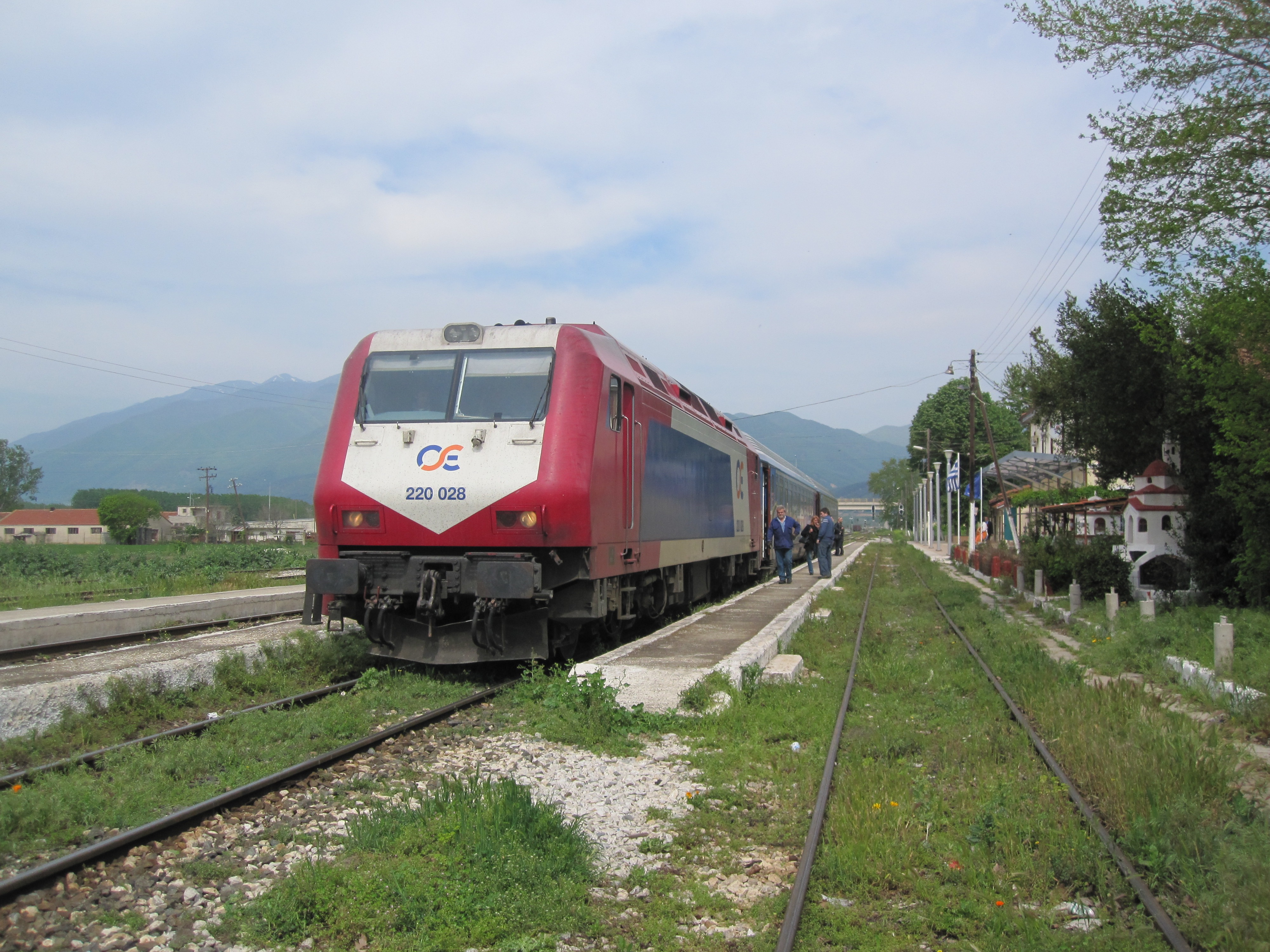
- A class 220 Adtranz/Bombardier at Strymon in 2010

Overview
- Status: Non-Operational (Replaced by motorbus)
- Owner: GAIAOSE
- Locale: Greece (Central Macedonia), Bulgaria (Blagoevgrad)
- Termini: Strymon 40.6444°N 22.9294°E; Kulata 41.3875°N 23.363889°E
- Stations: 3

Service
- System: Regional (cross border)
- Operator(s): Hellenic Train

History
- Opened

Technical
- Line length: 17.5 km (10.9 mi)
- Number of tracks: single track
- Track gauge: 1,435 mm (4 ft 8 1/2 in) standard gauge
- Electrification: No
- Operating speed: 100 km/h (60 mph) maximum

The Strymon-Kulata railway is a 17.5-kilometre-long (10.9 mi) railway line that connects the village of Strymon in Greece with Kulata in Bulgaria. The line unites three villages on opposite sides of the border, Strymon and Promachonas in Serres, Greece, and Kulata in Blagoevgrad, Bulgaria, and is entrance/exit to the Greek rail network from Bulgaria.

== Infrastructure ==
the line consists of a single 1,435 mm (4 ft 8 1/2 in) standard gauge line with a total length of 14.5 km (9.0 mi), constructed of old superstructure materials (S33B rails and S33 metal sleepers). The line is posted with a maximum speed of 100 km/h (60 mph) and a maximum axle load of 20.0 t (19.7 long tons; 22.0 short tons). There are two tunnels and five bridges between Strymon and Promachonas, and service is provided to two passenger stations.

== Course ==
The southern terminus of the Strymon–Kulata railway is Strymon on a branch from the Thessaloniki–Alexandroupoli line. At Strymon, the line connects with a northbound line along Strymon River Valley to Promachonas, The line consists of a railway of approximately 17.5-kilometre-long (10.9 mi), of which 16.1-kilometre-long (10.0 mi) are located within Greece, with the remaining 1.4-kilometre-long (0.87 mi) located in Bulgaria. The line then joins with the Bulgarian network at Kulata. From Kulata the line continues to Sofia via Bulgariavia.

== Main stations ==
The stations on the Thessaloniki–Bitola railway are:

- Strymonas railway station
- Promachonas railway station
- Kulata railway station

== Services ==
The Strymon - Koulata Railway Line is an international Regional railway line between Greece and Bulgaria.

- Thessaloniki-Sofia Express Thessaloniki–Sofia
- Regional services Kulata–Strymon

(Until further notice, this train is replaced by a 14-kilometre-long (8.7 mi) bus service between Kulata on the Bulgarian side of the Greek border and Strymon on the Greek side is in operation, from where a train continues to Thessaloniki.)

== See also ==
- Chemins de fer Orientaux
