= Kulata railway station =

Railway station in Sofia, Bulgaria

Kulata Кулата
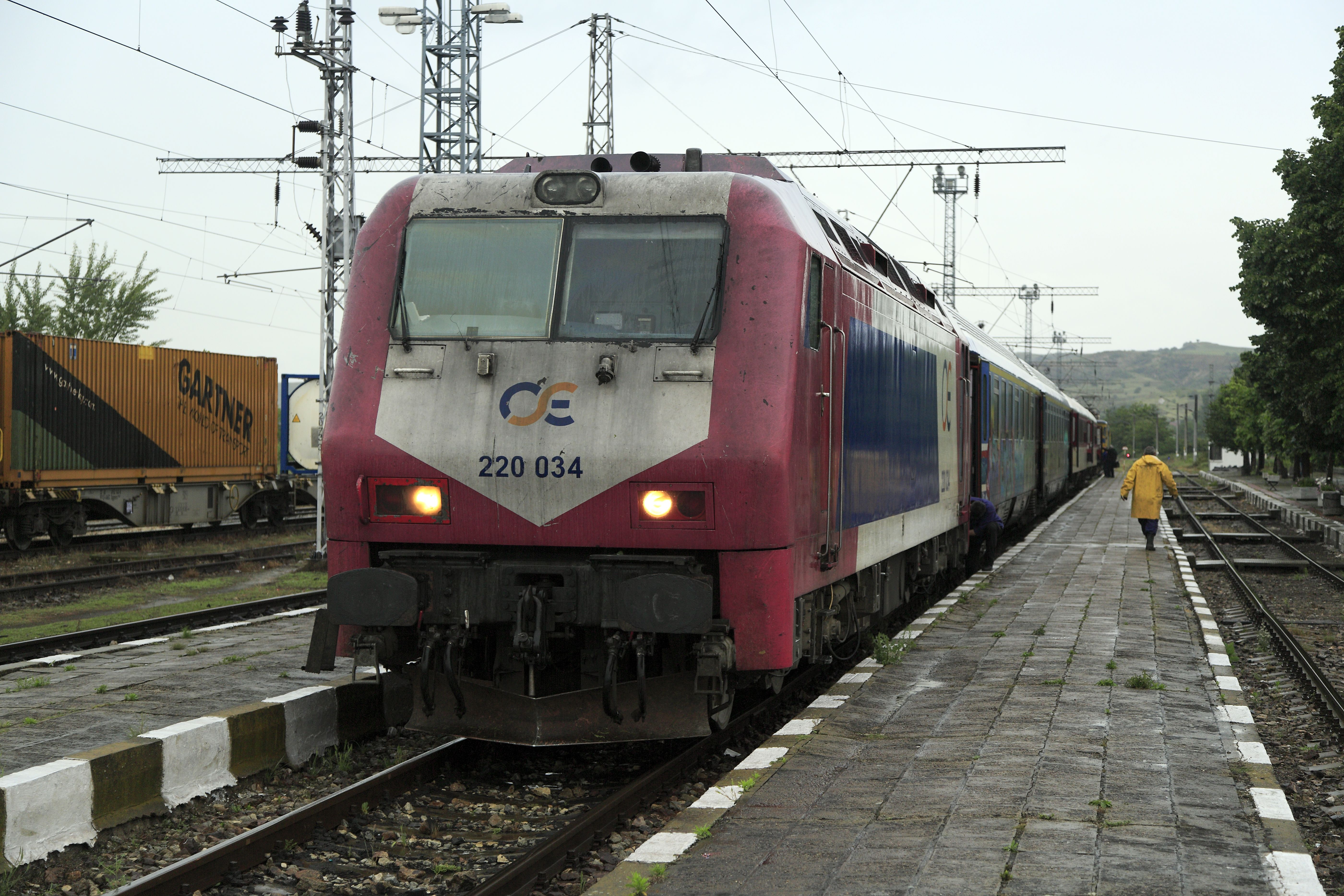
- The station, May 2016

General information
- Location: 2865 Kulata, Bulgaria; Bulgaria
- Coordinates: 41°23′29″N 23°21′42″E
- Owner: NRIC
- Lines: Strymon-Kulata railway (Greece); Railway Line 5 (Bulgaria)
- Platforms: (2 island platforms, 1 side platform)
- Tracks: 3

Construction
- Structure type: At-grade
- Parking: Yes

Services
Preceding station	BDŽ	Following station
Marikostino towards [[ railway station|]]	Thessaloniki-Sofia Express	Strymonas towards Thessaloniki
Location

Kulatа railway station (Bulgarian: гара Кулата) is a railway station in the border village of Kulata, Petrich municipality, Blagoevgrad region, Bulgaria. It is a railway border checkpoint (connecting to the Greek station Promachon, and from there to Komotini and Thessaloniki) located 1.5 km from the border with Greece.

== History ==
In 2015 a train to Kulata was delayed due to a bomb scare.

== Services ==
Although it is an extreme border station, the station is served daily by passenger trains to the cities of Sandanski, Dupnitsa, Petrich, Blagoevgrad and Sofia, including the international direction Sofia-Thessalonica-Sofia, which has been resumed since May 2014, after nearly 3 year suspension.

== Gallery ==
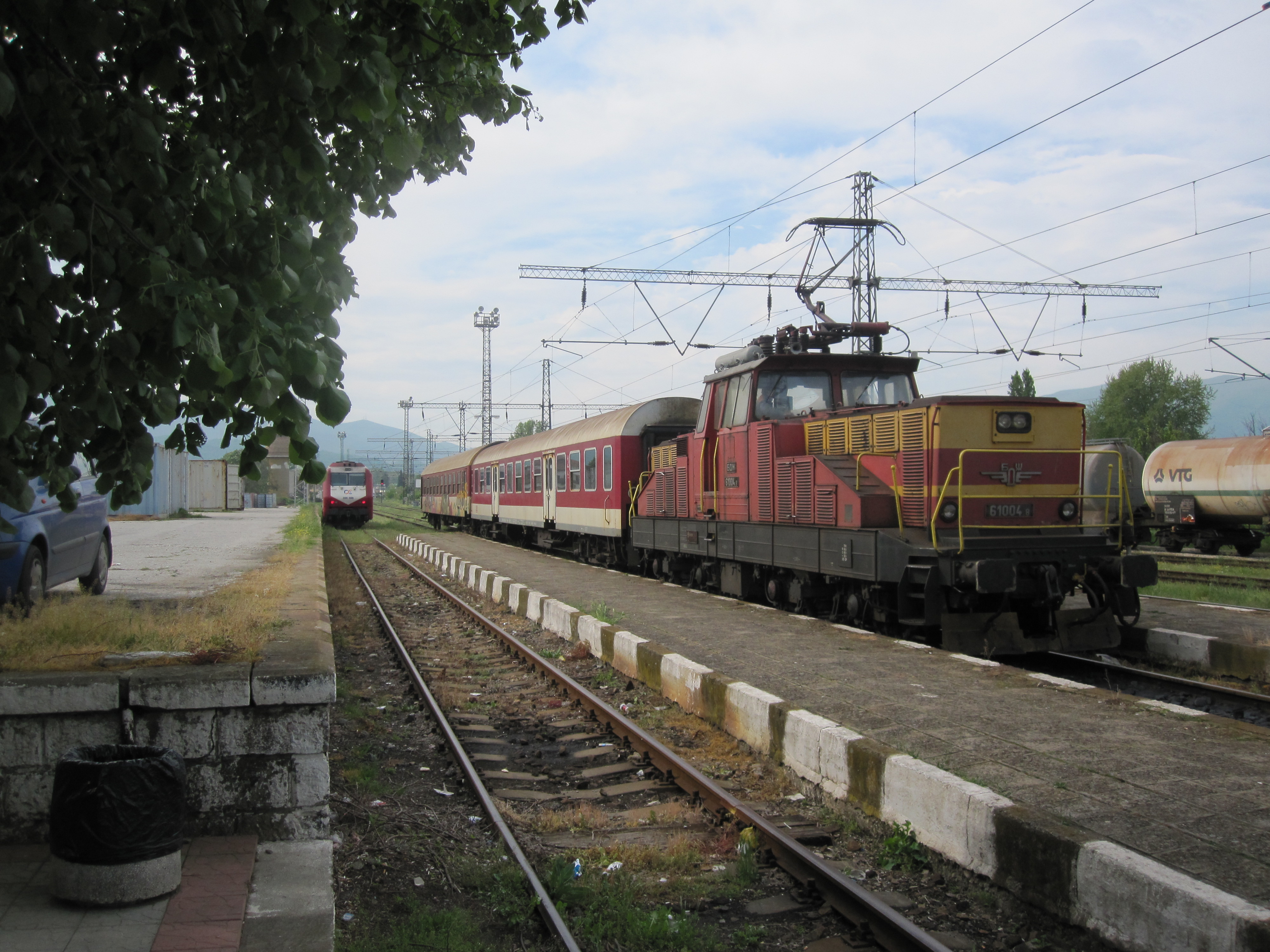
Skoda built single cabbed loco in foreground, the 61004 is seen at the station, 21 April 2010.

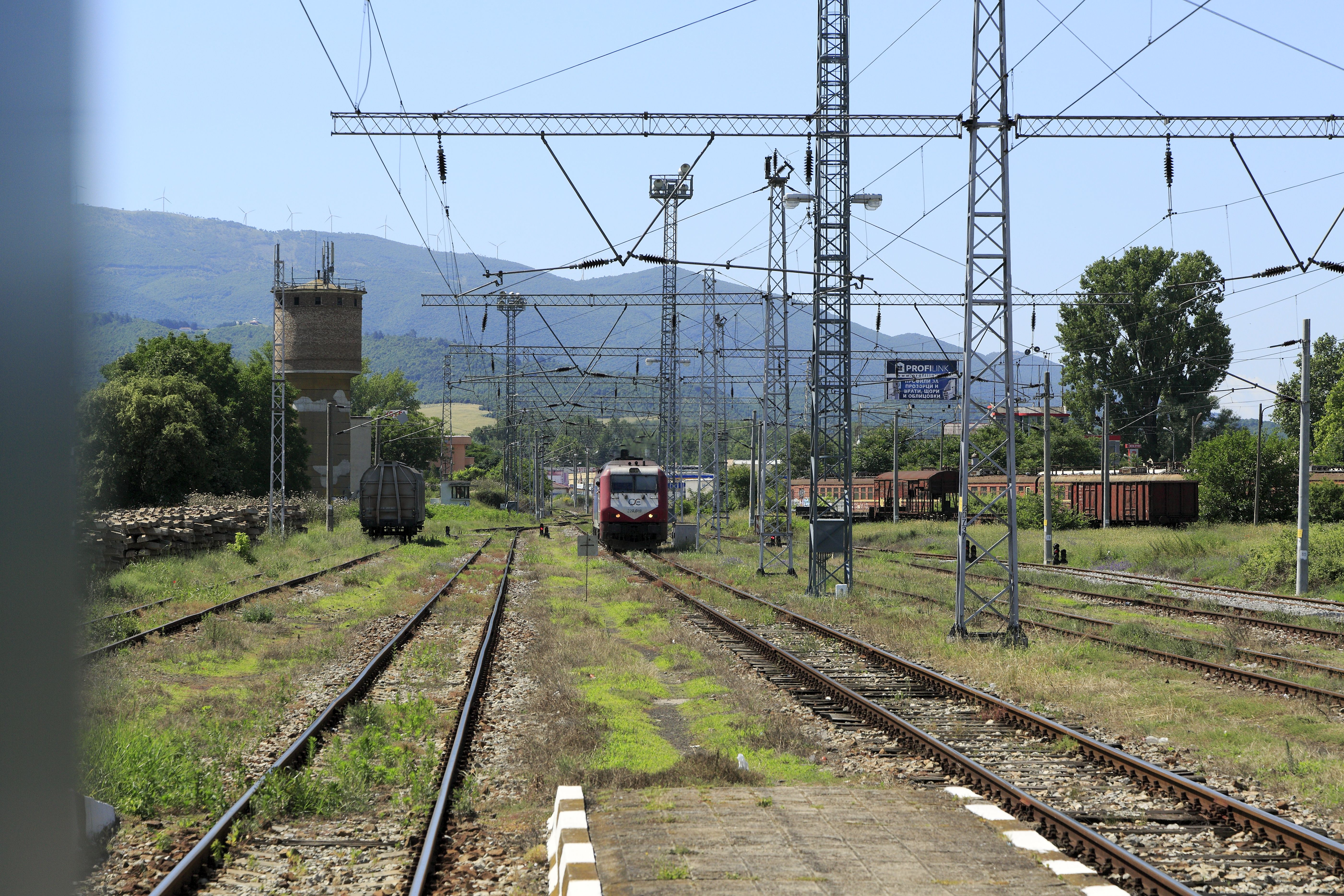
Greek diesel locomotive that brought train 360 Thessaloníki–Sofia from Strymonas returns to Greece after uncoupling, June 2016
