= Theodoros Boulasikis =

Greek Macedonian fighter

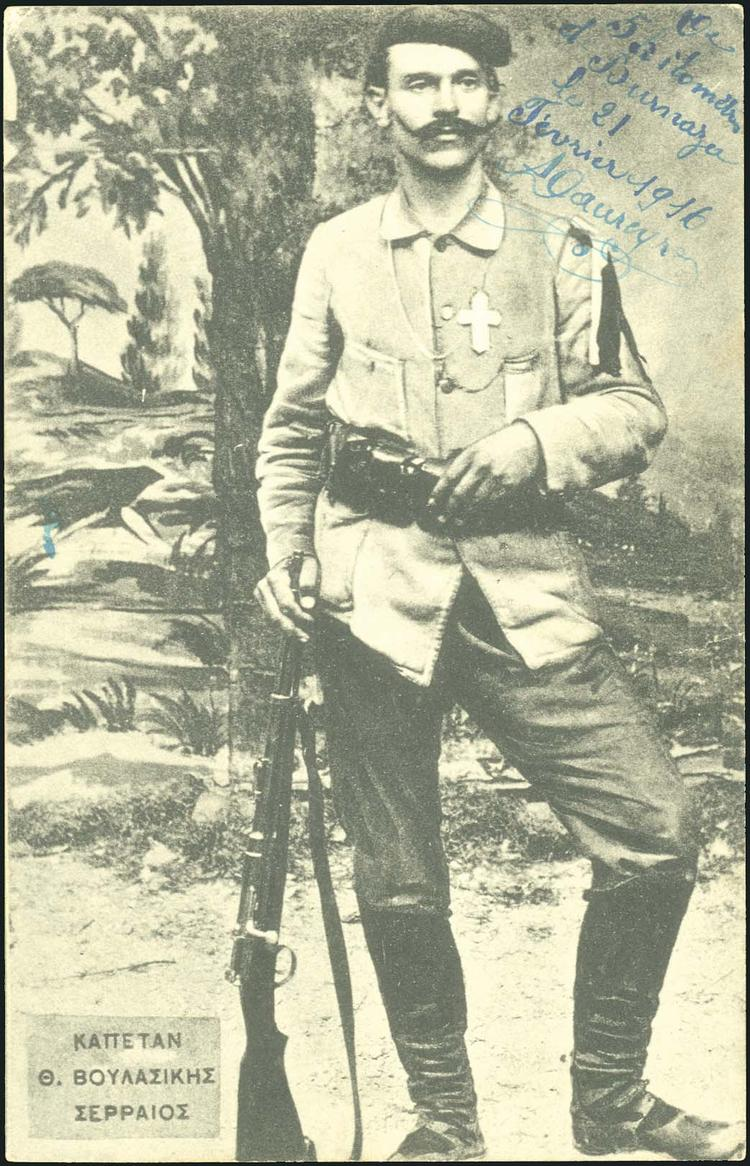
- Theodoros Boulasikis c. 1908
- Native name: Θεόδωρος Ι. Μπουλασίκης
- Born: 1873; Serres, Salonika Vilayet, Ottoman Empire (now Greece)
- Died: 1937 (aged 63–64) Serres, Kingdom of Greece
- Allegiance: Kingdom of Greece
- Branch: Hellenic Army
- Service years: 1905–1908; 1912–1913
- Conflicts: Macedonian Struggle; Balkan Wars; First Balkan War; Second Balkan War

Theodoros I. Boulasikis (Greek: Θεόδωρος Ι. Μπουλασίκης; 1873 – 1937) was a Greek chieftain of the Macedonian Struggle from Serres.

== Biography ==
Theodoros Boulasikis was born in 1873 in Serres. In 1905, he enlisted in the force of Doukas Gaitatzis, which acted in the area around Serres, while he was also a member of the "Orpheas" society, a local undercover center of support of the Greek Macedonian Struggle, posing as an organiser of musical and athletic events.

He initially fought as a rifleman in the areas of Serres, Bisaltia, Fyllida and Pangaion. In 1907, he was put in command of his group, which fought in Fyllida and Pangaion, rallying the Greeks living in the countryside. In the beginning of 1908, he fought in Zihni as the commander of a small group of six guerrillas.

In 1908, after the general amnesty issued after the Young Turk Revolution, he went to Serres, along with other local chieftains, where he gave up his arms and disbanded his forces, in a celebratory manner, cheered on by the crowd.

He took up arms again during the Balkan Wars and especially during the Second Balkan War, when he together with Doukas raised a force of locals, in order to prevent the occupation of Greek villages by Bulgarian forces.

Boulasikis spent the rest of his life in Serres, leading a simple life.

He died in 1937.

== Sources ==
- Hellenic Army General Staff, Army History Management, The Macedonian Struggle and the events in Thrace, Athens 1979.
- Ioannis S. Koliopoulos (scientific editing), Obscure, native Macedonian fighters, Society for Macedonian Studies, University Studio Press, Thessaloniki, 2008.
- Pavlos L. Tsamis, Macedonian Struggle, Society for Macedonian Studies, Thessaloniki 1975.
- Nikolaos Chr. Christidis, The roads of Serres & the nomenclature, Serres 2012.
