= Sintian =

Sintian may refer to:

- The Sintians, an ancient Thracian people
- Sindian, Xindian, in Taiwan, and Sintian Mountain in Taiwan
