= Sidirokastro =

Sidirokastro Σιδηρόκαστρο
- Municipal unit
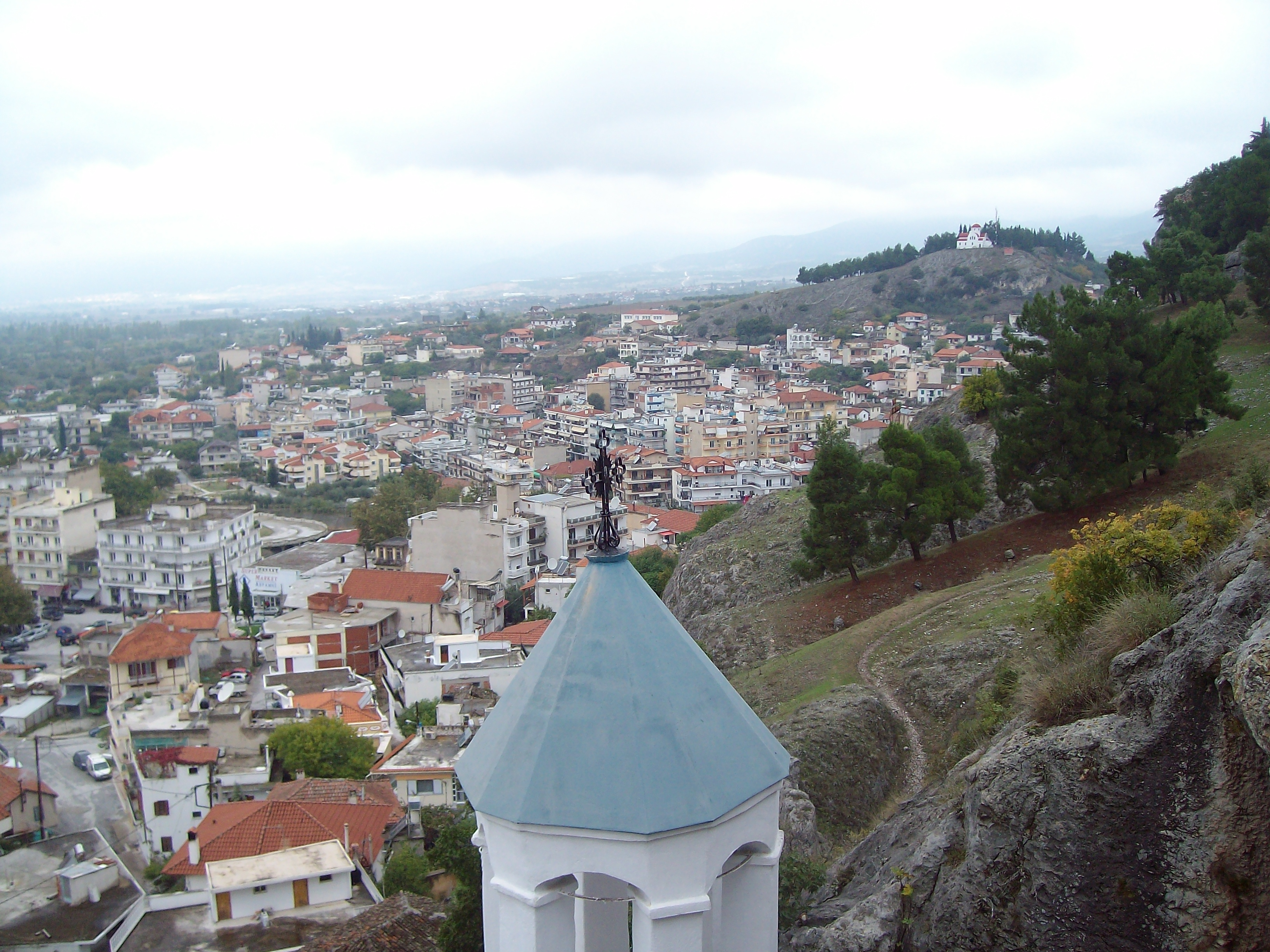
- General view of Sidirokastro

- Location within the regional unit

- Location within Greece
- Coordinates: 41°14′N 23°23′E
- Country: Greece
- Administrative region: Central Macedonia
- Regional unit: Serres
- Municipality: Sintiki

Area
  - Municipal unit: 196.6 km^{2} (75.9 sq mi)

Population (2021)
  - Municipal unit: 7,937
  - Municipal unit density: 40.37/km^{2} (104.6/sq mi)
  - Community: 5,181
- Time zone: UTC+2 (EET)
  - Summer (DST): UTC+3 (EEST)
- Vehicle registration: ΕΡ

Sidirokastro (Greek: Σιδηρόκαστρο; Ser-Drama-Lagadin-Nevrokop dialect: Βαλοβίστα, Валовища, Valovishta) is a town and a former municipality in the Serres regional unit, Greece. Since the 2011 local government reform it is part of the municipality Sintiki, of which it is the seat and a municipal unit. It is built near the fertile valley of the river Strymonas, on the bank of the Krousovitis River. It has a number of tourist sights, such as the medieval stone castle, Byzantine ruins, and natural spas.

== General information ==
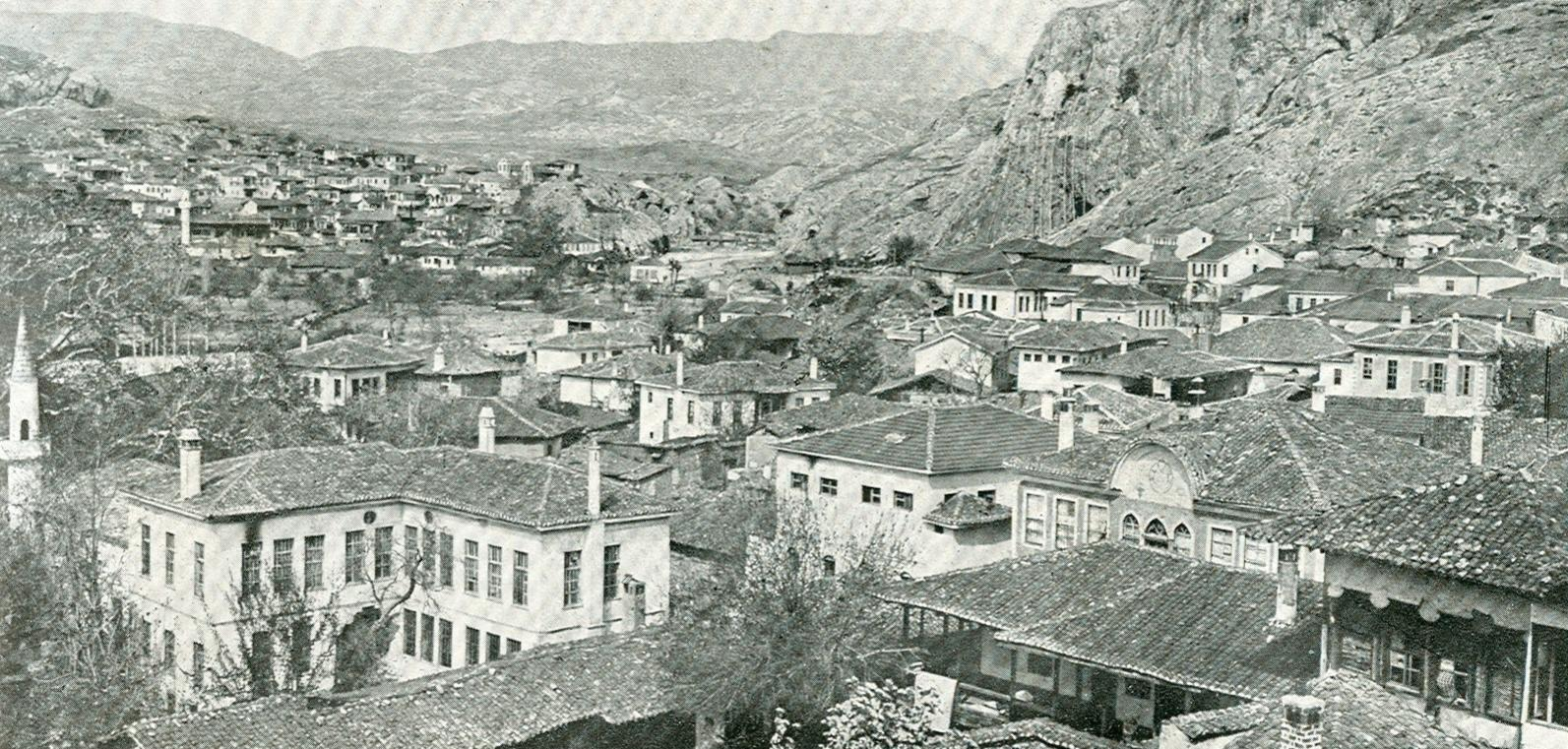
View of the town, 1919

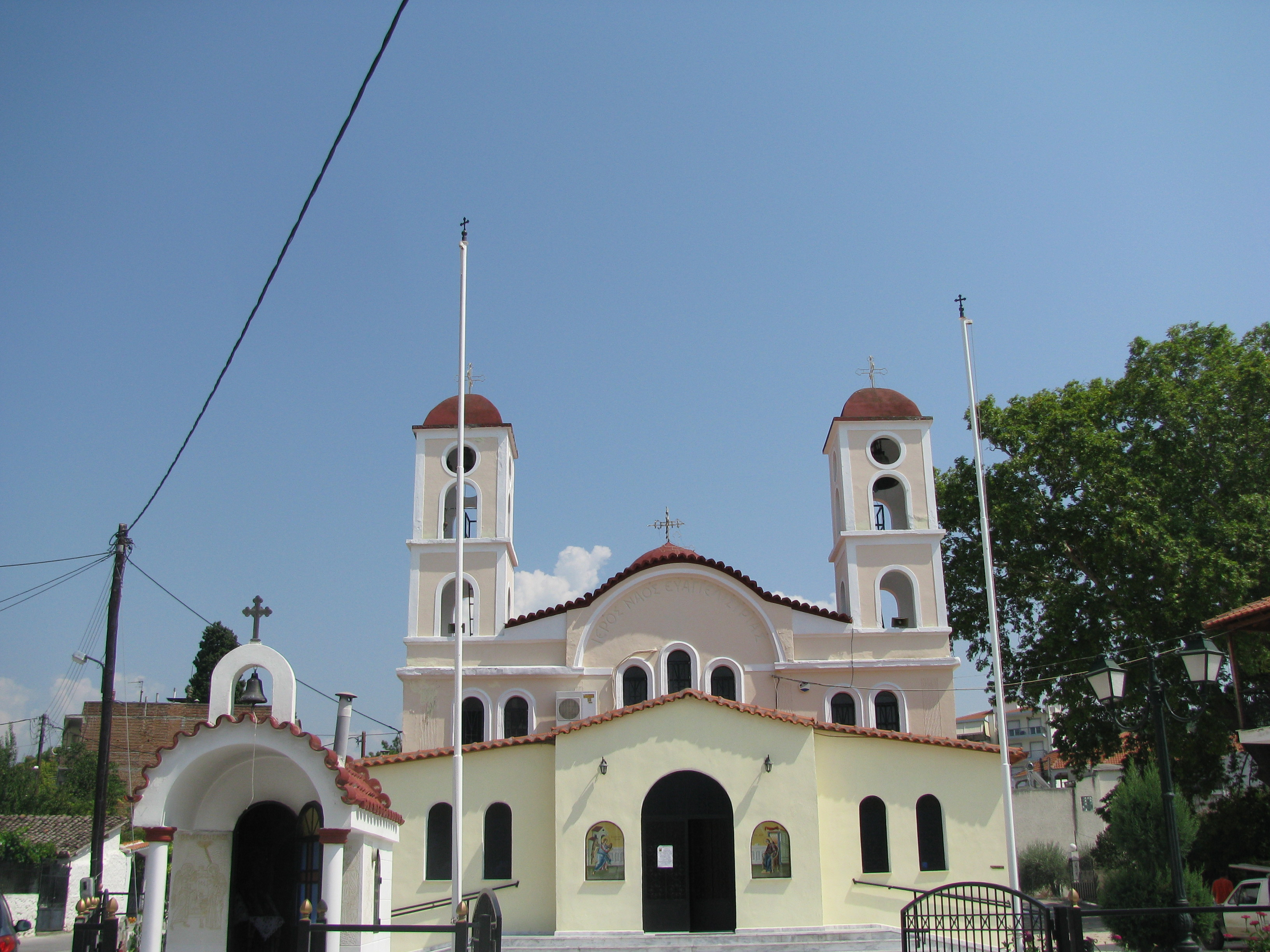
Theotokos church

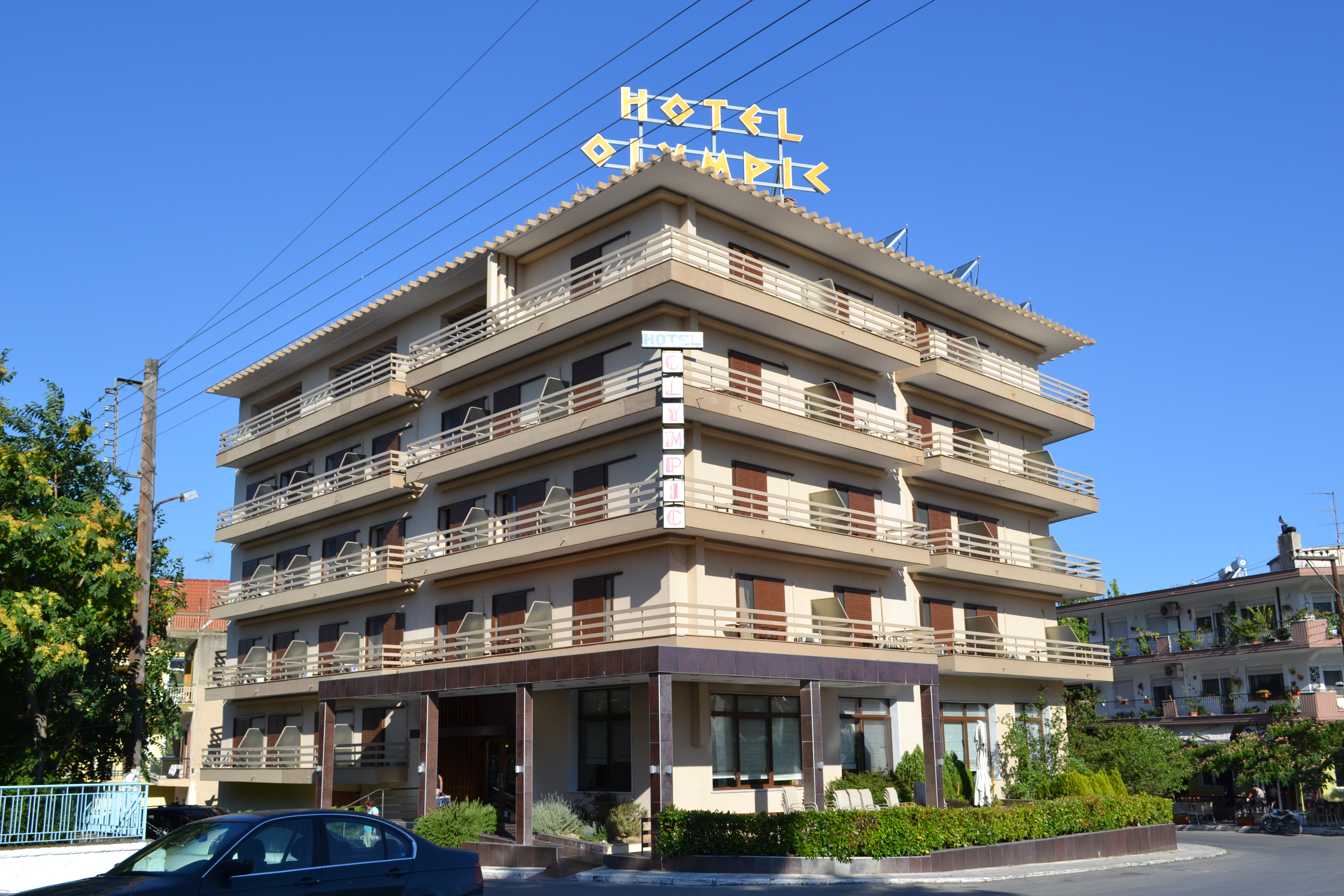
Hotel Olympic

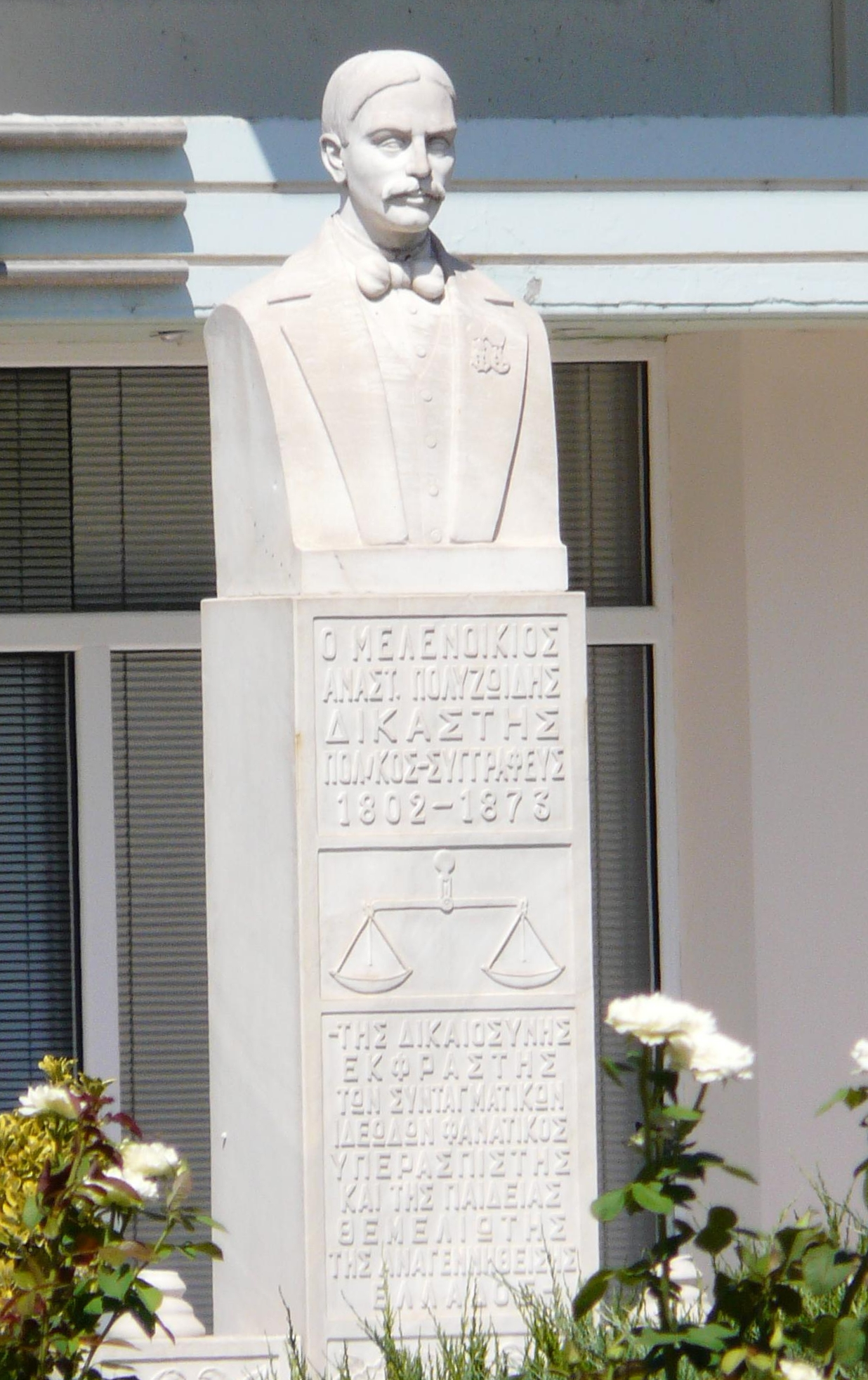
A bust of Anastasios Polyzoidis

Sidirokastro is located 25 km to the northwest of the town of Serres, between the Vrontous and Angistro mountains (to the north) and the river Strymonas (to the west). The 2021 census recorded 7,937 residents in the municipal unit of Sidirokastro, while there were 5,181 residents recorded in the community of Sidirokastro. The municipal unit has an area of 196.554 km^{2}. The town is crossed by the Krousovitis River, one of the Strymonas' tributaries, which divides the town into two sections. These sections are connected by two bridges: Stavrou and Kalkani. The landscape is made even prettier thanks to the Maimouda rivulet and its miniature bridges. Sidirokastro's population is a blend of indigenous people and descendants of the early 20th century waves of refugees from Asia Minor (people who sought asylum in Greece from the wars and conflicts of that period). Sidirokastro took in refugees from Melnik in 1913; from East Thrace (European Turkey) after the 1922 onslaught that followed the Greco-Turkish Wars in Asia Minor; from Pontus, Vlachs and people from all over Greece.

== History ==
Sidirokastro's history reaches a long way back in time. There are Palaeolithic ruins here, and references to the area are found in Homer and Herodotus. Its ancient inhabitants migrated to Sidirokastro from the island of Limnos. The area's first inhabitants were of the Sintian tribe, after which Sintiki Province is named. On September 20, 1383, Sidirokastro was overtaken by Ottoman forces and remained under their rule for 529 years. In the Ottoman tax registry of 1519 (Hijri 925), it was recorded as Temür-Hisar, and the town had 122 Muslim and 205 Christian households, along with 33 Muslim and 27 Christian bachelors; it was a hass of Piri Mehmed Pasha. The Ottoman name was later changed to Demir Hisar (also called Timurhisar). Demirhisar was a kaza centre in the Sanjak of Serres before the Balkan Wars. According to the statistics of geographer Dimitri Mishev (D.M. Brancoff), the town had a total Christian population of 1,535 people in 1905, consisting of 864 Bulgarian Patriarchist Grecomans, 245 Greek Christians, 240 Aromanians, 162 Romani, and 24 Exarchist Bulgarians.

In 1912, Sidirokastro was captured by the Bulgarians under general Georgi Todorov, but some months later it came under Greek control when the Balkan Wars ended. In 1915, during World War I, it came under the control of the Central Powers (especially Bulgaria), but it remained part of the Greek state when the war ended (1918). In April 1941, after the surrender of the Roupel fortress and the German army's invasion of Greece, the Bulgarian army occupied Sidirokastro, as part of the triple Axis Occupation of Greece. The Bulgarians left in 1944 with the rest of the retreating Axis powers.

== Transportation ==
=== Road ===
Sidirokastro is situated on the European route E79; the main road from northern Greece (Thessaloniki) to Bulgaria.

=== Rail ===
The Thessaloniki–Alexandroupolis railway passes to the southwest of the settlement (though not within the town limits). The Sidirokastro railway station sits 1.5 kilometres (0.93 mi) from the town centre. As of 2021, it is unstaffed and in a state of dilapidation.

== Sights ==
- There are a number of sights to be found in Sidirokastro, such as the ruins of the Byzantine castle, the Agios Dimitrios church that is carved in rock, and the bridges over the Krousovitis River.
- The Issari Fort, built by Emperor Basil II. Standing 155 metres tall, it towers over the town's northwest side. The town owes its name to this fort: "Sidirokastro" means "iron castle" in Greek, as does "Demir Hisar" in Turkish.
- The wetland habitat of the artificial Lake Kerkini, created by a dam on the Strymon River. This singular habitat, protected by the Ramsar Convention on Wetlands, is Greece's natural frontier with Bulgaria. It is one of the richest fowl habitats in Greece: home to more than 300 species.
- The Sidirokastro Hot Springs have a temperature of 45 °C. They are just outside the town to the north, near the Strymon River railway-bridge, on a hill that has views of the area. Thousands of people go to these hot springs every year, both for recreation or therapy. There are more hot springs in Thermes and in Angistro.
- The town's greatest annual festival is on 27 June, celebrating the area's liberation from Ottoman rule in 1913.
- Mihalis Tsartsidis Folklore and History Museum

== Notable natives ==
- Georgios Katsanis, Greek war hero from Turkish invasion of Cyprus in 1974
- Georgi Vasilev (Георги Василев), Bulgarian football player, striker
- Ioannis Tsintsaris, Greek weightlifter
- Nikolaos Gousios, Greek chieftain of the Macedonian Struggle
- Sotiris Konstantinidis, Greek footballer
