= Strymonas railway station =

Railway station in Greece

Σταθμός Strymonas
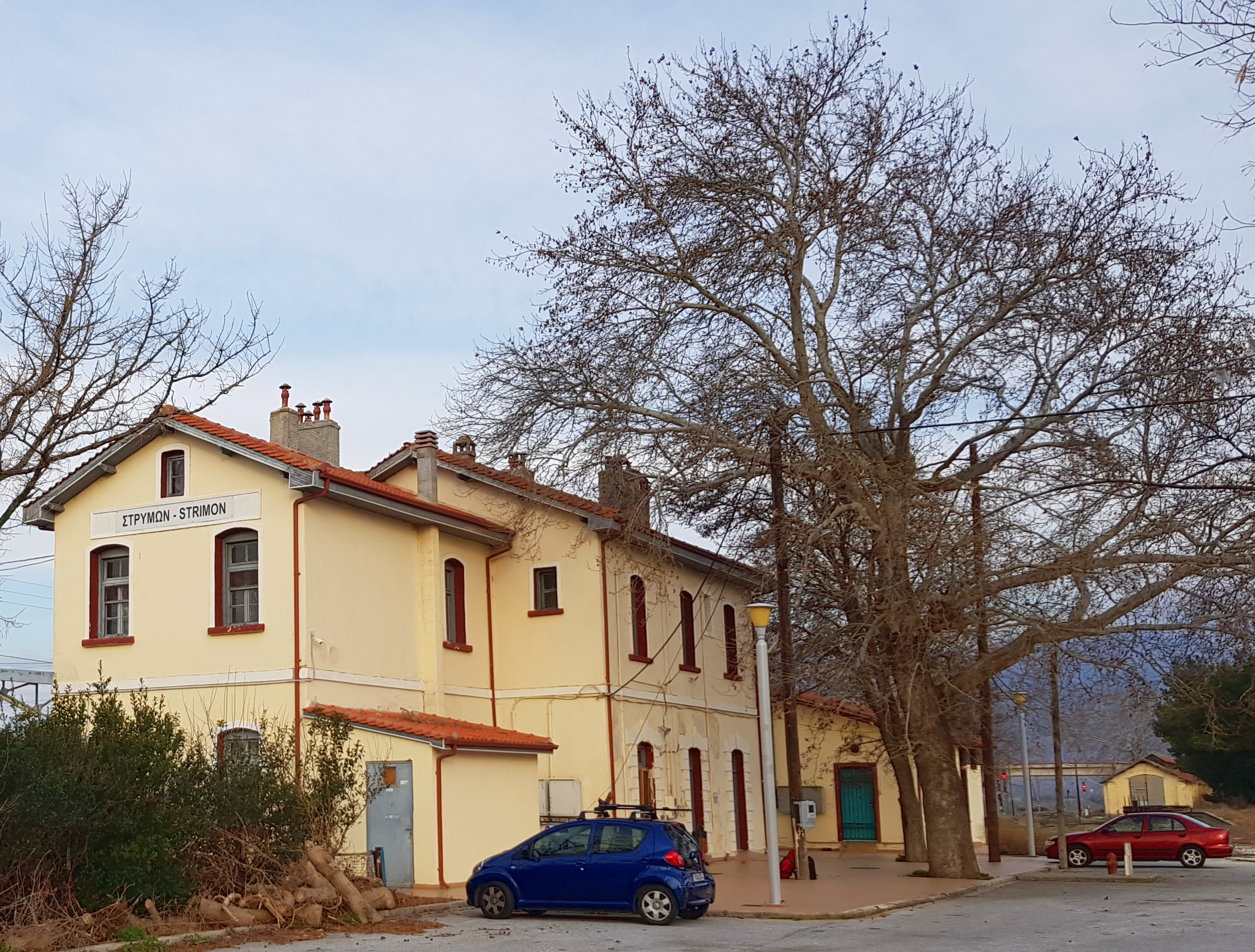
- Strymonas railway station buildings and forecourt, March 2020

General information
- Location: 623 00, Greece; Serres; Greece
- Coordinates: 41°15′44″N 23°20′43″E
- Owner: GAIAOSE
- Lines: Strymon-Kulata railway, Thessaloniki–Alexandroupoli railway
- Platforms: 4
- Tracks: 5 (1 siding)
- Train operators: Hellenic Train

Construction
- Structure type: at-grade
- Depth: 1
- Platform levels: 1
- Parking: Yes
- Cycle facilities: No

Other information
- Status: Staffed (as of 2019)
- Website: http://www.ose.gr/en/

History
- Opened: 1896
- Electrified: No
- Original company: Société du Chemin de Fer Ottoman Jonction Salonique-Constantinople (JSC)

Services
Preceding station	Regional Rail	Following station
Neo Petritsi towards Thessaloniki	Line T3	Sidirokastro towards Drama
Suspended services
Preceding station	Hellenic Train	Following station
Neo Petritsi towards Thessaloniki	InterCity Thessaloniki–Alexandroupoli	Sidirokastro towards Alexandroupoli
Neo Petritsi towards Thessaloniki	InterCity Thessaloniki–Serres	Sidirokastro towards Serres
Thessaloniki Terminus	Thessaloniki-Sofia Express	Kulata towards Sofia
Location
- Location within Greece

Strymonas railway station (Greek: Σιδηροδρομικός Σταθμός Στρυμώνα, romanized: Sidirodromikós stathmós Strymona) is a railway station that servers the former municipality Strymonas, and the nearby settlement of Charopo in Serres in Central Macedonia, Greece. The station is located just west of the settlement 2.9 kilometres (1.8 mi) (39 Min walk). The neoclassical station building (as of 2021) is unstaffed.

== History ==
The station opened in 1896 on what was the Société du Chemin de Fer Ottoman Jonction Salonique-Constantinople (JSC), built to connect Thessaloniki and Alexandroupoli, a year after the line was completed. In 1896 the company inaugurated the line thus connecting Thessaloniki with Dedeagac (Alexandroupolis), and consequently with Istanbul. During this period, Northern Greece and the southern Balkans were still under Ottoman rule. The area was annexed by Greece on 18 October 1912 during the First Balkan War. During World War I, it came under the control of Bulgaria, but it became part of the Greek state again when the war ended in 1918. On 17 October 1925, the Greek government purchased the Greek sections of the former JSC, and the railway became part of the Hellenic State Railways. In April 1941, after the surrender of the Roupel fortress and the German invasion of Greece, the Bulgarian army occupied the area as part of the triple Axis Occupation of Greece. The Bulgarians left in 1944 with the rest of the retreating Axis powers. In 1970 OSE became the legal successor to the SEK, taking over responsibilities for most of Greece's rail infrastructure. On 1 January 1971, the station and most of the Greek rail infrastructure was transferred to the Hellenic Railways Organisation S.A., a state-owned corporation. Freight traffic declined sharply when the state-imposed monopoly of OSE for the transport of agricultural products and fertilisers ended in the early 1990s. Many small stations of the network with little passenger traffic were closed down. In 2005 the station building closed (with the station downgraded to that of a holt) and was left abandoned. In 2009, with the Greek debt crisis unfolding OSE's Management was forced to reduce services across the network. Timetables were cut back, routes closed, and stations left abandoned as the government-run entity attempted to reduce overheads. Services from Thessaloniki and Alexandroupolis were cut back from six to just two trains a day, reducing the reliability of services and passenger numbers. In May 2017, all Sofia bound through services on the Strymon-Koulatas line were suspended, with a rail replacement bus service to Koulata, from which passengers board trains for Sofia. In 2017 OSE's passenger transport sector was privatised as TrainOSE, currently a wholly owned subsidiary of Ferrovie dello Stato Italiane infrastructure, including stations, remained under the control of OSE.

In August 2025, the Greek Ministry of Infrastructure and Transport confirmed the creation of a new body, Greek Railways (Greek: Σιδηρόδρομοι Ελλάδος, romanized: Ellinikí Sidiródromi Monoprósopi) to assume responsibility for rail infrastructure, planning, modernisation projects, and rolling stock across Greece. Previously, these functions were divided among several state-owned entities: OSE, which managed infrastructure; ERGOSÉ, responsible for modernisation projects; and GAIAOSÉ, which owned stations, buildings, and rolling stock. OSE had overseen both infrastructure and operations until its vertical separation in 2005. Rail safety has been identified as a key priority. The merger follows the July approval of a Parliamentary Bill to restructure the national railway system, a direct response to the Tempi accident of February 2023, in which 43 people died after a head-on collision.

== Facilities ==
The station's original 19th-century brick-built station is closed As of (2021) the station is unstaffed, with the booking office closed; however, there are waiting rooms. Access to the platforms is via the lines; though passengers can walk across the rails, it is not wheelchair accessible. Only Platform 1 has shelters with seating. None of the platforms has Dot-matrix display departure and arrival screens or timetable poster boards on the platforms; as a result, the station is currently little more than an unstaffed halt. The station still has its water tower and sidings; however, these are no longer regularly used. The station, however, does Parking in the forecourt, and infrequent buses do call at the station.

== Services ==
As of 12 May 2025, Line 3 of the Thessaloniki Regional Railway calls at this station: service is currently limited, with two trains per day to Thessaloniki (trains 1635 and 3633), one train per day to Serres (3632), and one train per day to Drama (1634, via Serres).

It was also served by two long-distance trains between Thessaloniki and Alexandroupolis, but the service is currently suspended: the cross-border train from Strymonas to Kulata in Bulgaria is also suspended and operated by a rail replacement bus service.

The station is also served by local and regional buses.

== Station layout ==
L Ground/Concourse	Customer service	Tickets/Exits
Level; Ε1
Level; Ε1	Side platform, doors on the right/left
Level; Ε1	Platform 1	In non-regular use
Level; Ε1	Island platform, doors on the right/left
Level; Ε1	Platform 2	towards Thessaloniki (Neo Petritsi) →
Level; Ε1	Island platform, doors on the right/left
Level; Ε1	Platform 3	towards Alexandroupoli (Sidirokastro) ←

== Gallery ==
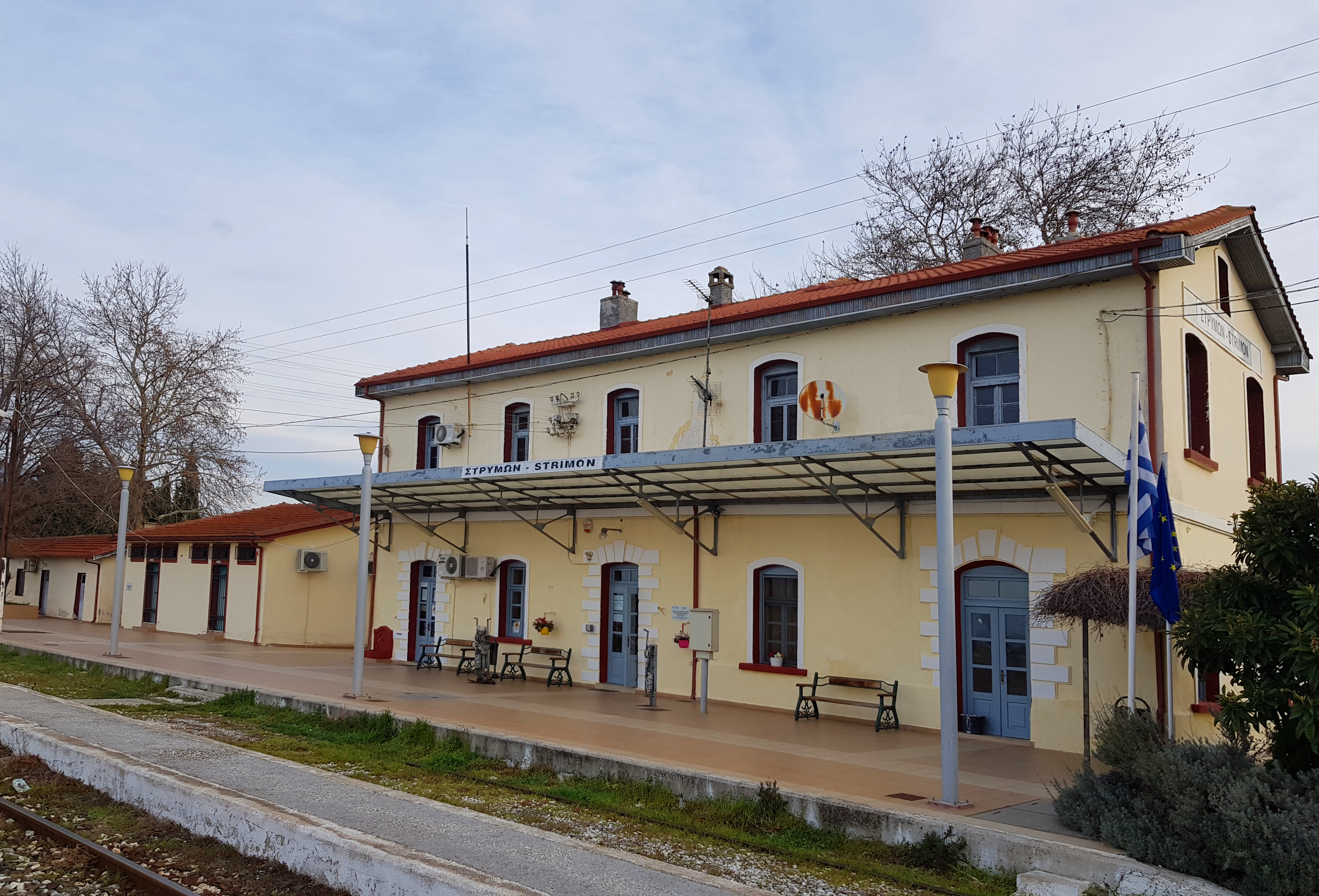
Strymonas railway station trackside, March 2020.

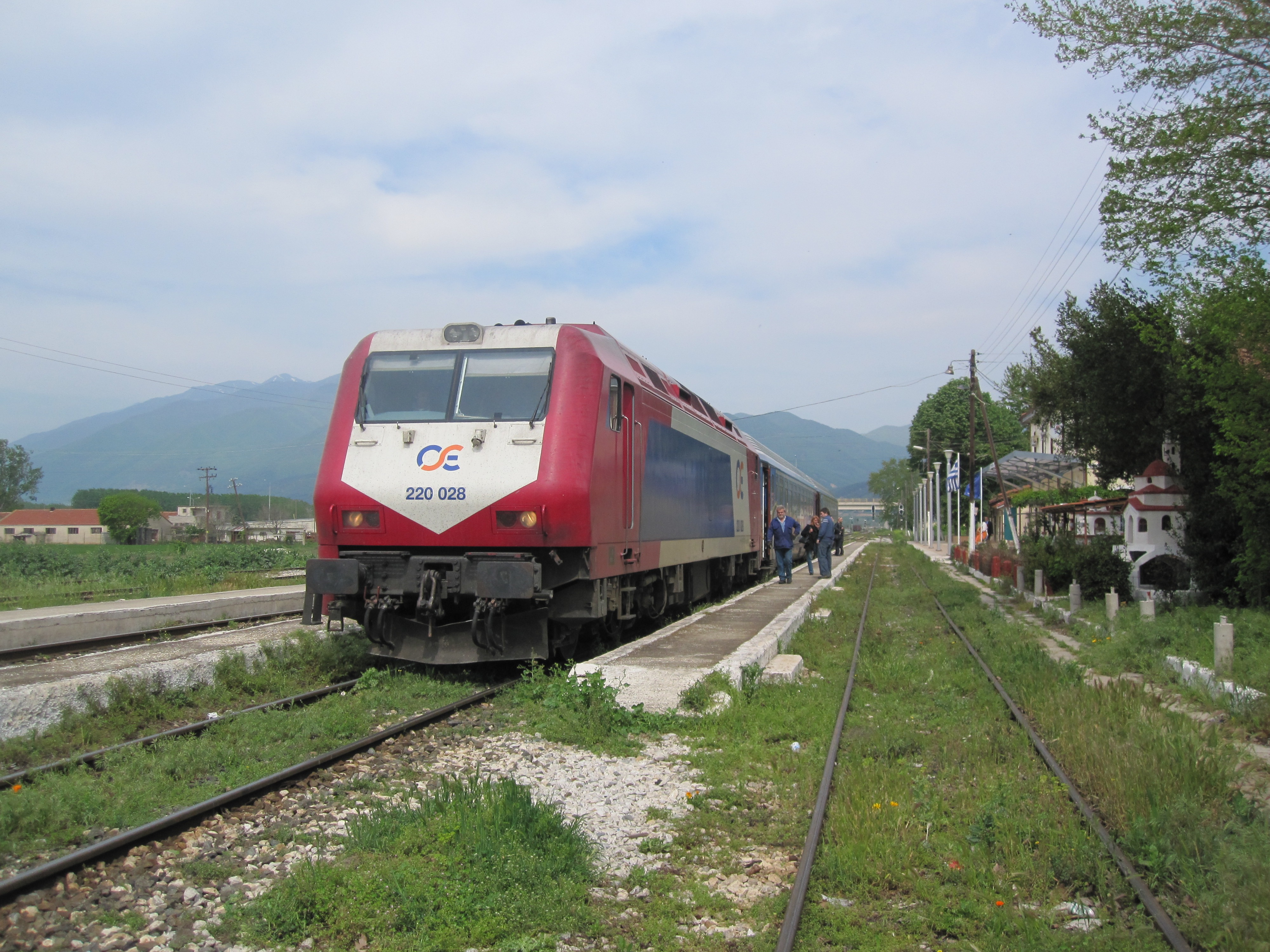
A Thessaloniki bound class A471 at Strymonas railway station, April 2010.

== See also ==
- Greek railway stations
- Railways of Greece
- Hellenic Railways Organization
- Hellenic Train
