= Michalis Tsartsidis Folklore and History Museum =

Museum in Sidirokastro, Greece

Coordinates: 41.2355°N 23.3907°E

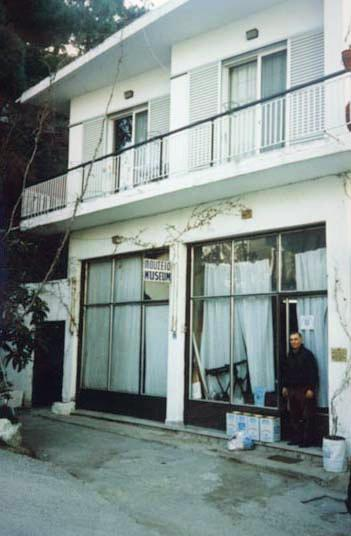
View from outside

The Michalis Tsartsidis Folklore and History Museum is a museum in Sidirokastro, Central Macedonia, Greece, 85 km from Thessaloniki and 25 km from Serres. The museum was opened in 1979, and was set up as a private initiative in order to showcase the numerous aspects of the personal collection of Michalis Tsartsidis. The collection is divided into two parts, military and folklore.

The owner of the collection started collecting weapons and military memorabilia in 1941, and it has now grown into a large collection of weapons dating from the Balkan Wars and the First and Second World Wars. Apart from a broad assortment of rifles, revolvers, and pistols, visitors can also see German bombs from World War II, cartridge belts, helmets, knapsacks, photographs of the battle of Rupel Fortress, letters stored by Greek fighters in their rifle barrels, the flag of the headquarters of the Greek Army in the Middle East, German propaganda posters, and a piece of soap made from human fat (a Jewish victim of the Holocaust). A rare piece, in both conception and execution, is a rifle disguised as a walking stick, which was used for secret executions. The most recent exhibits are Serbian Army helmets with holes in them, proof of the execution in cold blood of Serb soldiers by UÇK fighters.

The folklore section of the collection seeks not to recreate the traditional way of life, but to preserve and display some rare and not-so-rare tools, costumes, and objects that were used in times gone by. Of particular interest are three bellows used by a blacksmith, a coppersmith and a confectioner, moulds for cast iron, moulds for bricks, wooden safety locks, and various tools of destruction.

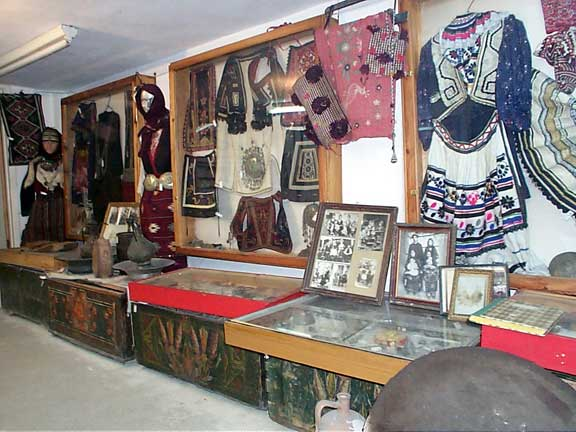
Part of the folklore section

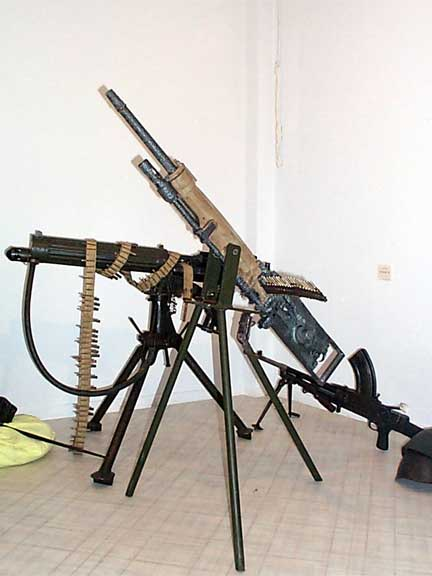
Machine gun of the Greek army

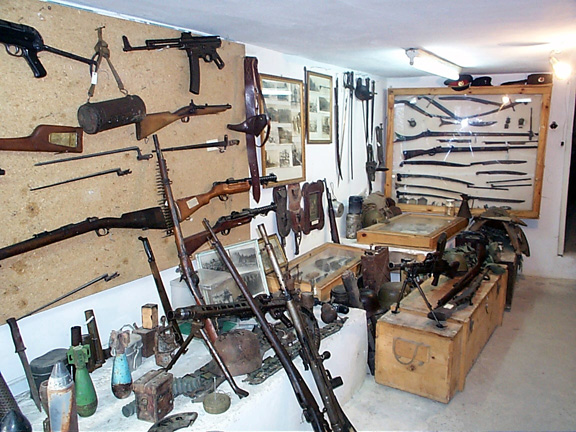
Part of large collection of weapons

== Sources ==
- This article incorporates text from the corresponding article at the Museums of Macedonia website, commissioned by the Macedonian Heritage foundation, written by Vlasis Vlasidis, and published under a CC-BY-SA-3.0 license.
