= Vyroneia railway station =

Railway station in Greece

Βυρώνεια Vyroneia
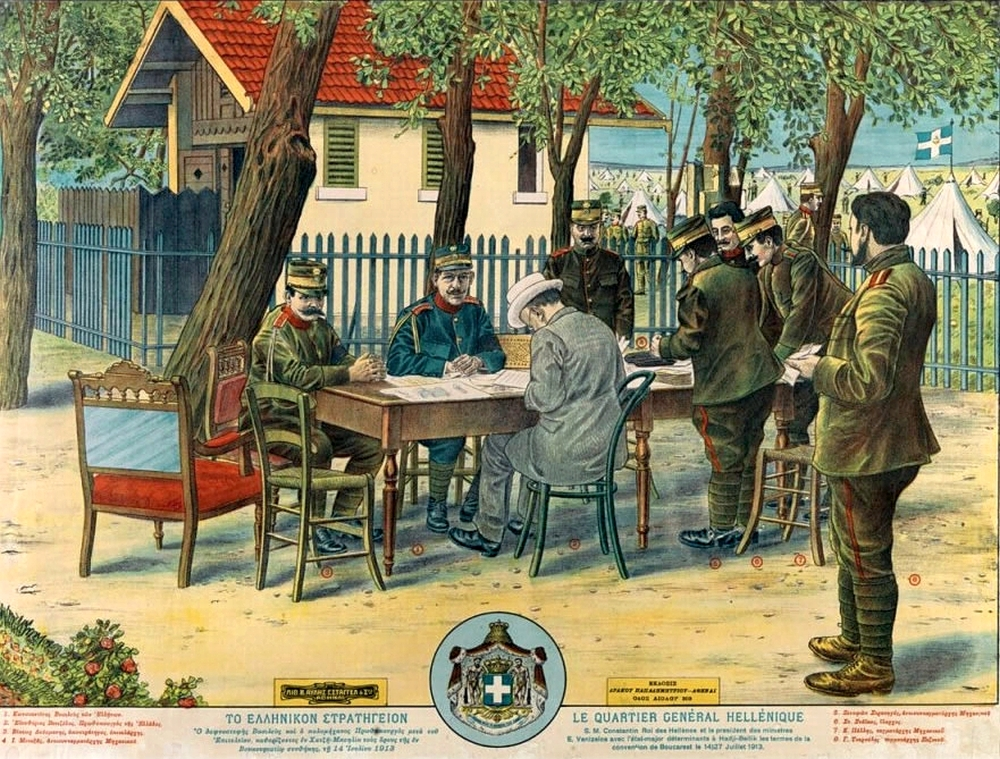
- The Greek GHQ at Vyroneia (Hadji-Beylik), with King Constantine I and Prime Minister Eleftherios Venizelos deliberating before the Congress of Bucharest Vyroneia, then known as Hadji-Beylik, was a military base for the Greek army during the Second Balkan War.

General information
- Location: 620 43, Serres; Greece
- Coordinates: 41°09′16″N 23°09′06″E
- Owner: GAIAOSE
- Line: Thessaloniki–Alexandroupolis railway
- Platforms: 2
- Tracks: 2
- Train operators: Hellenic Train
- Connections: Proastiakos

Construction
- Structure type: at-grade
- Depth: 1
- Platform levels: 1
- Parking: Yes
- Cycle facilities: Yes

Other information
- Status: Unstaffed
- Website: http://www.ose.gr/en/

History
- Opened: 1896
- Closed: 2005 (Station building)
- Electrified: No
- Former names: Chatzi Beilik

Services
Preceding station	Regional Rail	Following station
Omalo towards Thessaloniki	Line T3	Neo Petritsi towards Drama
Suspended services
Preceding station	Hellenic Train	Following station
Livadi Kerkinis towards Thessaloniki	InterCity Thessaloniki–Alexandroupoli Fast train	Neo Petritsi towards Alexandroupoli
Omalo towards Thessaloniki	InterCity Thessaloniki–Alexandroupoli	Neo Petritsi towards Alexandroupoli
Omalo towards Thessaloniki	InterCity Thessaloniki–Serres	Neo Petritsi towards Serres
Location
- Location within Greece

Vyroneia railway station (Greek: Σιδηροδρομικός Σταθμός Βυρώνεια, romanized: Sidirodromikós stathmós Sèrres) is a railway station that servers the community of Vyroneia, in Serres in Central Macedonia, Greece. The station is located just east of the settlement but still within the settlement limits. The station is unstaffed, with the station building now housing a restaurant.

== History ==
The station opened in 1896, the station was known before 1924: Χατζή Μπεηλίκ - Chatzi Beilik Vyroneia was annexed by Greece on 18 October 1912 during the First Balkan War. In the summer (July–August) of 1913, during the final phase of the Second Balkan War. The small station was turned into the headquarters of the Greek army. Here the then King Constantine and Eleftherios Venizelos signed the truce with Lieutenant General Victor Dusmanis and the Bulgaria, leading to Bucharest Treaty that end the war. An inscription marks the occasion in the station's yard. On 17 October 1925 The Greek government purchased the Greek sections of the former Salonica Monastir railway, and the railway became part of the Hellenic State Railways, with the remaining section north of Florina seeded to Yugoslavia. On 20 August 1944, during the German Occupation, a German guard was attacked by ELAS forces.

In 1970, OSE became the legal successor to the SEK, taking over responsibilities for most of Greece's rail infrastructure. On 1 January 1971, the station and most of the Greek rail infrastructure where transferred to the Hellenic Railways Organisation S.A., a state-owned corporation. Freight traffic declined sharply when the state-imposed monopoly of OSE for the transport of agricultural products and fertilisers ended in the early 1990s. Many small stations of the network with little passenger traffic were closed down. In 2005 the station building closed (with the station downgraded to that of a holt) and was left abandoned. In 2009, with the Greek debt crisis unfolding OSE's Management was forced to reduce services across the network. Timetables were cutback, routes closed and stations left abandoned as the government-run entity attempted to reduce overheads. Services from Thessaloniki and Alexandroupolis were cut back from six to just two trains a day, reducing the reliability of services and passenger numbers. Close to ruin and in danger of collapse in December 2013, the building was renovated and opened as "ouzo cafe" or "Border Station" restaurant. In 2017 OSE's passenger transport sector was privatised as TrainOSE, currently, a wholly owned subsidiary of Ferrovie dello Stato Italiane infrastructure, including stations, remained under the control of OSE. Platform 1 now houses a small antique railcar.

In August 2025, the Greek Ministry of Infrastructure and Transport confirmed the creation of a new body, Greek Railways (Greek: Σιδηρόδρομοι Ελλάδος, romanized: Ellinikí Sidiródromi Monoprósopi) to assume responsibility for rail infrastructure, planning, modernisation projects, and rolling stock across Greece. Previously, these functions were divided among several state-owned entities: OSE, which managed infrastructure; ERGOSÉ, responsible for modernisation projects; and GAIAOSÉ, which owned stations, buildings, and rolling stock. OSE had overseen both infrastructure and operations until its vertical separation in 2005. Rail safety has been identified as a key priority. The merger follows the July approval of a Parliamentary Bill to restructure the national railway system, a direct response to the Tempi accident of February 2023, in which 43 people died after a head-on collision.

== Facilities ==
The station's original 19th-century brick-built station is now a restaurant, with the station office converted into a small grocery store selling local and traditional delicacies. As a result, the station is unstaffed, with no staffed booking office or waiting rooms. There is no footbridge over the lines, though passengers can walk across the rails; it is however not wheelchair accessible. There are no digital display screens or timetable poster boards; as a result, the station is currently little more than an unstaffed halt. However the building is well kept. Frequent buses do call at the station.

== Services ==
As of 12 May 2025, Line 3 of the Thessaloniki Regional Railway calls at this station: service is currently limited, with two trains per day to Thessaloniki (trains 1635 and 3633), one train per day to Serres (3632), and one train per day to Drama (1634, via Serres).

It was also served by two long-distance trains between Thessaloniki and Alexandroupolis, but the service is currently suspended.

== The Tree ==
Today, in the station's yard stands a huge plane tree with an inscription that records the events of July 1913.
