= Agkistro =

Agkistro Άγκιστρο
- Municipal unit
- Location within the regional unit

- Location within Greece
- Coordinates: 41°23′N 23°45′E
- Country: Greece
- Administrative region: Central Macedonia
- Regional unit: Serres
- Municipality: Sintiki

Area
  - Municipal unit: 70.9 km^{2} (27.4 sq mi)

Population (2021)
  - Municipal unit: 350
  - Municipal unit density: 4.9/km^{2} (13/sq mi)
- Time zone: UTC+2 (EET)
  - Summer (DST): UTC+3 (EEST)
- Vehicle registration: ΕΡ

Agkistro or alternatively Agistro (Greek: Άγκιστρο, pronounced [ˈaɟistɾo]), is a village in the Serres regional unit, Greece. The village is part of the municipality of Sintiki and hosts a population of 350, according to the 2021 census. The municipal unit has an area of 70.937 km^{2}. Agistro lies near the Greek-Bulgarian border and 10 km from the border crossing of Promachonas. The village main tourist attraction is its steam bath complex, which dates from the Byzantine period.

== History ==
The gold and silver mines found in the mountain of Agkistro, south of the modern village, are believed to have provided valuable material to the armies of Ancient Macedon and especially to the campaign of Alexander the Great, during the 4th century BC, although in archaeological bibliography the specific location has not been identified as one of the ancient mining sites. The steam bath complex and tower in the village center were erected during the Byzantine period, ca. 950 AD. The latter was later converted into a 20 m high clock tower, possibly during the reign of Emperor Andronikos III Palaiologos (1328–1341).

During Ottoman times the village was known as Tsigkeli (Turkish: Çengel), while the baths were modified for use by the local Ottoman lord and his harem. Additionally the clock tower was used as a jail and place of executions. In a survey of 1877 by the French professor A. Synvet, the village was home to 200 Greeks; while in a survey of 1905, by the Secretary General of the Bulgarian Exarchate (Bulgarian: Сенгелово, Sengelovo), who expressed the Bulgarian point of view, the village was inhabited by 1,536 Bulgarians and had a Bulgarian school, which is also confirmed by a map by the Italian Institute Geografico de Agostini of the Christian schools in Macedonia. When the Balkan Wars ended in 1913, the Greek-Bulgarian border was drawn a few metres north of the village. In the years that followed, due to tensions in Greek-Bulgarian relations, the village was to be found within a military zone.

In 1920 the local population was 965. In 1923 a number of refugees arrived from the Pontus region, as part of the population exchange between Greece and Turkey, resulting in a population increase (1,240 in 1928). South of the village lies Rupel Fort, which was part of the Greek line of defense that withstood the German invasion in the spring of 1941, during World War II.

Agkistro formed a separate community, but during the local government reforms of 2011 it was incorporated within the Sintiki municipality, of which it is a municipal unit.

== Tourist Attractions ==
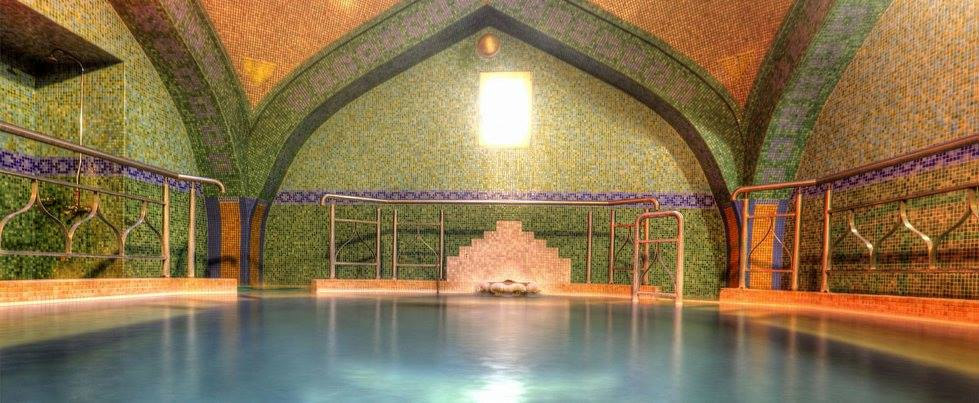
Agkistro Byzantine bath.

Despite its distance from main cities (or because of its location on the borderline), around 100,000 tourists visit Agkistro on an annual basis. Despite the general financial crisis in Greece, there is no local unemployment, with over thirty businesses catering to the tourist industry. The main attraction is the Byzantine spa complex which has been recently renovated. The complex has seven bath tubs, of which the oldest one dates to 950 A.D. It is open all year round, 7 days a week, 24 hours a day. The accessibility is one of the main positive factors, as people can enjoy an entire weekend on the premises. The temperature of the water is between 35 and 39 °C and its quality is hypotonic, slightly radioactive, suitable for curing rheumatism and arthritis.

In Fort Roupel, which is today a war museum, memorial celebrations are held each year on the 6th of April.
