= Parthicopolis =

Coordinates: 41°33′54″N 23°16′47″E

Parthicopolis (Ancient Greek: Παρθικόπολις) was an ancient city in Sintice region in ancient Thrace and later Macedon. During Byzantine times it was a bishopric seat. Its site is located near modern Sandanski, Bulgaria.

== History ==
The city was probably founded during the Roman Empire and named to commemorate a victory over the Parthian Empire, most likely the Parthian campaign of Emperor Trajan in AD 113. It may have been intended as a replacement for Alexandropolis Maedica, which had ceased to exist by the Roman Imperial period.

A letter written to the city by Emperor Antoninus Pius in AD 158, which was inscribed on stone, survives. It deals with issues that had arisen in the process of establishing the new city, namely the jurisdiction of the town's courts over people who were not citizens of the community, the right of the town to charge a poll tax in addition to the provincial tax, the number of members on the town council, and the amount that council members had to pay on appointment (a summa honoraria). The document is important for understanding the relationship between Roman citizenship and local citizenships under the Roman empire. It suggests a movement towards giving jurisdiction to the town where the dispute arose, rather than requiring disputes to be remitted to the defendant's town of origin (the older practice).

The town is mentioned by Ptolemy as being in Sintice, a part of Macedonia, as well as by Phlegon of Tralles, Hierocles, and Constantine Porphyrogenitus. The latter locates it in Thrace. Ptolemy's text refers to the town as "Paroecopolis" (Ancient Greek: Παροικόπολις), but this is a copyist's error.

A town named Pathenopolis, mentioned by Stephanus Byzantius, Pliny, and Eutropius has been identified with Parthicopolis, but this appears to be incorrect, since that city was located on the shore of the Black Sea between Callatis and Tomis.

== Ecclesiastical history ==
Its bishop, Jonas or John, assisted at the Council of Sardica (342 or 343); at the Council of Chalcedon (451) there was present John "Parthicopolis primæ Macedoniae". That suggests it was in Macedonia Prima and hence a suffragan of its capital Thessalonica's Metropolitan Archbishopric.

This see is not mentioned in any of the Greek Notitiae episcopatuum, so it probably was not an important city.
