= Sidirokastro railway station =

Railway Station in Thrace, Greece

Σιδηρόκαστρο Sidirokastro

General information
- Location: Sidirokastro 623 00, Serres; Greece
- Coordinates: 41°13′45″N 23°22′33″E
- Owner: GAIAOSE
- Line: Thessaloniki–Alexandroupolis railway
- Platforms: 3
- Tracks: 6
- Train operators: Hellenic Train
- Connections: Proastiakos

Construction
- Structure type: at-grade
- Depth: 1
- Platform levels: 1
- Parking: Yes
- Cycle facilities: No

Other information
- Status: Unstaffed
- Website: http://www.ose.gr/en/

History
- Opened: 1900
- Electrified: No
- Former names: Demirhisar/Demir Isar (before 1913)

Services
Preceding station	Regional Rail	Following station
Strymonas towards Thessaloniki	Line T3	Skotoussa towards Drama
Suspended services
Preceding station	Hellenic Train	Following station
Strymonas towards Thessaloniki	InterCity Thessaloniki–Alexandroupoli	Skotoussa towards Alexandroupoli
Strymonas towards Thessaloniki	InterCity Thessaloniki–Serres	Skotoussa towards Serres
Location
- Location within Greece

Sidirokastro railway station (Greek: Σιδηροδρομικός Σταθμός Σιδηροκάστρου, romanized: Sidirodromikós Stathmós Sidirokástrou) is a railway station that serves the nearby community of Sidirokastro, in Serres in East Macedonia and Thrace, Greece. The station is located 1.5 kilometres (0.93 mi) (20 Min walk) from town centre. The station building (as of 2021) is unstaffed.

== History ==
The station opened in 1900. However the line (in use from 1896) was used greatly during the Greco-Turkish War of 1897 for military purposes for the first time, especially for the transportation of soldiers, equipment or supplies. The settlement was known before 1927 with the Ottoman Turkish name Demirhisar (Greek: Δεμιρ Ισάρ).

In 1912, Sidirokastro was captured by the Bulgarians under general Georgi Todorov, however some months later it was annexed by Greece on 18 October 1912 during the First Balkan War. In 1915, during World War I, it came under the control of the Central Powers (especially Bulgaria), but it remained part of the Greek state when the war ended (1918). On 17 October 1925, The Greek government purchased the Greek sections of the former Salonica Monastir railway and the railway became part of the Hellenic State Railways, with the remaining section north of Florina seeded to Yugoslavia. In 1970 OSE became the legal successor to the SEK, taking over responsibilities for most of Greece's rail infrastructure. On 1 January 1971, the station and most of Greek rail infrastructure where transferred to the Hellenic Railways Organisation S.A., a state-owned corporation. Freight traffic declined sharply when the state-imposed monopoly of OSE for the transport of agricultural products and fertilisers ended in the early 1990s. Many small stations of the network with little passenger traffic were closed down.

In 2001 the infrastructure element of OSE was created, known as GAIAOSE; it would henceforth be responsible for the maintenance of stations, bridges and other elements of the network, as well as the leasing and the sale of railway assists. In 2003, OSE launched "Proastiakos SA", as a subsidiary to serve the operation of the suburban network in the urban complex of Athens during the 2004 Olympic Games. In 2005, TrainOSE was created as a brand within OSE to concentrate on rail services and passenger interface. On 9 September 2007, the station reopened. In 2008, all Proastiakos services were transferred from OSE to TrainOSE.

In 2009, with the Greek debt crisis unfolding OSE's Management was forced to reduce services across the network. Timetables were cutback, routes closed, and stations left abandoned as the government-run entity attempted to reduce overheads. Services from Thessaloniki and Alexandroupolis were cut back from six to just two trains a day, reducing the reliability of services and passenger numbers. In 2017 OSE's passenger transport sector was privatised as TrainOSE, currently, a wholly owned subsidiary of Ferrovie dello Stato Italiane infrastructure, including stations, remained under the control of OSE. Since 2020, the station is served by the Thessaloniki Regional Railway (formerly the Suburban Railway). In July 2022, the station began being served by Hellenic Train, the rebranded TranOSE

In August 2025, the Greek Ministry of Infrastructure and Transport confirmed the creation of a new body, Greek Railways (Greek: Σιδηρόδρομοι Ελλάδος, romanized: Ellinikí Sidiródromi Monoprósopi) to assume responsibility for rail infrastructure, planning, modernisation projects, and rolling stock across Greece. Previously, these functions were divided among several state-owned entities: OSE, which managed infrastructure; ERGOSÉ, responsible for modernisation projects; and GAIAOSÉ, which owned stations, buildings, and rolling stock. OSE had overseen both infrastructure and operations until its vertical separation in 2005. Rail safety has been identified as a key priority. The merger follows the July approval of a Parliamentary Bill to restructure the national railway system, a direct response to the Tempi accident of February 2023, in which 43 people died after a head-on collision.

== Facilities ==
The station is still housed in the original 20th-century brick-built station building. As of 2020, the station is slightly rundown. It is unstaffed. There is no footbridge over the lines, though passengers can walk across the rails and not wheelchair accessible. The station is also not equipped with digital display screens or timetable poster boards. However, a cafe/restaurant is located in an adjoining building, but still within the station limits.

== Services ==
As of 12 May 2025, Line 3 of the Thessaloniki Regional Railway calls at this station: service is currently limited, with two trains per day to Thessaloniki (trains 1635 and 3633), one train per day to Serres (3632), and one train per day to Drama (1634, via Serres).

It was also served by two long-distance trains between Thessaloniki and Alexandroupolis, but the service is currently suspended.

== Station layout ==
L Ground/Concourse	Customer service	Tickets/Exits
Level; Ε1
Level; Ε1	Side platform, doors on the right/left
Level; Ε1	Platform 1	T3 towards Thessaloniki ←
Level; Ε1	Island platform, doors on the right/left
Level; Ε1	Platform 2	T3 towards Serres →
Level; Ε1	Island platform, doors on the right/left
Level; Ε1	Platform 3	towards Alexandroupoli (Skotoussa) →
