= Sintiki =

Municipality in Central Macedonia, Greece

Sintiki Σιντική
- Municipality
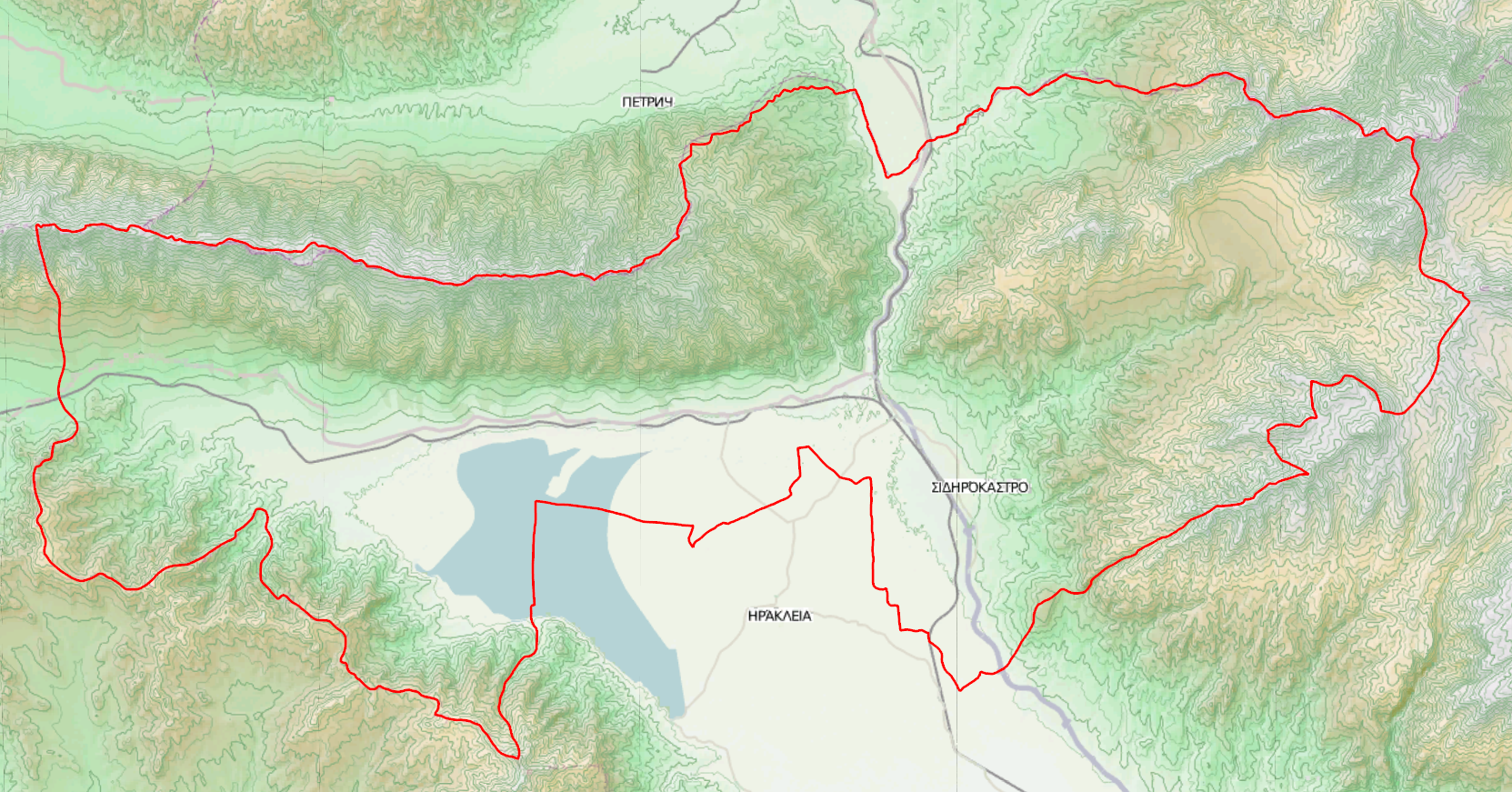

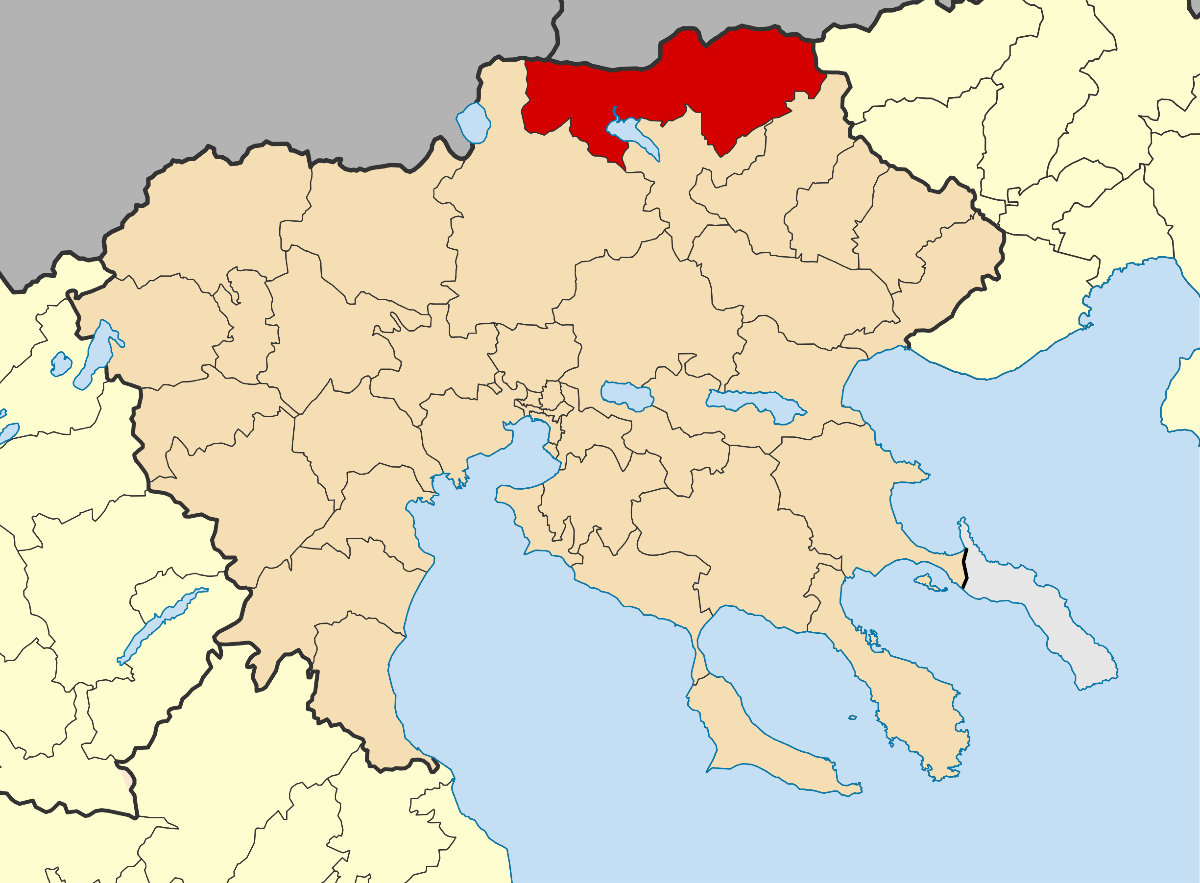

- Location within Greece
- Coordinates: 41°14′N 23°23′E
- Country: Greece
- Administrative region: Central Macedonia
- Regional unit: Serres
- Seat: Sidirokastro

Government
  - Mayor: Georgios Tatsios (since 2023)

Area
  - Municipality: 1,103.4 km^{2} (426.0 sq mi)

Population (2021)
  - Municipality: 18,544
  - Density: 16.806/km^{2} (43.528/sq mi)
- Time zone: UTC+2 (EET)
  - Summer (DST): UTC+3 (EEST)
- Website: www.sintiki.gov.gr

Sintiki (Greek: Σιντική) is a municipality in the Serres regional unit of Central Macedonia, Greece. It covers an area of 1,103.431 km^{2} and has a population of 18,544 according to the 2021 census. The seat of the municipality is the town of Sidirokastro.

== Etymology ==
Sintiki is named after Sintike, an ancient region and later district of the Kingdom of Macedon that was inhabited by the Sintians, a Thracian or possibly Pelasgian people.

== Municipality ==
The municipality was formed after the administrative reform in 2010 (Kallikratis plan) from the merger of the former municipalities of Kerkini, Petritsi and Sidirokastro and the rural municipalities of Agkistro, Achladochori and Promachonas. The administrative seat of the municipality is Sidirokastro. The former municipalities and rural municipalities have since formed the six municipal districts. The community is further subdivided into 3 city districts and 23 local communities.

Municipal unit	Greek name	code	Area (km^{2})	Residents (2021)	City districts / local communities	location
Sidirokastro	Δημοτική Ενότητα Σιδηροκάστρου	120701	196.826	7,937	Sidirokastro, Vamvakofyto, Kamaroto, Strymonochori, Charopo, Chortero	
Agkistro	Δημοτική Ενότητα Αγκίστρου	120702	71.457	350	Agkistro	without
Achladochori	Δημοτική Ενότητα Αχλαδοχωρίου	120703	185.255	643	Achladochori, Kapnofyto	without
Kerkini	Δημοτική Ενότητα Κερκίνη	120704	352.803	5,530	Kerkini, Anatoli, Ano Poroia, Kastanoussa, Kato Poroia, Livadia, Makrinitsa, Neochori, Platanakia, Rodopoli	without
Petritsi	Δημοτική Ενότητα Πετριτσίου	120705	251.500	3,900	Neo Petritsi, Akritochori, Ano Vyronia, Gonimo, Mandraki, Megalochori	without
Promachonas	Δημοτική Ενότητα Προμαχώνος	120706	42.320	184	Promachonas	without
Total		1207	1100.161	18,544		

== Province ==
The province of Sintiki (Greek: Επαρχία Σιντικής) was one of the provinces of the Serres Prefecture. Its territory corresponded with that of the current municipality Sintiki, and a small part of the municipality Irakleia. It was abolished in 2006.
