= Achladochori, Serres =

Achladochori Αχλαδοχώρι
- Municipal unit
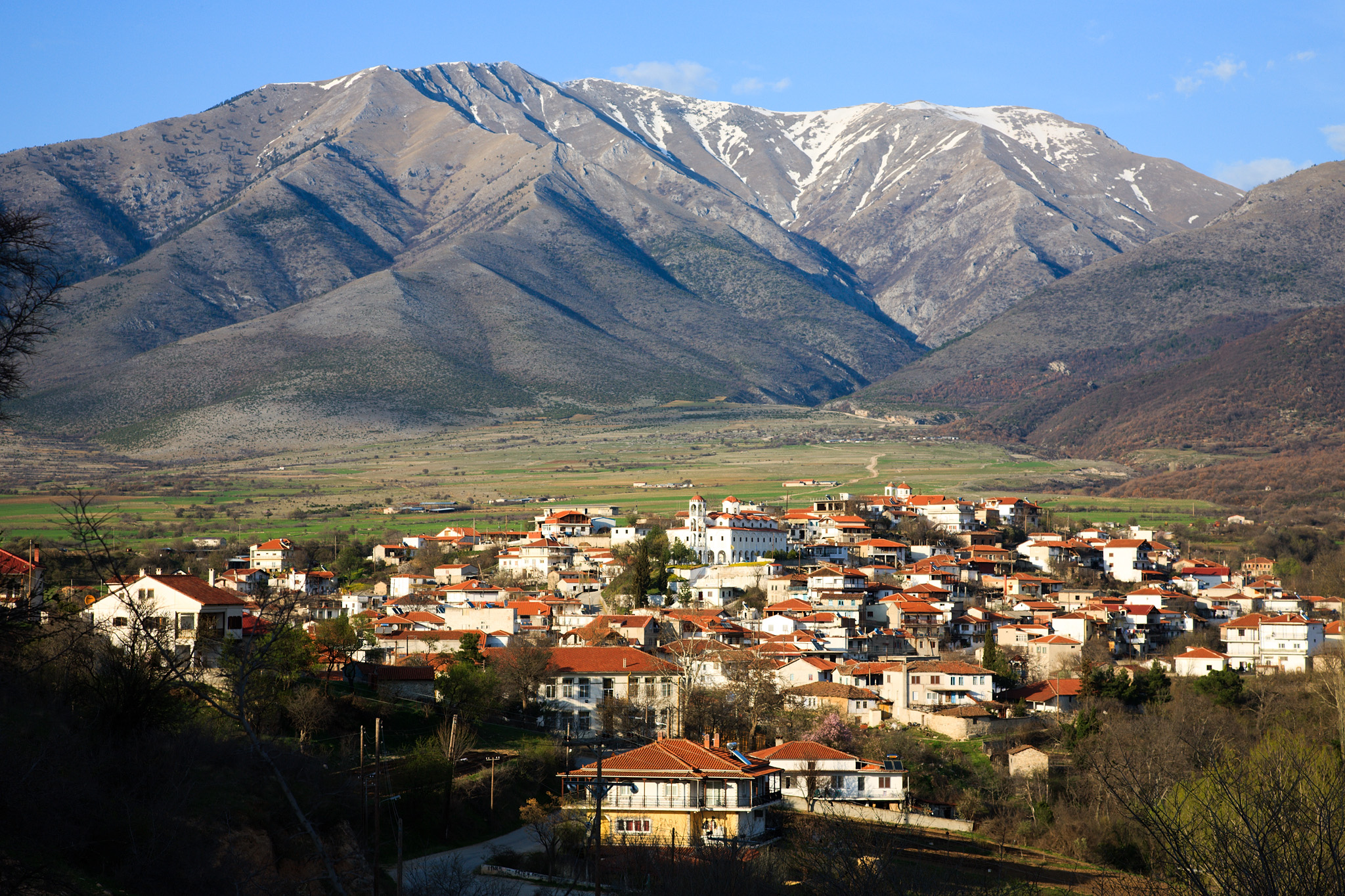
- View from Achladochori

- Location within the regional unit

- Location within Greece
- Coordinates: 41°19′N 23°33′E
- Country: Greece
- Administrative region: Central Macedonia
- Regional unit: Serres
- Municipality: Sintiki

Area
  - Municipal unit: 187.0 km^{2} (72.2 sq mi)

Population (2021)
  - Municipal unit: 643
  - Municipal unit density: 3.44/km^{2} (8.91/sq mi)
  - Community: 518
- Time zone: UTC+2 (EET)
  - Summer (DST): UTC+3 (EEST)
- Vehicle registration: ΕΡ

Achladochori (Greek: Αχλαδοχώρι, meaning "pear village", Macedonian: Крушево, Krushevo) is a village and a former community in the Serres regional unit, Greece. Since the 2011 local government reform it is part of the municipality Sintiki, of which it is a municipal unit. The municipal unit has an area of 187.019 km^{2}. It has a population of 643 (2021).

Near Achladochori there was an ancient city (probably the city of Tristolos), whose ruins has been found on the hill "Gradista", located 4 km north-east of the village.

== See also ==
- List of settlements in the Serres regional unit
