= Sintice =

Ancient region in present-day Greece

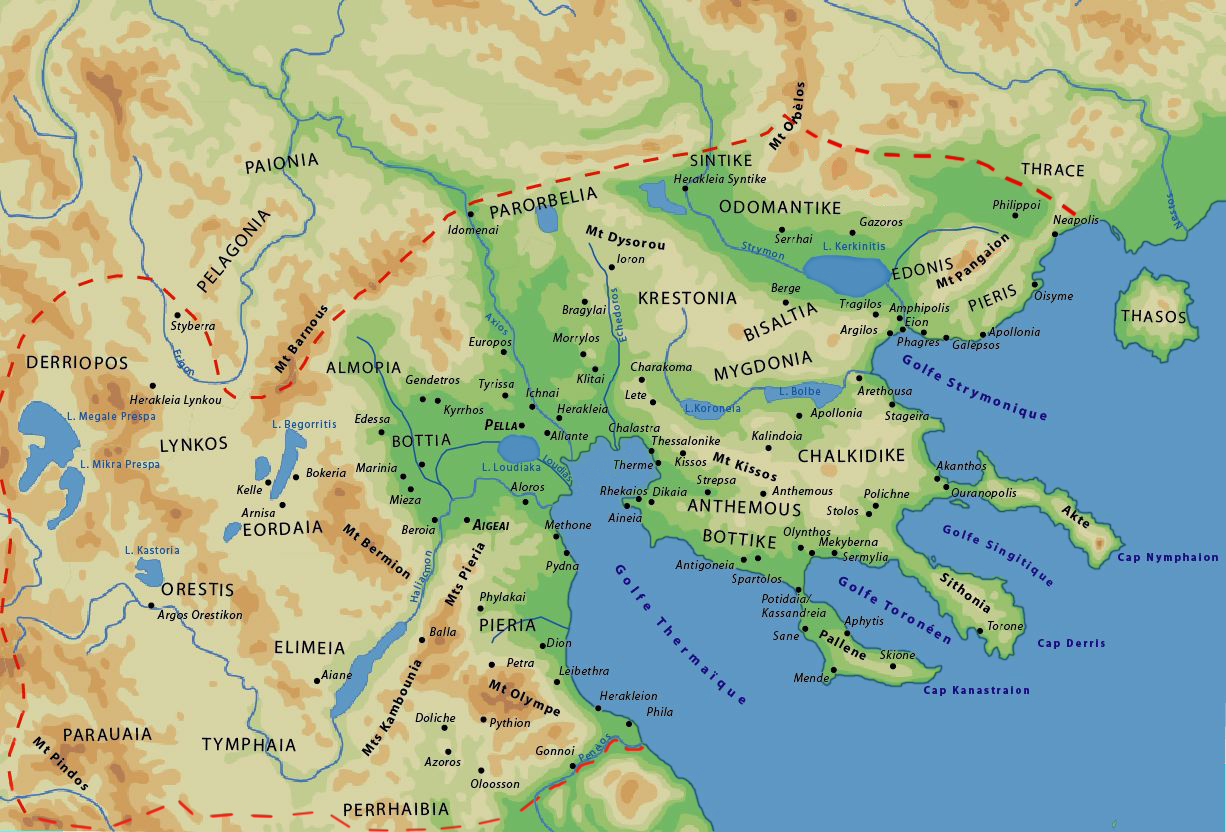
Map of the Kingdom of Macedon with the district of Sintike located in the north-east.

Sintice or Sintike (Greek: Σιντική) was an ancient region and later district of the kingdom of Macedon. It was located north of Bisaltia and Odomantike up to Messapio mount and west of Crestonia and South Paeonia to Strymon river and Orvilos mount. Its name is derived from the Sintians, a tribe which once inhabited the region. Beyond it, was stretching Medike which was held by the powerful Thracian tribe of Medi with which the Macedonians were in constant wars.

The contemporary municipality of Sintiki is situated approximately in the same location as the ancient region, after which it is named.

== Archaic - Hellenistic period ==
The region of Sintice was first inhabited by the tribe of Sintians (Greek: Σίντιοι, Σίντοι). These people were described by Strabo as Thracians, but other historians claimed that they were Pelasgians, closely related to the indigenous inhabitants of Samothrace. Homer describes them with the adjective "Agriophones" (Ἀγριόφωνες, lit. "of wild speech").

There were many towns in Sintice of which we know Heraclea Sintica, Paroecopolis, Skotousa, Gareskos, Orbelia and Tristolos. The most important of them was Heraclea, which was built by Amyntas III. The Macedonian king had achieved a great victory against barbarians and because of that he built the town in honor to Heracles, from whom the Macedonian kings claimed descent. He fortified the town with impregnable walls, parts of which can be seen to this day. In the times of Antigonid dynasty the town became capital of Sintice district and seat of the eparch of Paeonia as the historian Titus Livius mentions.

== Roman period and Later ==
In 168 BC Perseus, the last king of Macedon and son of Philip V, killed in Heraclea Sintica his brother Demitrius, successor of the Macedonian throne. The reasons of the fratricide were two; the rivalry and the pro-Roman influence of the victim, who when small had been raised in Rome. With the death of Demetrius the Romans found a reason to preach the war to Macedonians and the war started immediately.

The Sintians, Meadi and other people sided with Perseus and fought the Romans with zeal. However, in the Battle of Pydna (168 BC) the Romans won and conquered the kingdom of Macedon. After that the kingdom was divided into four client states and Sintice was included in the first with Amphipolis as capital. Subsequently, after the Battle of Philippi in 42 BC the ancient capital of Sintice, Heraclea, was made a "free town" as Titus Livy mentions. It was still in existence in the 10th century AD when it was mentioned for the last time by Hierocles and Constantine VII Porphyrogennetos.
