= Petritsi =

Petritsi Πετρίτσι
- Municipal unit
- Location within the regional unit

- Location within Greece
- Coordinates: 41°16′N 23°18′E
- Country: Greece
- Administrative region: Central Macedonia
- Regional unit: Serres
- Municipality: Sintiki

Area
  - Municipal unit: 253.1 km^{2} (97.7 sq mi)

Population (2021)
  - Municipal unit: 3,900
  - Municipal unit density: 15/km^{2} (40/sq mi)
- Time zone: UTC+2 (EET)
  - Summer (DST): UTC+3 (EEST)
- Vehicle registration: ΕΡ

Petritsi (Greek: Πετρίτσι) is a former municipality in the Serres regional unit, Greece. Since the 2011 local government reform it is part of the municipality Sintiki, of which it is a municipal unit, with a population of 3,900 (2021). The municipal unit has an area of 253.075 km^{2}. The seat of the municipality was in Neo Petritsi.

== Transport ==
The settlement is served by Petritsi railway station on the Thessaloniki-Alexandroupoli line, with daily services to Thessaloniki and Alexandroupolis.
