= Kulata =

Kulata Кулата
- Village
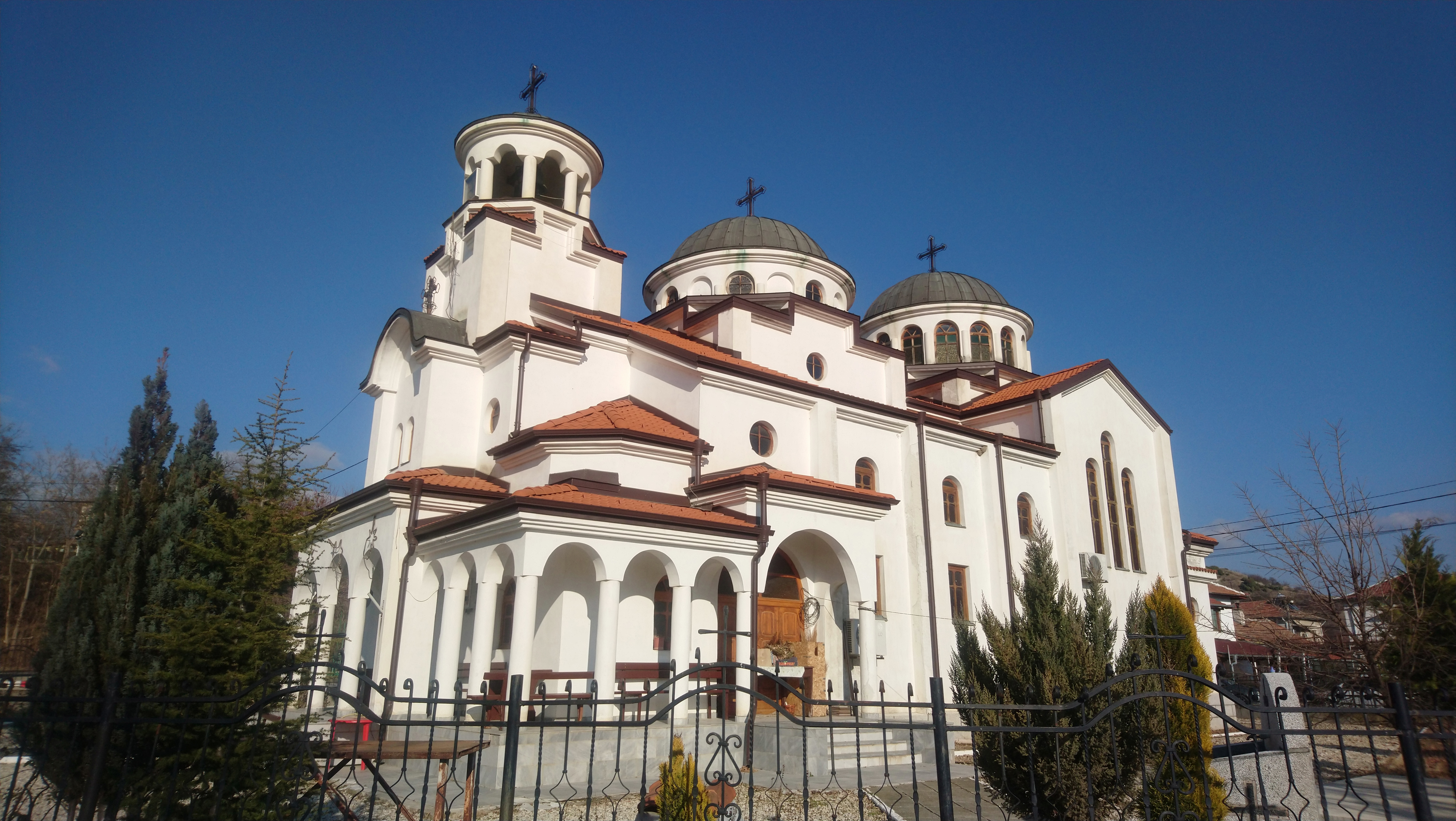
- St. Athanasius Church in the village of Kulata

- Location in Bulgaria
- Coordinates: 41°23′15″N 23°21′50″E
- Country: Bulgaria
- Province: Blagoevgrad
- Municipality: Petrich

Government
  - Mayor: Dimitar Manolev (Ind.)

Area
  - Total: 8.27 km^{2} (3.19 sq mi)
- Elevation: 105 m (344 ft)

Population (2015)
  - Total: 834
- Postal code: 2868
- Area code: 07425
- Vehicle registration: Е

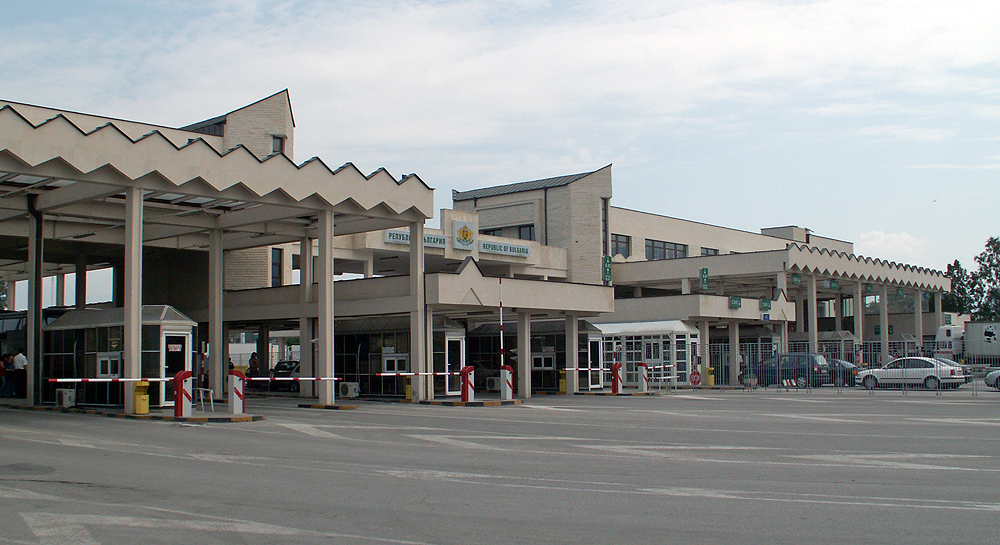
Kulata checkpoint on the Bulgarian-Greek border

Kulata (Bulgarian: Кулата [ˈkuɫɐtɐ], lit. 'the tower', Greek: Κούλα or Κούλατα) is a village in Petrich Municipality, Blagoevgrad Province, in southwestern Bulgaria. As of 2006 it has 892 inhabitants and the mayor is Dimitar Manolev. The village is a major border checkpoint on the border with Greece. The community of Promachonas in Serres regional unit lies across the border.

The first-class European route E79 and the railway from Sofia to Thessaloniki pass through the village. It will be an important stop on the Struma motorway.
