= Doukas Gaitatzis =

- Δούκας Γαϊτατζής
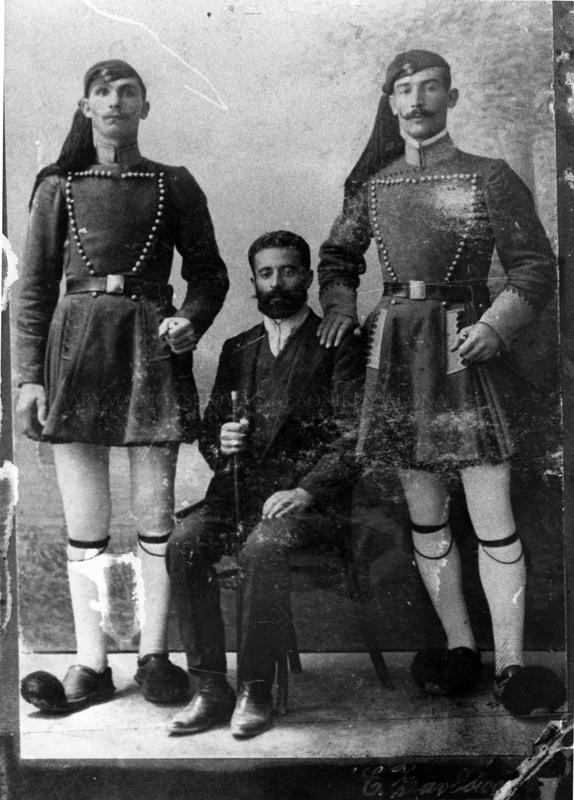
- Doukas Gaitatzis with two guards c. 1900s

Member of Parliament for Serres Prefecture
- In office 1936–1938
- Monarch: George II
- Prime Minister: Ioannis Metaxas

Personal details
- Born: c. 1879 Serres, Salonika Vilayet, Ottoman Empire (now Greece)
- Died: 1938 Paris, Third French Republic
- Party: Freethinkers' Party
- Nickname(s): Kapetan Zervas; Καπετάν Ζέρβας

Military service
- Allegiance: Kingdom of Greece
- Branch/service: Hellenic Army
- Battles/wars: Macedonian Struggle; Battle of Gratsiani; Balkan Wars; First Balkan War; Second Balkan War

Doukas Gaitatzis (Greek: Δούκας Γαϊτατζής) also known under the nom de guerre as Kapetan Zervas (Greek: Καπετάν Ζέρβας) was a significant Greek chieftain of the Macedonian Struggle.

== Biography ==
Doukas Gaitatzis was born around 1879 in Serres, to one of the richest families of the area. In 1900, he joined the Macedonian Defense and collaborated with the Greek Consul of Serres, Ioannis Stournaras. He became an agent and informant of the National Center of Serres, trying to limit the early terrorist activity of the Bulgarian komitadjis.

After a failed attempt to exterminate the Bulgarian agent Stoyan in Rahovitsa (now Marmaras), he was forced to flee to Athens, where he met with Georgios Tsontos. He arrived in Western Macedonia in 1904 as a deputy in the armed group of Georgios Katechakis (Captain Rouvas) along with Dimitrios Dalipis and Simos Ioannidis. He soon assumed command of guerrilla forces operating throughout Western Macedonia and in the Giannitsa area. In 1905, head of an armed group of 20 people, he moved his area of activity to Eastern Macedonia. There he managed to confront the Bulgarian komitadjis and participated in various battles in the areas of Amphipolis, Nea Zichni, Nevrokop (now Gotse Delchev, Sintice and Pangaion Hills).

He also took part in the battle of Gratsiani (now Agiochori), where the komitadji Todor Panitsa was exterminated.

He also took part in both Balkan Wars, head of 100 soldiers in Pangaion Hills. With decisive actions he succeeded in liberating Pravi (now Eleftheroupoli) during the Second Balkan War.

In 1936, he was elected Member of the Prefecture of Serres with the Freethinkers' Party of Ioannis Metaxas.

He died in 1938 in Paris.
