= Sintians =

Thracian people of antiquity

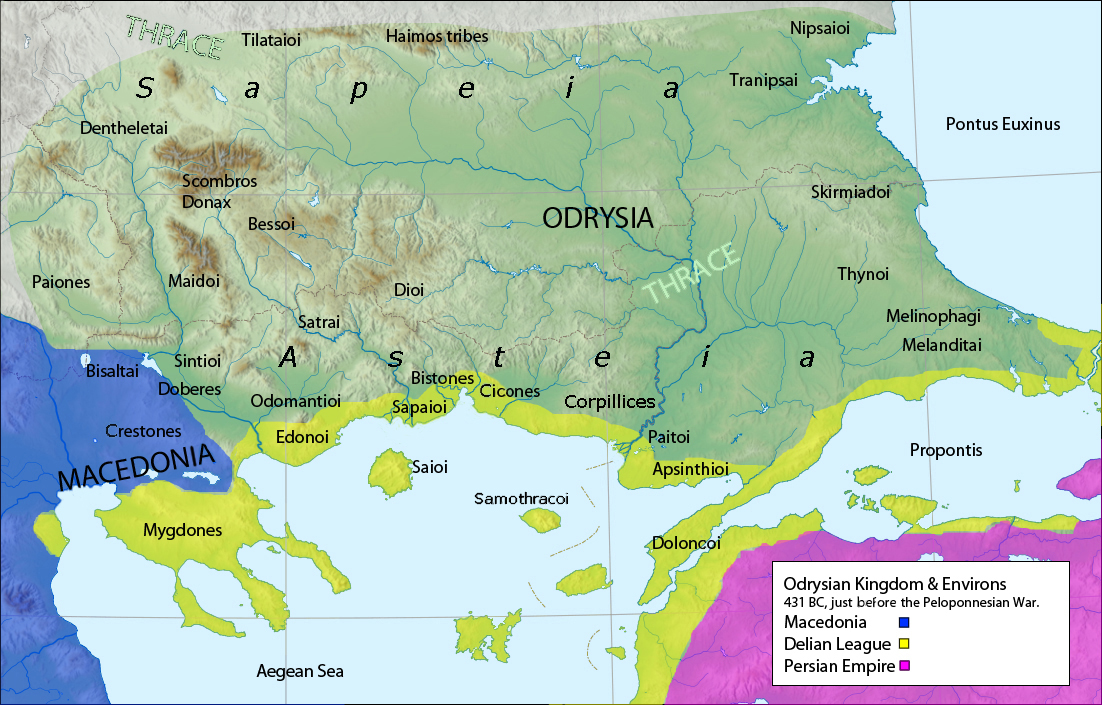
Approximate location of the Sinti

The Sintians (Ancient Greek: Σίντιες) were a group of people who were known to the Greeks as pirates and raiders. They are also referred to as a Thracian people who once inhabited the area of Sintice and the island of Lemnos which was also called in ancient times Sinteis. Some scholars have suggested that they were not Thracians but Pelasgians, related to another group who lived in Samothrace, also known as Sintians.

The Sintians worshipped Hephaestus. They are mentioned in Homer: in the Iliad as the folk who had tended Hephaestus in Lemnos after the lame smith god was let fall to earth; the Sintians "of wild speech" (ἀγριόφωνοι agriophonoi) also appear in the Odyssey; in the tradition reported by Homer it was understood by their incomprehensible speech that they were among the non-Hellenic peoples of the Aegean. "Because the Sintians have no place in the immediate context (that is, they are not asking the god for anything), we may suspect that they were the ones who in some pre-Homeric myth rescued the god." In 2002 the city of Heraclea Sintica was accidentally discovered at the foot of an extinct volcano on the land of Rupite, Bulgaria.
