= Fyllida =

Former administrative division of Serres Prefecture, Greece

Fyllida Province Επαρχία Φυλλίδας
- Province of Greece
- 2006
- Capital: Nea Zichni

Fyllida was one of the four provinces of Serres Prefecture, Greece. Its territory corresponded with that of the current municipalities Amfipoli and Nea Zichni. It was abolished in 2006.
