= Vrontou =

Vrontou (Greek: Βροντού) may refer to several places in Greece:

- Ano Vrontou, a village in the Serres regional unit
- Kato Vrontou, a village in the municipality of Kato Nevrokopi in the Drama regional unit
- Vrontou, Pieria, a village in the municipality Dio-Olympos, Pieria
- Vrontous, a mountain in the northeastern Serres regional unit
