= Banitsa (ruins) =

Deserted village in Serres regional unit, Greece

Banitsa Καρυαί
- Village
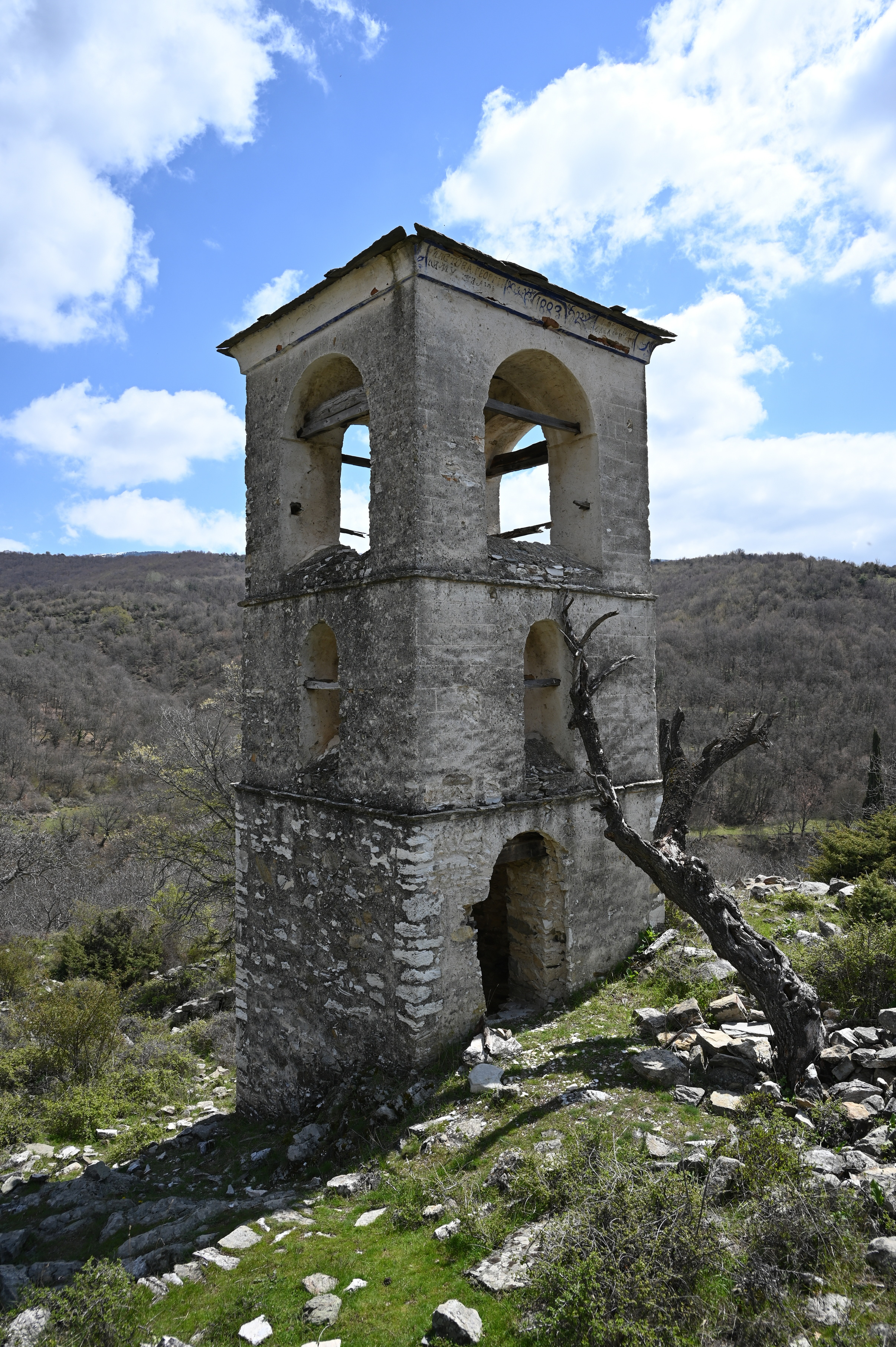
- The bell tower in the village

- Location within Greece
- Coordinates: 41°12′N 23°37′E
- Country: Greece
- Region: Central Macedonia
- Time zone: EET
  - Summer (DST): EEST

Banitsa (Greek: Καρυαί; Bulgarian and Macedonian: Баница) is an abandoned village in Serres regional unit, Greece. The ruins lie about 15 km northeast of Serres, near the village Oreini, on the southern slopes of the Vrontous mountains.

== Name ==
The official name of the village until 1922 was Μπάνιτσα (Bánitsa), when it was renamed to Καρυαί (Karié). The name of this village in Bulgarian and Macedonian is Баница (Banitsa).

According to Yordan N. Ivanov, the name Banitsa does not come from the pastry banitsa, but from the Bulgarian word for bath, баня (banya). Per him, the name comes from that word with the suffix -itsa. The inhabitant name is banichanin, banichanka, banichane. However, according to Bulgarian military officer Slavcho Daskalov, the origin of the name dates back to the beginning of the 19th century, after the plague epidemic of 1812–1814, during which a large part of the inhabitants of the village and the surrounding neighborhoods died. The survivors gathered in the central neighborhood and began to call this central place Sbranishte, a name that transformed into Branishta, Branishte, and Banitsa.

== History ==
Until the mid-19th century, the population of the village was engaged in washing magnetite sand. With the decline of ironworking in the second half of the century, the villagers began producing charcoal, which they sold in Serres.

In 1877 the village had an Uniate church where the priests Dimitar Lamashev and Zahariy Zaprev served.

During the Ottoman period it had a Bulgarian population. According to Ethnographie des vilayets d'Andrinople: de Monastir, et de Salonique, which was published in 1878, the village had 101 houses and a population of 330 males, all recorded as Bulgarians. In 1889, Stefan Verkovich wrote that the population of the village was Bulgarian and that they engaged in agriculture. He noted that it had one school and one church. In 1891, Georgi Strezov wrote that the village had 90 houses and a population of 450, all Bulgarians, as well as a church "St. Mary" and a Greek-language school with 20 students. In statistics collected by Vasil Kanchov in 1900, the village had a population of 840, all recorded as Christian Bulgarians. In statistics collected by Dimitar Mishev (under the pseudonym Brancoff) in 1905, the village had a population of 1080, all Exarchist Bulgarians, with one Bulgarian primary school, one teacher and 38 students.

On 4 May 1903, IMRO revolutionary Gotse Delchev was killed here in a skirmish with Ottoman police forces.

The village was destroyed by the Greek Army during the Second Balkan War, and the population migrated to Bulgaria. Its inhabitants settled in Mehomiya, Bachevo, Nevrokop, Sveti Vrach, and Novo Delchevo. The priest Zahariy settled in Frashtani, then after the Treaty of Bucharest returned back to the village, but later fled to Bulgaria, likely due to persecution.

== Demographics ==
The population of the village from 1913 to 1928 is as follows: (Note: The '—' is for damaged and uninhabited settlements.)

Population by census year
Year	Population		
Year	Male	Female	Total
1913	—	—	—
1920	52	55	107
1928	58	37	95
