= Ano Vrontou =

Ano Vrontou Άνω Βροντού
- Municipal unit
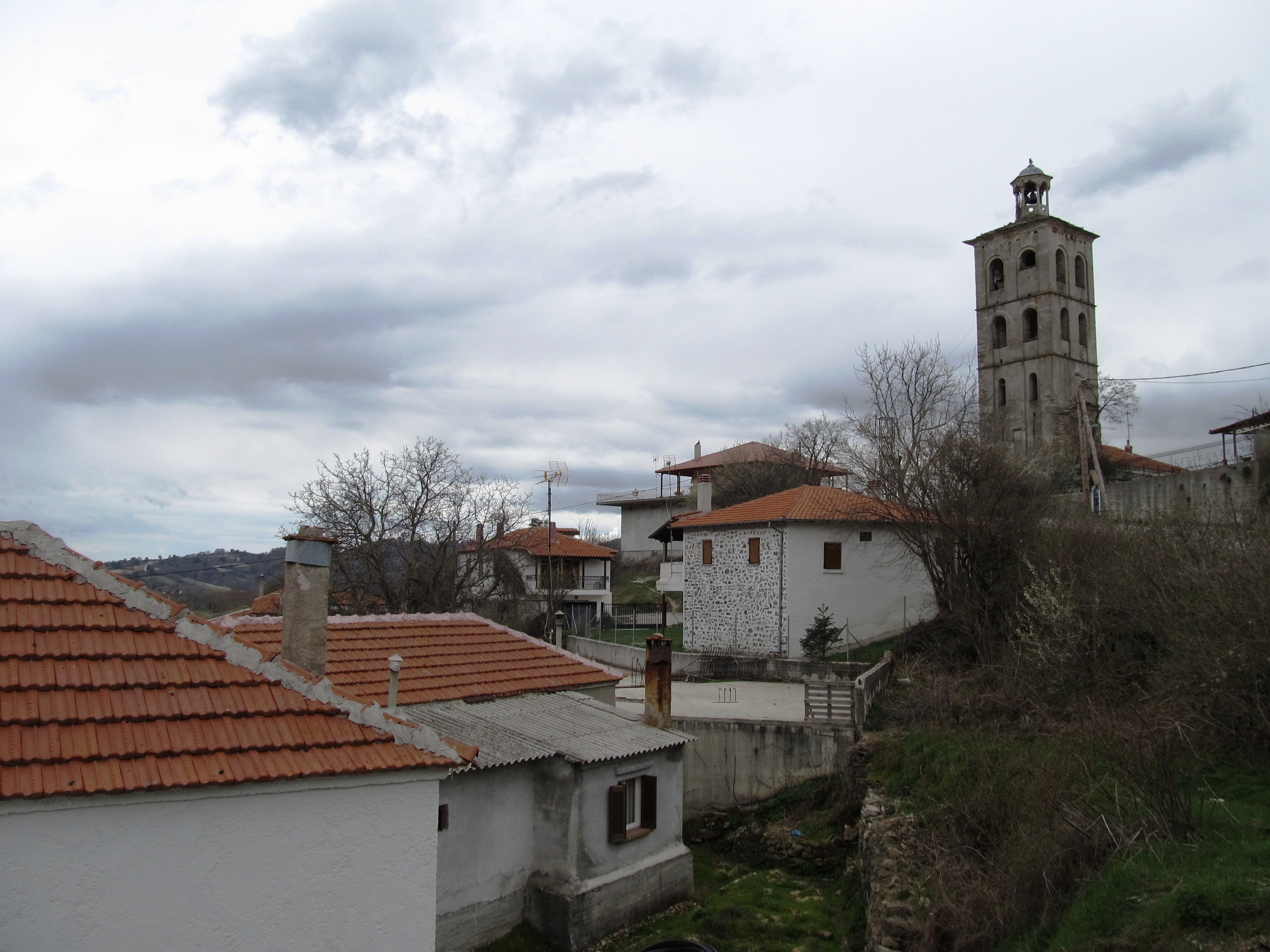
- View from Ano Vrontou

- Location within the regional unit

- Location within Greece
- Coordinates: 41°18′N 23°41′E
- Country: Greece
- Administrative region: Central Macedonia
- Regional unit: Serres
- Municipality: Serres

Area
  - Municipal unit: 47.3 km^{2} (18.3 sq mi)
- Elevation: 1,040 m (3,410 ft)

Population (2021)
  - Municipal unit: 216
  - Municipal unit density: 4.57/km^{2} (11.8/sq mi)
- Time zone: UTC+2 (EET)
  - Summer (DST): UTC+3 (EEST)
- Postal code: 621 00
- Vehicle registration: ΕΡ

Ano Vrontou (Greek: Άνω Βροντού; Bulgarian: Горно Броди, Gorno Brodi) is a remote mountain village and a former community in the northern Serres regional unit, Greece. Since the 2011 local government reform it is part of the municipality Serres, of which it is a municipal unit. Each year on August astrophotography hobbyists gather there due to the clear view of the night sky, a result of the villages high elevation. The municipal unit has an area of 47.306 km^{2}. Ano Vrontou is situated in the northeastern part of the Vrontous mountains, at about 1060 m elevation. It borders on the Drama regional unit to the north and east. Ano Vrontou is 6 km northwest of Kato Vrontou, 12 km east of Achladochori, 13 km northeast of Oreini, 16 km southwest of Kato Nevrokopi and 26 km northeast of Serres.

== Population ==
Historical population
Year	Pop.	±%
1873	2,700	—
1900	6,700	+148.1%
1981	347	−94.8%
1991	408	+17.6%
2001	406	−0.5%
2011	199	−51.0%
2021	216	+8.5%

== History ==
The finding of a Greek inscription of Roman (Imperial) times supports the conclusion that in the place of the present village there was an ancient settlement, whose residents were engaged in the exploitation of the iron mines of the mountain Vrontous.

Brodi (now Vrontou) was first mentioned in the 14th century in a letter from the Serbian tsar Stefan Dušan to Rayko, the ruler of Brodi and Trilisa (now Vathytopos). The Ottomans conquered the area and ruled until the Balkan Wars. Prior to the Second Balkan Wars, it had a Bulgarian majority and a Turkish minority.

It had around 2,700 Bulgarian-speaking inhabitants in 1873. By 1900, its population rose to 6,100 Bulgarian-speaking Christians. In 1905 according to the secretary of the exarch Dimitar Mishev the settlement had around 6,480 Bulgarian exarchists and 240 Bulgarian patriarchists, making it one of the largest places in the area.

The village had a large activity by VMORO in an Ottoman province. In 1903, the large settlement was visited by Gotse Delchev from the Vanisha. In 1913, it had 1,100 houses and 8,000 inhabitants. In the Balkan Wars, the area was conquered and occupied by Greece and most of its residents fled northward to Bulgaria, 200 of them to Nevrokop (now Gotse Delchev) and 300 fled to Plovdiv. Approximately 20 families remained to Ano Vrontou. The village's population was boosted in 1925 by Karamanlides Greeks that fled from the Cappadocia Region of Asia Minor, after Greece's defeat in the Greco-Turkish War (1919–1922).

The location of the village, at the border with Bulgaria was a factor that contributed to its growth, during the years 1925 (arrival of Cappadocian Greeks) – 1941 (Third Bulgarian occupation of Eastern Macedonia and Thrace). During the occupation, its inhabitants were forced to relocate lower, and the village was inhabited by 40 Bulgarian families, which remained there until late 1944. After the liberation of Greece from the Axis occupation, the inhabitants returned to Ano Vrontou, only to leave it 2 years later, in 1946, after the command of the Greek army, because its mountainous terrain made it a very appealing spot for the Greek Communists, who could use it for hiding or for reinforcements, during the Greek Civil War (1946–1949). The village was burned to the ground, possibly by the Greek army, in order to prevent the Greek partisans from using it as a base, since its location upon the mountains made Ano Vrontou unreachable. After the war, in 1950, the inhabitants were forced to rebuild the village.

== Etymology ==
The name of Ano Vrontou translates to "Upper Vrontou", while the name of the nearby village of Kato Vrontou translates to "Lower Vrontou". The Bulgarian names of the villages reflect this relationship as well, with Горно Броди (Gorno Brodi) translating to "Upper Brodi", and Долно Броди (Dolno Brodi) translating to "Lower Brodi".

== Notable people ==
- Dimo Hadjidimov, Internal Macedonian Revolutionary Organization's left-wing leader
- Tasos Stambouloglou (1937–2025), Greek poet and literary critic
- Georgi Sivkov (1909–1964), leader of the Bulgarian Fatherland Front
- Dimitar Paskov (1914–1986), Bulgarian chemist

== Literature ==
- Vasil Kanchov on Ano Vrontou (Gorno Brodi)
- Georgi Bazhdarov Gorno Brodi (Горно Броди or Ano Vrontou), Sofia, 1929
- Božidar Vidoeski, Gorno Vrodi, Drama, Skopje, 1992 XVII 2, pp. 5–89

== See also ==
- List of settlements in the Serres regional unit
