= Dimitar Paskov =

Dimitar Paskov (Bulgarian: Димитър Пасков, 18 October 1914, Gorno Brodi – 24 April 1986, Bulgaria) is a Bulgarian chemist who led the Sopharma team that extracted Nivalin (Galantamine) in 1959. The original phytopreparation is an extract of the alkaloid from bulbs of common snowdrop.

Galantamine hydrobromide (Nivalin) has formula C_{17}H_{21}NO_{3}.HBr and molecular weight 386.3.
