= Kato Vrontou =

Village in Eastern Macedonia, Greece

Kato Vrontou Κάτω Βροντού
- Municipal unit
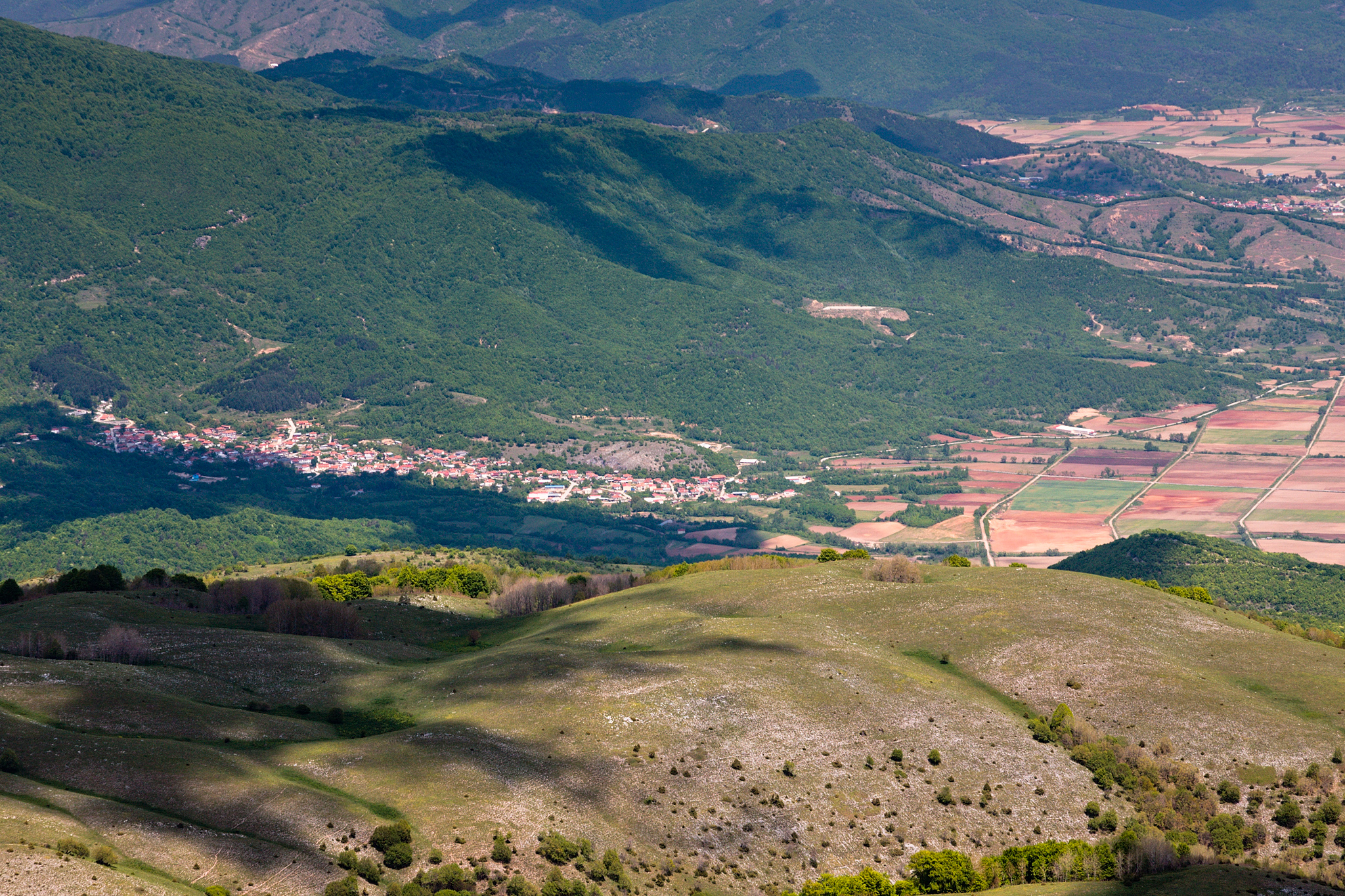
- View from afar

- Location within Greece
- Coordinates: 41°16′28″N 23°45′22″E
- Country: Greece
- Geographic region: Macedonia
- Administrative region: Eastern Macedonia and Thrace
- Regional unit: Drama
- Municipality: Kato Nevrokopi
- Elevation: 650 m (2,130 ft)

Population (2021)
  - Municipal unit: 287
- Time zone: UTC+2 (EET)
  - Summer (DST): UTC+3 (EEST)

Kato Vrontou (Greek: Κάτω Βροντού; Bulgarian: Долно Броди, romanized: Dolno Brodi) is a village in the Drama regional unit of Greece, and part of the municipality of Kato Nevrokopi, of which it is a municipal unit. It is located within a dense forest at an altitude of 650 meters, surrounded by the Vrontous mountains. According to the 2021 census, it has a population of 287.

== Name ==
The name of Kato Vrontou translates to "Lower Vrontou", with the nearby village of Ano Vrontou translating to "Upper Vrontou". The same relation is seen in the Bulgarian names of the villages as well, with Долно Броди (Dolno Brodi) meaning "Lower Brodi", and Горно Броди (Gorno Brodi) meaning "Upper Brodi".

== History ==
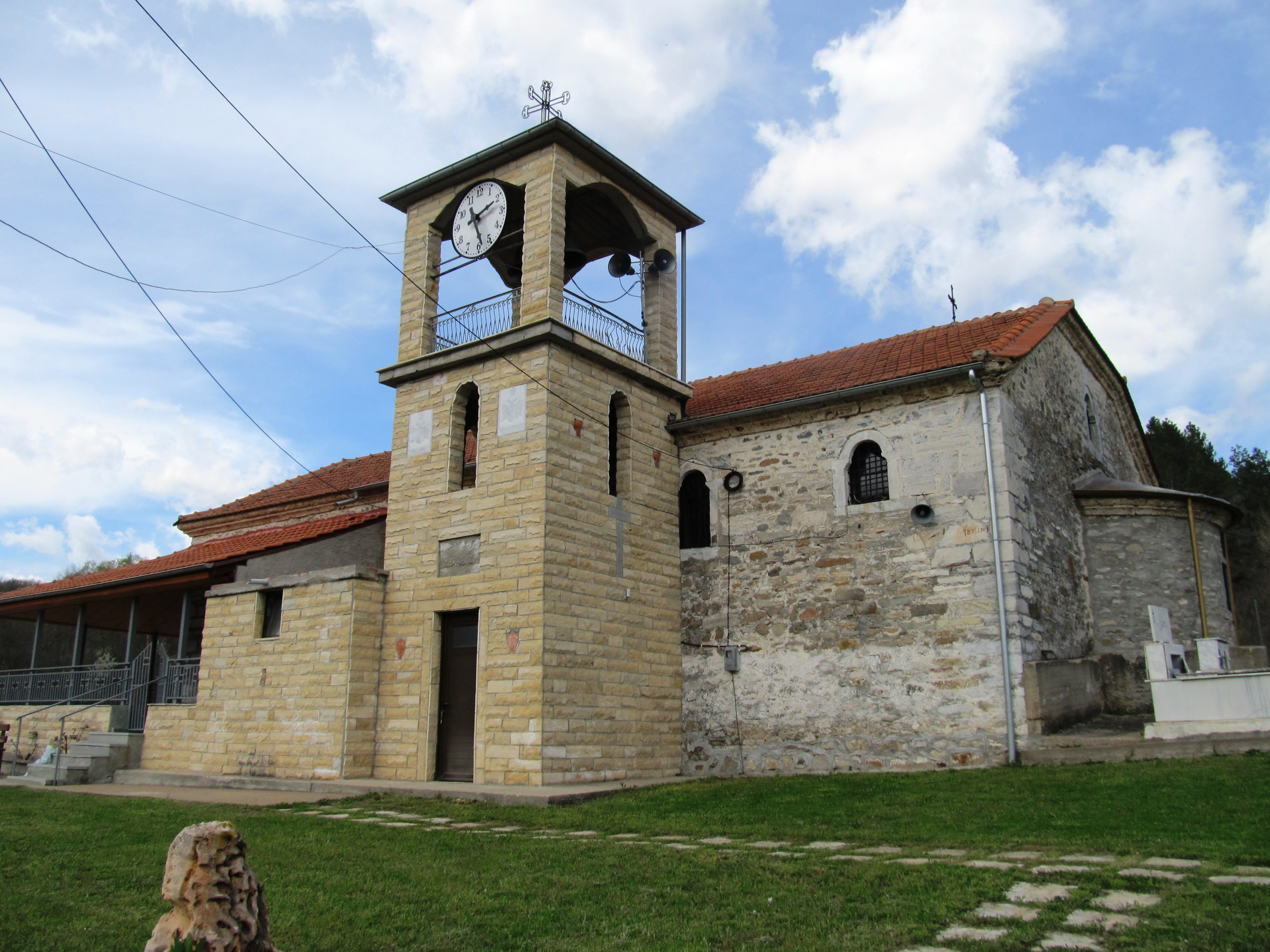
Church of Saints Theodores, built in 1835

Kato Vrontou was ceded to Greece from the Ottoman Empire in 1913 after the Treaty of Bucharest that ended the Balkan Wars. During the First Balkan War, Bulgaria had occupied the eastern part of what is now Greek Macedonia, where Kato Vrontou is located, and then Greece managed to take control of it in the second and final war. Bulgaria briefly occupied the region once again in 1916 during World War I, as part of the Struma operation.

As a result of the Treaty of Neuilly-sur-Seine and the Lausanne Convention, from 1920 to 1929 the Bulgarian and Muslim populations of the village were transferred to Bulgaria and Turkey respectively. Greek refugees from Thrace and Anatolia, especially Pontians, settled there with the majority of the modern population being the descendants of those.

During the Second World War, Bulgaria along with Germany occupied the region for three years from 1941 to 1944 as part of the Axis occupation of Greece. It has been in continuous peacetime since then.

=== Church of Saints Theodores ===
Kato Vrontou is home to the historic church of Saints Theodores, a three-aisled basilica which was built in 1835 in what was then the Ottoman Empire. The church is housing icons dating back to 1839 and 1863.

== Population ==
The population of Kato Vrontou is in majority of Anatolian Greek, mainly Pontian, ancestry. However, Pontic Greek is not the primary dialect spoken among the descendants of the original settlers, with most having switched to Standard Greek. The residents are mainly engaged in livestock farming and the agriculture of potatoes and beans. The village has experienced a population decline in the last decade.

Historical population
| Year | Pop. | ±% |
|---|---|---|
| 1981 | 483 | — |
| 1991 | 401 | −17.0% |
| 2001 | 427 | +6.5% |
| 2011 | 554 | +29.7% |
| 2021 | 287 | −48.2% |
