= Oreini, Serres =

Oreini Ορεινή
- Municipal unit
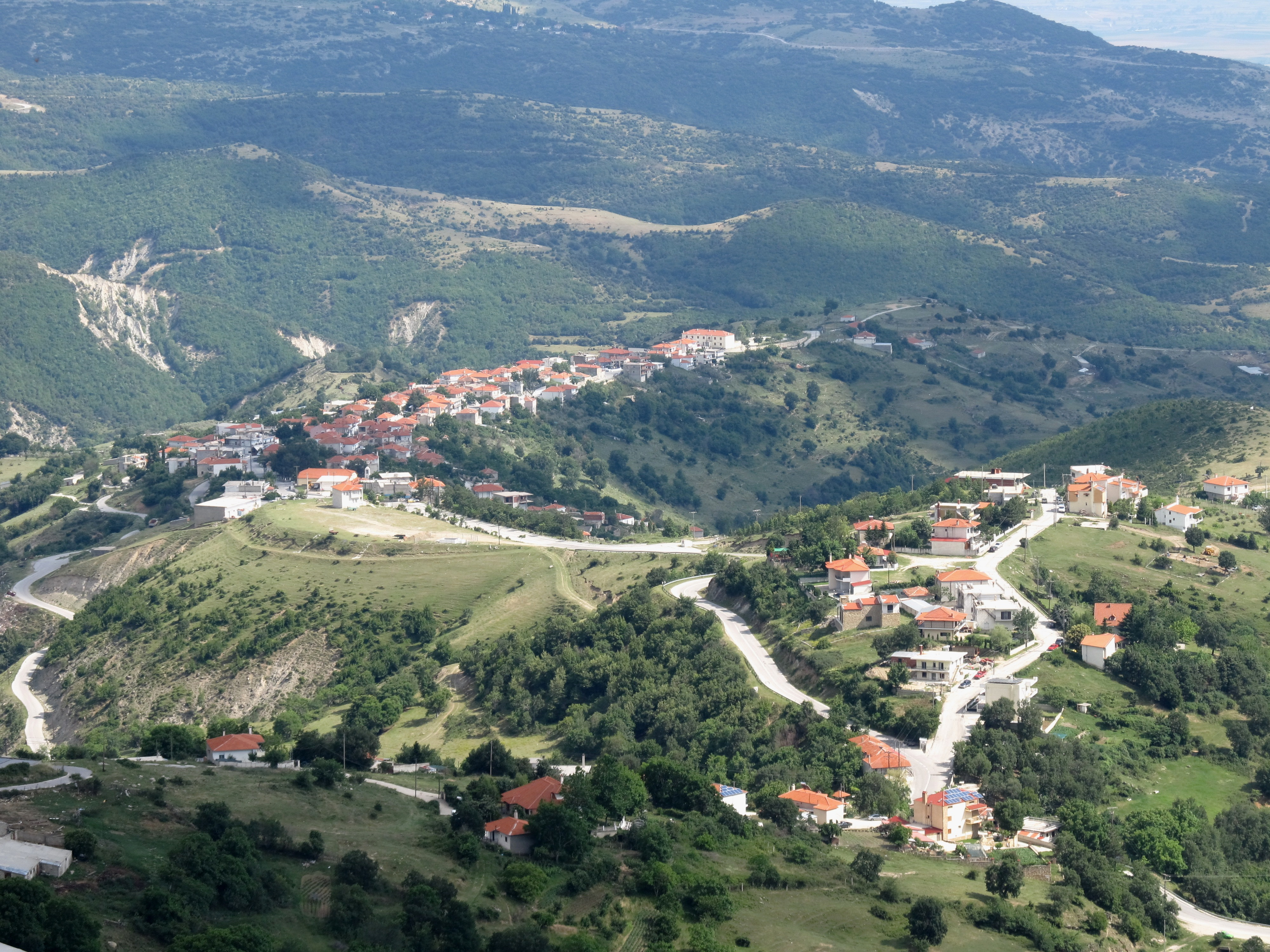
- General view of Oreini

- Location within the regional unit

- Location within Greece
- Coordinates: 41°12′N 23°36′E
- Country: Greece
- Administrative region: Central Macedonia
- Regional unit: Serres
- Municipality: Serres

Area
  - Municipal unit: 54.3 km^{2} (21.0 sq mi)

Population (2021)
  - Municipal unit: 575
  - Municipal unit density: 10.6/km^{2} (27.4/sq mi)
- Time zone: UTC+2 (EET)
  - Summer (DST): UTC+3 (EEST)
- Vehicle registration: ΕΡ

Oreini (Greek: Ορεινή) (Bulgarian: Горно Фръщани, Gorno Frashtani) is a village and a former community in the Serres regional unit, Greece. Since the 2011 local government reform it is part of the municipality Serres, of which it is a municipal unit. The municipal unit has an area of 54.309 km^{2}. Population is 575 inhabitants (2021).

Northeast of the modern village (approximately 2 km), on the hill of "Prophet Helias", the site of a Roman settlement has been identified. His foundation, dating back to early antiquity, is associated with the rich iron mines of mountain Vrontous, as is evidenced by the discovery of an iron smelter side the ruins of a Roman castle, located 3–4 km east of the hill of "Prophet Helias".

The ruins of Banitsa, a formerly Bulgarian inhabited village abandoned in 1913, are also nearby.

== See also ==
List of settlements in the Serres regional unit
