= Vrontous =

Mountain range in Greece

- Βροντούς
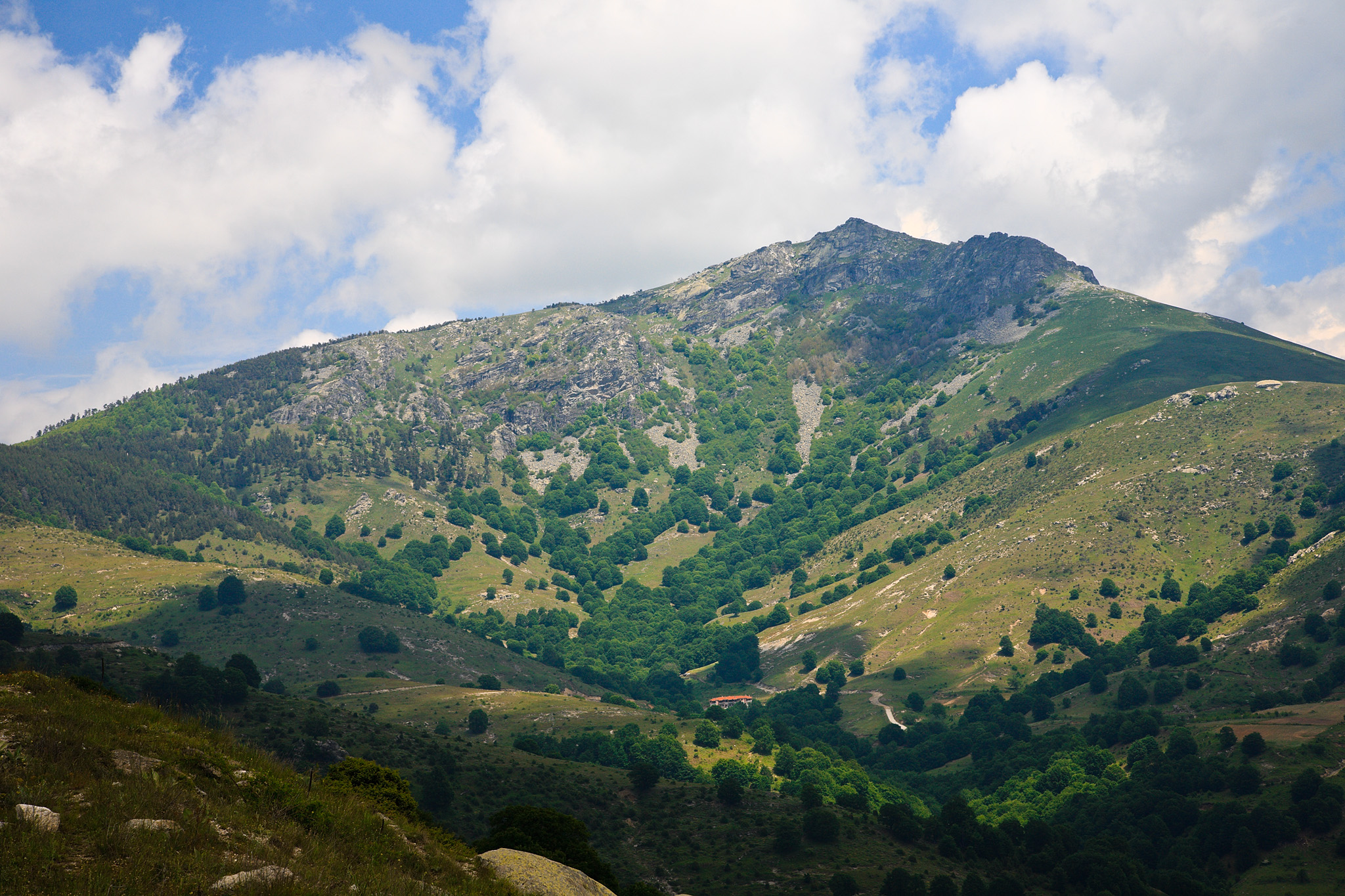

Highest point
- Elevation: 1,849 m (6,066 ft)
- Coordinates: 41°15′29″N 23°36′07″E

Naming
- Pronunciation: Greek: [vroˈdus]

Geography
- Location within Greece
- Location: Northeastern Serres and western Drama regional unit, Greece

Vrontous (Greek: Βροντούς, Bulgarian: Шарлия - Sharliya) is a mountain range in the northeastern Serres and the westernmost Drama regional units in Greece. Its highest peak is the Ali Babas (Greek: Αλή Μπαμπάς) at 1,849 m elevation. Other notable peaks are the Kour Lof (1,667 m, southwest of Ali Babas), Mavro vouno (1,653 m, northeast), Siderovouni (1,475 m, east) and Sarligia (1,404 m, southwest). It is a densely forested and sparsely populated mountain range. It stretches between the village Vamvakofyto in the southwest and Perithori in the northeast, over a length of about 35 km. The nearest mountains are the Slavyanka/Orvilos to the north and the Menoikio to the southeast.

The nearest larger towns are Serres to the south and Sidirokastro to the west. Villages in the Vrontous mountains include Ano Vrontou, Kato Vrontou and Katafyto in the east, Achladochori in the north and Oreini in the south. The Greek National Road 63/E79 (Serres - Sidirokastro - Promachonas - Bulgaria) passes west of the mountains. The small ski resort Lailias is situated in the Vrontous mountains.

The mountains were rich in minerals (silver and iron), which took advantage of the people from ancient to modern times. This is attested by the discovery of Roman mines and an iron smelter near the village Oreini, and also the mention of iron works, during the Byzantine and modern times, in the village Ano Vrontou.

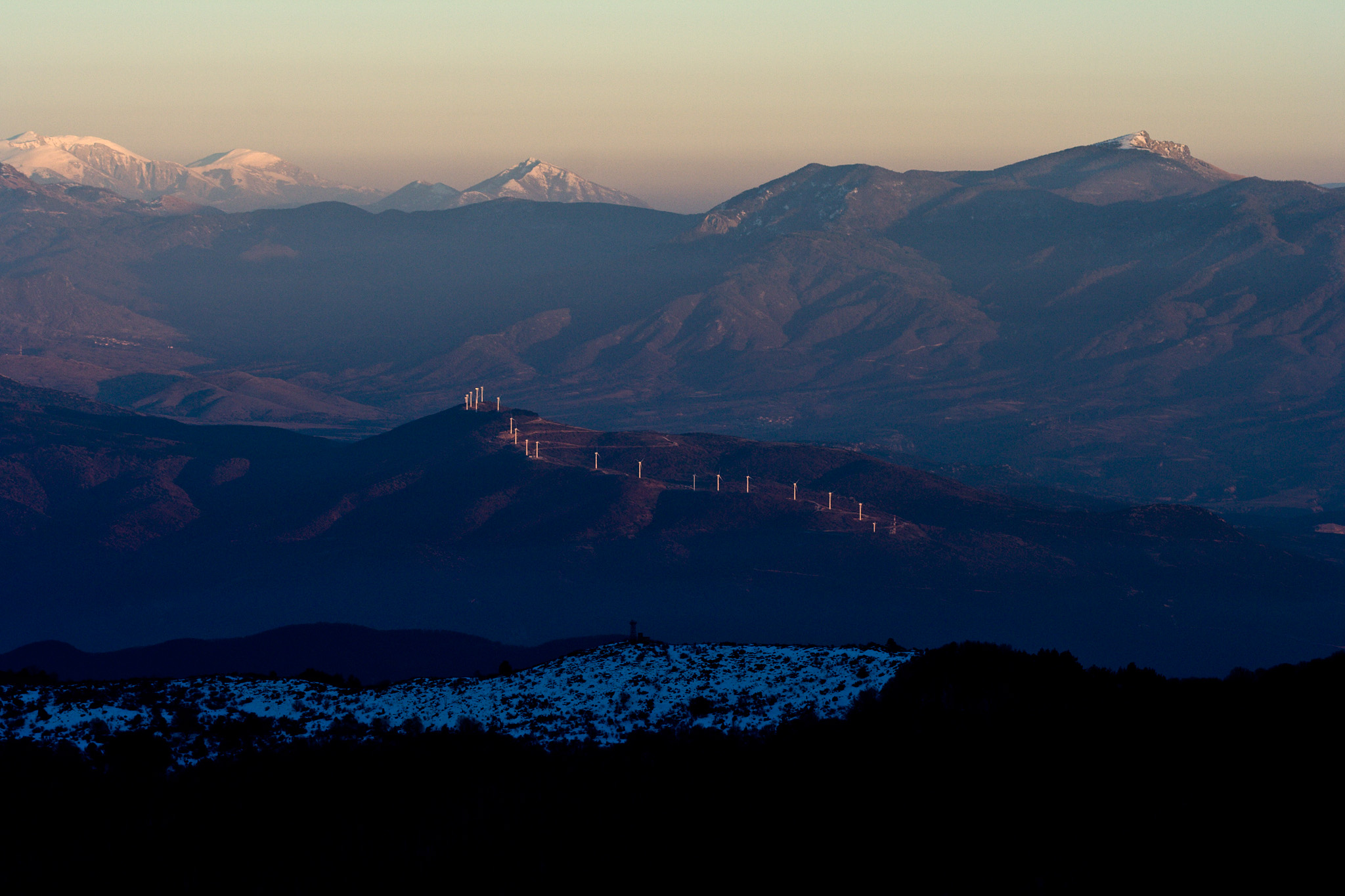
Vrontous

== See also ==
- List of mountains in Greece
