= Elatia =

Elatia (Greek: Ελατιά or Ancient Greek: Ἐλάτεια) may refer to:

- Elatia, Drama (Ελατιά)
- Elatia (mountain), in Drama and Kavala, Greek Macedonia
- Elatia, Zakynthos (Ελατιά)
- Elateia (Ἐλάτεια), an ancient city-state of Phocis
- Elateia (Aeolis), a town of ancient Aeolis, now in Turkey
- Elateia (Epirus) (Ἐλάτεια), a town of ancient Epirus
- Elateia (Thessaly) (Ἐλάτεια), a town of ancient Thessaly
- Elateia, Florina (Ἐλάτεια), a destroyed village in the Florina region whose artifacts are held in the Museum of Folklore and History (Drosopigi)
- Elateia, Larissa (Ἐλάτεια), a village in the municipality of Larissa
- Amfikleia-Elateia
- Elateia, Phthiotis (Ἐλάτεια), a village in the Phthiotis region

== See also ==
- Elati (disambiguation)
