= Elati =

Elati (Greek: Ελάτη), may refer to several villages and a mountain in Greece:

- Elati (mountain), a mountain in the heart of the island of Lefkada
- Elati, Arcadia, a settlement in Arcadia
- Elati, Arta, a settlement in the Arta regional unit
- Elati, Ioannina, a settlement in the Ioannina regional unit
- Elati, Kozani, a village in the Kozani regional unit
- Elati, Trikala, a village in the Trikala regional unit
- Elate, a Greek mythological woman

== See also ==
- Elatia (disambiguation)
