= Elation =

Elation, Elate, or Elated may refer to:

- Happiness
- Elation (album), a 2012 album by Great White
- Carnival Elation, a cruise ship
- Elate (mythology), a minor figure in Greek mythology
- Elate (plant), or Phoenix, a genus of palms
- Elated!, a 2020 EP by Bea Miller

== See also ==
- Elater, a hygroscopic cell or cell structure
- Elater (beetle), a genus of click beetles
- Elatia (disambiguation), including uses of Elateia
- Euphoria (disambiguation)
