= Antonis Fosteridis =

Greek nationalist partisan, politician

- Ἀντώνης Φωστερίδης

Leader of the Nationalist Partisan Organizations grouping
- In office 1 January 1944 – 31 December 1944
- In office 1952–1958

Personal details
- Born: 1912 Bafra, Pontus, Ottoman Empire
- Died: 30 August 1979 (aged 66–67) Athens, Greece
- Cause of death: Cancer
- Citizenship: Ottoman; Greek
- Parent: Kyriakos Fosteridis (father)
- Occupation: Partisan leader Military officer Politician
- Nickname: Çauş Anton

Military service
- Allegiance: E.A.O.
- Battles/wars: World War II; Greek Civil War

Antonis Fosteridis (Greek: Ἀντώνης Φωστερίδης, also Φωστηρίδης, 1912–1979), also known by the nom de guerre of Çauş Anton (Τσαούς Αντών), was a Pontus-born Greek nationalist, anticommunist partisan during the Axis occupation of Greece, who served in the Hellenic Army during the Greek Civil War and, during peace time, was elected member of the Hellenic Parliament.

== Early years ==
Antonis Fosteridis (also Fostiridis) was born in 1912 in the village of Eroukli of the Bafra, Pontus region of the Ottoman Empire. His father Kyriakos fought with the Pontic irregulars against the Nationalist Turkish forces in the region in the period 1918–22, and emigrated to the Greek mainland with the enforcement of the population exchange between the two nations. The family, whose members were all mostly turkophone, stayed initially in the Oropedio village and then made its home at Krinides.

Fosteridis was enlisted in the Greek army and served as a sergeant of the artillery. (Note: The rank of sergeant in Turkish is Çavuş, from which Fosteridis' nickname "Çauş Anton", or sometimes "Anton Çauş," came. See Hondrokoukis (1993)) Ηe participated in the failed 1935 military coup attempt by officers loyal to Eleftherios Venizelos and was dishonorably discharged from the army.

When war was declared in October 1940 between Greece and Italy, Fosteridis was recalled and he took part in the battles fought in the mountains of Southern Albania. For the bravery he showed in combat, Fosteridis reached the rank of Second Lieutenant, the highest rank for an NCO.

== Armed action during the Axis Occupation ==
=== Historical background ===
On 6 April 1941, Germany invaded Greece. The war ended on the 1st of June of the same year with Greece's capitulation, after Crete was captured. The country was occupied by the European Axis powers and their allies. Bulgaria occupied and annexed the regions of Eastern Macedonia and Thrace. (Note: Except for the region running across the Evros river that borders Turkey, which was occupied by German troops. See Schrader (1999).)

Bulgaria integrated the occupied region as "new countries", carrying the title Belomórie (in Bulgarian Беломорие) (Note: From the Bulgarian term "Bialo Moré" (Бяло море) denoting the Aegean Sea.) and commenced a policy of violent assimilation of the native population. (Note: See also Bulgarisation.) The immediate result of the repressive measures was the exodus of a significant number of former local administrators of the Greek government, priests, teachers, physicians, business people, and others, who sought refuge mostly in German-occupied Macedonia. The occupying authorities forbid the use of the Greek language in all signs and official documents, and expropriated lands and houses owned by Greeks to settle there Bulgarian citizens.

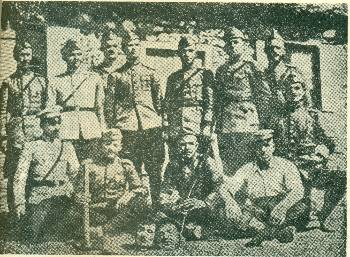
Bulgarian soldiers displaying partisans' severed heads, September 1941, Drama

In late September 1941, in reaction to these measures, small groups of partisans and irregulars, organized mostly by the Communist Party, attacked Bulgarian military, administrative, and police positions. The uprising initially broke out in the villages of Doxato, where local Greeks attacked the police station and killed six or seven Bulgarian policemen, and of Prosotsani where the municipality office, the army garrison, and the police station were attacked.

The uprising was "swiftly" and "brutally" suppressed by the Bulgarian occupation authorities. In a few days, by 2 October 1941, almost all the leaders of the various groups were killed. The Bulgarian troops moved into Drama where they arrested all men between the ages of 19 and 45, and into other cities and villages of the region. They commenced reprisals by summarily executing suspects, with Bulgarian military reports listing up to 1,600 Greeks killed in the uprising and in the weeks that followed, while Greek sources claim the dead were in the thousands. The villages of Doxato, Kyrgia, Philiatra, Drymotopos, Kokkinogeia, and Platanovryssi were destroyed and most male inhabitants killed. (Note: Greek sources note also the number of Jewish-Greeks, estimated at 4,058 persons, from that region who were subsequently sent to the Treblinka extermination camp in Poland and executed there. See Alexiadis (2018). See Encyclopedia of the Holocaust (2013).)

=== Nationalist partisan ===
In 1942, various nationalist groups, with the objective of defending the Greek population against the occupying authorities' continued "atrocities," as well as against "treasonous" communist activity, took up arms in the mountainous areas of Eastern Macedonia and Thrace, their most significant presence being in Pangaion, Elatia, and Lekani. The structure of their groups reflected that of patriarchal clans whence they originated. Αmong the first was Fosteridis who led a Pontic band of about 15-17 men mostly from Krinides.

In November 1942, Fosteridis was tried in absentia in a Bulgarian military court and convicted for sedition. (Note: Some Bulgarian and Greek historians point to evidence that Fosteridis had murdered his wife and took to the mountains to escape Bulgarian justice. See Hatzianastasiou (2008))

On 22 February 1943, the various nationalist bands of partisans, operating under the loosely unifying and unofficial title of "Nationalist Partisan Groups" (in Gr: Εθνικές Ανταρτικές Ομάδες, or Ε.Α.Ο.), unanimously recognized Fosteridis as their commander and co-coordinator, during a gathering at the village of Kastanitis of Chionovouni mountain. Fosteridis determined the area of activity for each of eight partisan commands. To increase the strength of their forces, Fosteridis contacted nationalist groups operating in German-occupied Macedonia, such as the PAO organization's band near Nigrita. In a short time, he managed to have agreeing to his leadership almost all nationalist bands in the region, whose main motive was to be able to withstand the perceived "increased aggressiveness" of ELAS.

=== Armed activity against Occupation forces and ELAS ===
In 1943, the military strength of ELAS in North Greece was limited, mainly due to the Communist party's support of an independent Macedonia nation, in force since 1924, that would encompass the Macedonian regions of Bulgaria, Greece, and Yugoslavia, as well as the great losses suffered by its members after the 1941 uprising. Τhis was true, for obvious reasons, for the Hellenophones of the region, while the KKE position enabled the party to gain some support among the Slavophones. (Note: In 1944, the ELAS majority in the region turned against and attacked its Slavophone members who supported Macedonian independence. See Koumaridis (2002))

In August 1943, a meeting between the various partisan organizations in the region, including ELAS and Fosteridis' EAO, with a representative of the Middle-East Allied Command present, took place in Pangaion and a unified front against the occupiers was agreed, though in terms undefined as to command and structure.

Beginning in late 1943, however, ELAS commenced efforts to absorb or violently disband all other partisan groups in the country. (Note: In the 2nd All-Greece Assembly of Communist Party delegates, held secretly in Athens, in December 1942, the party's Secretary General Georgios Siantos stated that "every [resistance] action must be undertaken exclusively through E.A.M." See Hatzis (1983).) By October 1943, Fosteridis brought under the EAO command more independent nationalist partisan groups. On 16 December 1943, ELAS troops attacked the Pangaion nationalist bands inflicting significant losses of life. Fosteridis rejected offers to join ELAS and managed to strengthen the resistance of the nationalists. A group of his partisans pretending to make peaceful overtures for a common celebration of New Year's Eve to an ELAS unit attacked and killed them on the dawn of 1 January 1944. This action was accompanied by economic assistance to the Fosteridis partisans by the British Allied Command, represented by Special Operations Executive Major Guy Micklethwait.

With the threat of ELAS eliminated, at least temporarily, the bands under Fosteridis' command undertook in the first half of 1944 a series of attacks against Bulgarian troops, engaging them in the battle at Kodja Orman between 16 and 20 February, the battle near Krinides on 20 May, and others.

The biggest engagement between Greek partisans and Axis forces during the Occupation was the battle at the Papades bridge, which lasted from 7 to 11 May 1944. The Bulgarian army, in order to begin anti-partisan operations in the Elatia region, decided to strengthen its forces by transferring troops there from Bulgaria. The EAO partisans positioned themselves around the bridge near the village of Papades and when the Bulgarian troops, supported by their air force, tried to occupy it and advance towards what they rightly considered to be EAO's main area of local support, were met with heavy gun and mortar fire. The repeated attempts to win the bridge lasted three days and nights of combat. Eventually, the partisans withdrew after inflicting heavy casualties to the attacking troops. Fifteen EAO partisans were killed while the attackers lost 42 officers and 806 soldiers. Afterwards, the occupying troops committed atrocities in most neighboring villages, as reprisals for their own losses.

For the Bulgarian side, the battle near Papades represented a strategic setback since they did not proceed towards the sea. In the 1946 Paris Peace Conference, the Bulgarian side, by then a member of the Allied camp, argued that they needed "an outlet on the Aegean Sea." Stalin, on 7 June 1946, told Dimitrov and Tito that the Soviet Union supported the Bulgarian claims, arguing, “we and the Americans were not parties to the [1919] drawing of the borders and do not recognize them as just." It has been argued that Britain, in opposing Bulgarian demands for access to the Aegean referenced the Papades battle and stated that Greece could not return in peace what it gained in war. Eventually, on 3 December 1946, the Council of Foreign Ministers that was convened in New York, rejected both Greece's and Bulgaria's post-war territorial claims against each other.

The departure of all Axis forces from Greece found Fosteridis of EAO, the nationalist partisans in Crete, and Napoleon Zervas leader of EDES practically the only non-communist partisans who survived the occupation after the civil conflict.

After Soviet forces, on 20 August 1944, broke through Axis defenses in Romania, and approached Bulgaria, the government in Sofia, on 27 August, announced neutrality; the last of the German troops departed, and, under intense Soviet pressure Bulgaria eventually declared war against Germany. on 7 September 1944. (Note: A move that, at least for one day, found the country at war against four major powers: Germany, Britain, the USA, and the USSR.) With Bulgaria having joined the Allied camp, at least as a "co-belligerent," the Bulgarian forces in Northern Greece started handing over civil command to EAM, the leftist national liberation front whose military wing was ELAS. Αfter an agreement between ELAS and the pro-communist Fatherland Front that had come to power in Sofia, ELAS began liberating cities in Macedonia and Thrace, with only the situation in Drama remaining uncertain. Fosteridis, jointly with the British military representative, attempted to prevent ELAS from entering Drama by coming to an agreement with General Asen Sirakov, while EAO members, joined by the British officer himself, went to the Bulgarian capital with the same purpose. These efforts failed so after a few days ELAS troops entered Drama, while, by December 1944, and following the events in Athens, ELAS commenced liquidating operations against the EAO groups in the area. The last Bulgarian troops were evacuated from Greece by 25 October 1944. (Note: The Germans evacuated Athens on 12 October 1944, and, by the end of the month, they had withdrawn completely from mainland Greece, with only some garrisons left on Aegean islands that remained there until the end of the war.)

=== Accusations of collaboration ===
During the internecine conflict in the time of the Occupation and continuing after the war ended in Greece, Fosteridis and the EAO partisans were accused by the communist resistance of being "collaborators" and "traitors." The Communist Party stated that Fosteridis received monetary support from the Germans in order to fight against ELAS during the war and then, after the Germans had left, by the British for the same purpose. Fosteridis, in the prevailing historiography of the Greek left, is denounced as being an "extreme rightist," for receiving more money from the British than ELAS despite his comparatively much smaller force, (Note: The Greek left has denounced Fosteridis partisans as being a "gang" (συμμορίτες), a term implying illegal activities, which was subsequently used by the Greek government to smear the communist partisans.) and for getting support from the German forces, even though his activities had been confined within the Bulgarian-occupied zone. There has been no material or documented evidence of Fosteridis getting assistance from Occupation forces. He came to several understandings with them, ostensibly with military objectives, such as the agreement with General Asen Sirakov for the delivery of Drama. He was not among those who were indicted after the war as collaborators. (Note: A significant number of known collaborators, after the Occupation ended, were not tried, or were tried and either were found not guilty or received light sentences. See Kousouris (2013))

== Civil War ==
When the civil war started in Greece in 1946, Fosteridis organized a paramilitary group of anti-communist fighters, titled "Fosteridis Battalion," which undertook various actions in Eastern Macedonia and Thrace, and particularly in Evros Prefecture, in support of government operations. This paramilitary formation was accused of committing during the civil war numerous and serious atrocities against both enemy combatants and civilians.

== Member of Parliament ==
In the 1952 general election, Fosteridis was elected member of Parliament for Drama, under the Greek Rally party led by Alexandros Papagos, former Field Marshal of the Greek Army and commander of the government forces during the Civil War. In July 1955, he joined the Progressive Party led by Spyros Markezinis.

== Death ==
On 30 August 1979, Fosteridis died in Athens from cancer and was buried in Drama.

== Military awards and legacy ==
For his "services to the national cause," Fosteridis, after the Civil War ended with the victory of the government side, was appointed honorary Artillery Colonel and awarded the Silver War Cross and the Silver Cross of Valour. The partisan organization he commanded was recognized by successive Greek governments as part of the legitimate National Resistance. (Note: In 1949 under Law 971, in 1966 under Law 179, and in 1982 with Law 1285. See Georgiadis (2021)) Ιn 2019, the Drama mayoralty considered a proposal by EAO veterans to dedicate a statue to Fosteridis in a city square but after protests from the Communist Party and organizations of Resistance veterans the proposal was rejected.

== See also ==
- Security Battalions
- Pontic Greek genocide
- EKKA
- PAO
