= Nikolaos Manos =

- Νικόλαος Μάνος
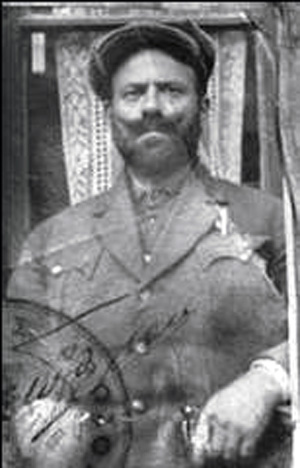
- Manos during the Macedonian Struggle.
- Born: c. late 1800s Balkameni Monastir Vilayet, Ottoman Empire (now Drosopigi, Greece)
- Military career
- Allegiance: Kingdom of Greece
- Branch: Hellenic Army
- Unit: 5th Infantry Division
- Conflicts: Macedonian Struggle; Balkan Wars; First Balkan War

Nikolaos Manos (Greek: Νικόλαος Μάνος) was a significant Greek chieftain of the Macedonian Struggle.

== Biography ==
Manos was born in the late 19th century in Belkameni (now Drosopigi) of Florina. He acted as a messenger, guide and a soldier in various armed groups operating in the area of Florina, from April 1905 to November 1907. Following the suggestion of Nikolaos Andrianakis, he set up his own armed group and became its leader. His group gave many battles against Bulgarian komitadjis. He also assassinated a high-ranked Ottoman official in Neveska (now Nymfaio), Zenel Bey. He was arrested by the Ottoman authorities in April 1910 and imprisoned in Bodrum. He was released in the same year (even though he was sentenced to 10 years imprisonment), as Mehmed V gave amnesty to those who had been convicted for political crimes. He returned to his home town and continued his armed action. He assassinated Drosopigi's president, S. Mihalalezis as a pro-Romanian agent, spreading propaganda to Greek and Aromanian populations, as well as a partner of the Ottomans in many cases, expelling the Greeks of the village.

In 1912 Manos was forced to flee to Larisa. He returned to the region, with his own armed group during the First Balkan War. His team acted in the regions of Kastoria and Florina throughout the First Balkan War, fighting against the Ottoman troops. He also undertook several missions assigned to him by the 5th Infantry Division.

== Sources ==
- Αρχείο Διεύθυνσης Εφέδρων Πολεμιστών Αγωνιστών Θυμάτων Αναπήρων (ΔΕΠΑΘΑ), Αρχείο Μακεδονικού Αγώνα, φ. Μ-542
- John S. Koliopoulos (editor), Αφανείς, γηγενείς Μακεδονομάχοι, Εταιρεία Μακεδονικών Σπουδών, University Studio Press, Thessaloniki, 2008, p. 167-168
