= Drosopigi, Florina =

Drosopigi Δροσοπηγή
- Community
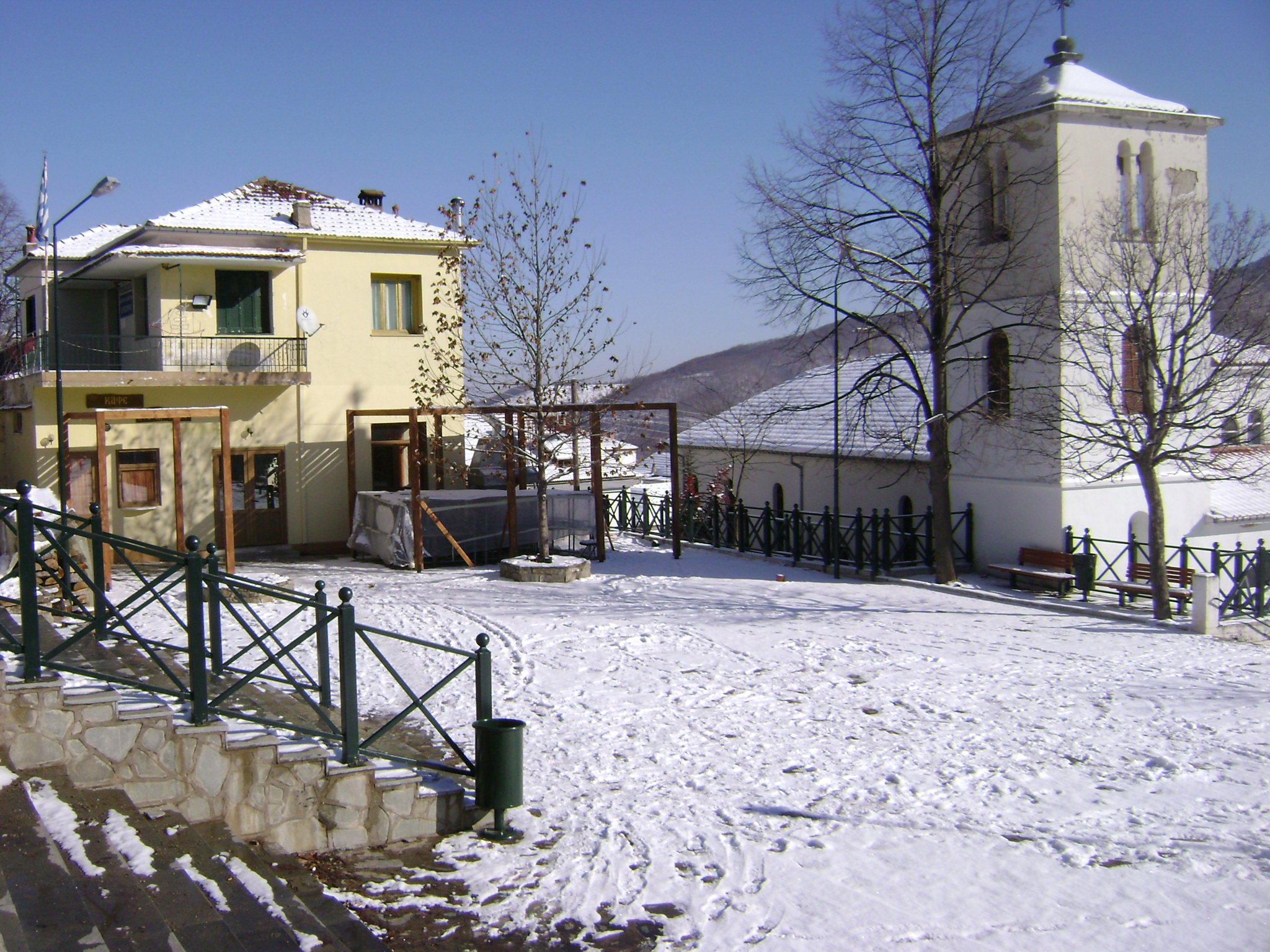
- Church in Drosopigi

- Location within Greece
- Coordinates: 40°40′N 21°29′E
- Country: Greece
- Geographic region: Macedonia
- Administrative region: Western Macedonia
- Regional unit: Florina
- Municipality: Florina
- Municipal unit: Perasma
- Elevation: 1,050 m (3,440 ft)

Population (2021)
  - Community: 153
- Time zone: UTC+2 (EET)
  - Summer (DST): UTC+3 (EEST)
- Postal code: 531 00
- Area code: 23850
- Vehicle registration: ΡΑ
- Website: dim-drosop.flo.sch.gr

Drosopigi (Greek: Δροσοπηγή, before 1928: Μπελκαμένη – Belkameni; Albanian: Bellkamen; Aromanian: Belkamen; from the Slavic: Бел Камен, meaning "White Stone") is a village in Macedonia, Greece. It lies in the central part of Florina regional unit, as part of the Florina municipal unit. The village's year round population is estimated at 150 people, but in the summer it grows to nearly 400. Drosopigi lies on eastward slope of Mount Vitsi at an elevation of 1050 meters approximately 13 km from Florina.

== History ==
=== The old village ===
Belkameni was established between 1843 and 1844. It was the first village, the second being Negovani in 1861, within the area to be founded by a bilingual Arvanite (Albanian and Greek-speeking) population along with some Aromanians and a few others. The village population originated from Konitsa kaza (district) in Eprius, mainly from the bilingual village of Plikati and others from nearby Aromanian villages of Mount Gramos, having together left due to pressure from Muslim Albanians of the Kolonjë region in the mid nineteenth century. The village in Ottoman Turkish was called Belkamen.

Belkameni was a partially Albanian speaking village of the Florina area. In statistics gathered by Vasil Kanchov in 1900, Belkameni was populated by 560 Christian Albanians and 100 Aromanians.

In the early twentieth century, the majority of the migrant Albanian community (some 200 people) in Brăila, Romania was composed of people from Belkameni and nearby Negovani. Migrants from Belkameni and Negovani in Brăila founded a society (1904) named Djalëria (The Youth) and it was financed by Romanian Prince Albert Ghica.

Athanasios Papastyliadis (1875-1939), master builder, practical architect, building contractor, merchant, organizer and collaborator of Pavlos Melas in the Macedonian Struggle

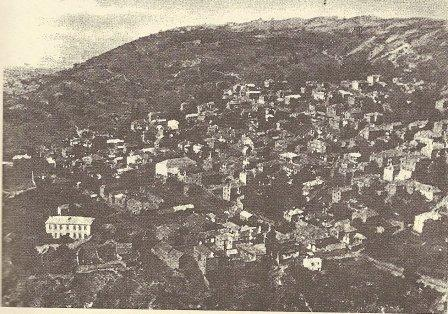
Belkameni, 1890

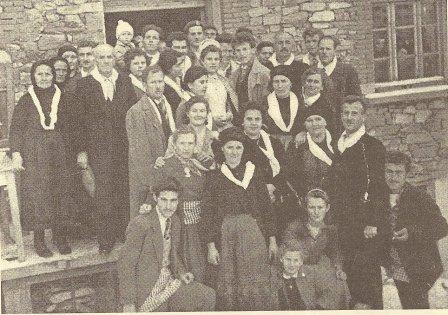
Wedding in Belkameni

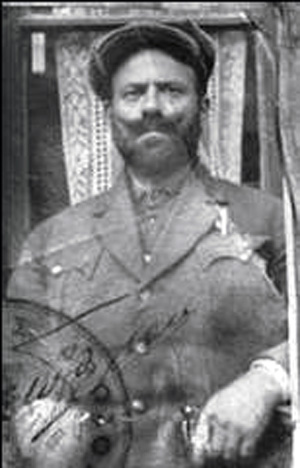
Greek revolutionary Nikolaos Manos

Belkameni participated extensively on the Greek side of the Macedonian Struggle in the late Ottoman period. Moreover, many locals of Drosopigi joined the Greek Struggle as fighters or agents.

Following the Young Turk Revolution (1908), the Greek clergy's prominent position in places like Belkameni was contested by Aromanian and Albanian nationalists. An Albanian school was established in Belkameni and located in the same building as the Romanian school.

The village also produced many painters and icon painters, some of whom may have learned their craft from the icon painters of Chionades, a neighboring village to Plikati, while others studied it on Mount Athos. Two icon-painter's workshops operated in Karyes on Mount Athos from the last quarter of the 19th century until the 1920s. The older one was that of Stylianos Styliadis [Στυλιανός Στυλιάδης] (1850–1910 — who later adopted the surname Zografos [Ζωγράφος]), together with his sons Stergios (Στέργιος) Pantelis (Παντελής), and Thomas (Θωμάς), and Athanasios Charisis (Αθανάσιος Χαρίσης). The second was that of Markos Styliadis [Μάρκος Στυλιάδης] (1856–1926), with his son Anastasios [Αναστάσιος] (1896–1966), his son-in-law Konstantinos Tziatzios [Κωνσταντίνος Τζιάτζιος] (1895–1965), and his fellow villager Charisios Charisis [Χαρίσιος Χαρίσης] (1883–1970). Students of the latter three were the painters Vangelis Tamoutselis (Βαγγέλης Ταμουτσέλης) and Nikolaos Zografos (Νικόλαος Ζωγράφος) from Florina.

=== Life in the old village ===
Life for the villagers of Drosopigi was very difficult at times. The village was built on the side of the mountain so it could be hidden from the Ottoman Turks. Many of these villagers had massive gardens on which they grew their crops. These included potatoes, carrots, lettuce and other varieties of crops. The sun only hit the village a certain time of day, which made the production of prosperous crops a tremendous challenge. During the late 19th century, many men from the village went to the Kingdom of Romania to work, make money, and bring it back with them. As many other men did, Nikolaos Manou and Vasilios Dedes worked in Romania, were very prosperous, and sent great amounts of money back to the village for their families.

With the establishment of the Socialist Republic of Romania these men lost everything they had in the Romanian banks. Many families suffered from that loss.

The village itself was a mini city. Holidays like Easter, Christmas were great events for the villagers as was Agia Triada (Holy Trinity), a special celebration to honor the village church. Agia Triada was celebrated fifty days after Easter, over the span of three days, and is an event that is celebrated to this day in modern Drosopigi.

=== Burning of the old village ===
World War II engulfed Europe and Drosopigi, like the rest of Greece was affected. In the Battle of Greece (6–30 April 1941), the country faced three Axis powers: Nazi Germany, the Kingdom of Italy and the Kingdom of Bulgaria. Their alliance won the conflict and established an Axis occupation of Greece. They divided Greece into occupation zones. Drosopigi was included in the German occupation zone. On April 3, 1944 the Germans sent a routine Wehrmacht patrol to the surrounding area of Drosopigi, outside the village itself. Local members of the Greek Resistance captured five soldiers and executed them - three of them were outside the village, one in the cemetery and one on the road (Kangeli) leading to the village. The women of the village went to where the German soldiers were, shot and cleaned up the blood. The people from the village took the dead bodies and hid them in fertilizer. The Germans quickly concluded that Drosopigi was the place where their soldiers went missing. They demanded an explanation from the villagers and they refused to say anything. Many, fearing reprisals, fled Drosopigi. The men went hiding in the forest and most of the women and children went to Elatia, a small village near Drosopigi. When the Germans arrived seeking retribution they found mostly old people. They killed one elderly lady and one male. On April 4, 1944 the village of Drosopigi was burned by the Germans in reprisal.

Following the German devastation of Drosopigi, the people of the village set out to rebuild it to its original state. From April 1944 until April 1947 the villagers focused on rebuilding. The end of World War II was followed in Greece by the Greek Civil War between the Democratic Army of Greece and the National Army. In the first stages of the civil war, many communist-led guerrillas stopped at the village as a hiding place. On April 7, 1947, the Greek government under Dimitrios Maximos adopted a policy of forced relocation for certain villages that were strategic for the guerrillas, and ordered the inhabitants of Drosopigi to gather their belongings and to vacate the village. It was decided to move most of the inhabitants to the village of Skopia, Florina.

=== The Great Move ===
After the Greek Government adopted a policy of forced relocation of certain villages, the National Army of Greece, in April 1947, moved the villagers from Drosopigi to the village of Skopia where they would stay till late 1950/51. By 1951, most villagers moved yet again to another village known as Kato Idroussa (Kotori). It was at this time that a final decision was made to build a new village at the current location of Drosopigi. Life at Skopia was very hard for everyone from Drosopigi. In Skopia, an entire family, often as many as 8 people, was assigned to one room to live in. Also constant conflict was going on in the mountains around Skopia between the two factions of the civil war and morale in Greece was low.

In Skopia many families received aid from the United States that originated from the Truman Doctrine, which would allow 100 million dollars in aid to go to Greece and Turkey. Families all across Greece received some sort of aid. In Skopia families received aid through food rations, clothing, and other important items. During the Greek Civil War, many Greeks would lose their lives and many people from the village of Drosopigi fought on both sides. A total of eleven Drosopigites died in the Greek Civil War. On the National Army side, four died including Evangelos Harisis (Ευάγγελος Χαρίσης), Anastasios Harisis (Αναστάσιος Χαρισης), and Konstantinos Stathopoulos (Κωνσταντίνος Σταθόπουλος) and Dimitios Theodorou (Δημἠτριος Θεοδώρου). On the partisan side, seven died including Anastasios Styliades (Αναστάσιος Στυλιάδης), Antonis Zikos (Αντώνης Ζήκος), two brothers of the Nastou family (Δύο άδελφοί Νάστου), and Sotirios Theodorou (Σωτήριος Θεοδώρου).

After two years, people from the old village wanted to move on. From 1951 until 1952 many families started to build their new homes so they could have some sort of shelter to live in. As the construction of new homes finished, people began to move into the new village, and shortly thereafter it became known as new Drosopigi. Many of the original families from the old village established themselves in the new village.

Kalfas' Bridge at Drosopigi (1852)

=== Present ===
Old Drosopigi. New church (1980s or 1990s) inside the old one (1853

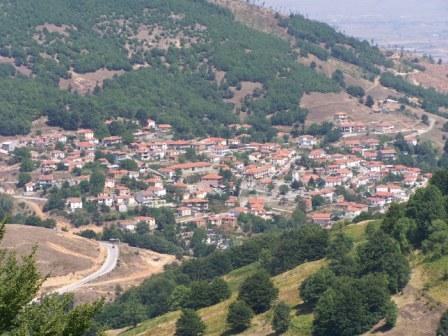
New Drosopigi

Ruins of Athanasios Papastyliadis' mansion (late 19th cent.) at Old Drosopigi

Bell-tower of the old church at Old Drosopigi

Folklore-Museum at Drosopigi

From the time new Drosopigi was built (1951/1952) the people worked hard to make it aesthetically pleasing, but would not reach the look of the old village.

In the 1950s and 1960s, many families, because of economic conditions, from all around Greece started to emigrate, becoming part of the Greek diaspora. Individuals and families who emigrated from Drosopigi mostly went to the United States, Canada, West Germany, and Australia in search of a new life. Some went with the intention to make money and return, but many did not return to Greece and left their villages permanently.

There are still people who live there but unlike the numbers of the early twentieth century. The ruins of the old village remain untouched. Family members long buried there have not been disinterred. The former large village lies in ruins and nearby is the new village were the people of Drosopigi now live.

== Diaspora ==
At present, the city of Rochester, New York has the largest concentration of immigrants and families that trace their roots to Drosopigi. Many people still visit Drosopigi. The Society was organised in the year 1951 by immigrants who came over from Drosopigi. These were among the first to settle in the Rochester area. The initial goal of the membership was to assist in the rebuilding of the town of Drosopigi that was completely destroyed during the War between the Germans and Civil War. Among the projects that were supported were the reconstruction of the public school and of the Church of the Holy Trinity. Other projects were to supply the village with water supply and electrical power. In addition, the members supported relatives and friends back home in Drosopigi through financial help and other types of aid. In Rochester, the Drosopigi Society has been and still is one of the most active community organisations within the Greek Community in Rochester. One strong quote from the Drosopigi people is as follows, "What we inherited from our forefathers, we have given to our children and they are ready to hand it to their children so that they, in turn, will continue our customs and traditions into the future with zeal and enthusiasm."

Presently, the society is active and hosts many special occasions such as the Holy Trinity, one of the most important traditions held by the Drospigiotes. They also host Christmas parties and picnics to help bring together all the families of Drosopigi. They have assisted in successfully rebuilding Drosopigi in Greece and still send aid to help the village in many projects. The society also helps in many projects here in America such as contributing to the addition of new mosaics in the Greek Orthodox Church of the Annunciation in Rochester New York. Today the Society is led by Δημήτρης Καρράς (Dimitri Karras) and many other elected officials. The society also operates the Museum of Folklore and History (Drosopigi).

== Demographics ==
In fieldwork done by anthropologist Riki Van Boeschoten in late 1993, Drosopigi was populated by Arvanites. Arvanitika (close to Albanian) was spoken in the village by people over 30 in public and private settings. Children understood the language, but mostly did not use it. Aromanian was spoken by people over 60, mainly in private.

Historical population
Year	Pop.	±%
1913	1,364	—
1920	770	−43.5%
1928	752	−2.3%
1940	765	+1.7%
1961	581	−24.1%
1971	421	−27.5%
1981	364	−13.5%
1991	327	−10.2%
2001	337	+3.1%
2011	239	−29.1%
2021	153	−36.0%

== Culture ==
In trilingual Drosopigi, there is an older integration of Greek songs. Most Arvanite songs are sung with exactly the same melody as in Aromanian. The village has not been influenced by the nearby predominant Slavic musical tradition of the area, and villagers have no knowledge of songs from their neighbours. Dances performed in Drosopigi are the Berati, Hasapia, Tsamiko, Kalamatiano, along with the Poustseno.

Like the main church of the old village (erected in 1853), the present one (dating from 1953) is also dedicated to the Holy Trinity. While churches dedicated to it celebrate their feast day on the Monday of the Holy Spirit, the church and the village celebrate on Tuesday, the following day, because, according to local tradition, the large icon of the Holy Trinity arrived there on that day, either from Plikati or from Mount Athos. The same icon adorns the new church as well.

== Notable people ==
- Ioannis Stylianou, self-taught architect and master builder of 19th century
- Athanasios Papastyliadis, self-taught architect, master builder, merchant and collaborator and organizer for Pavlos Melas in the Macedonian Struggle
- Spiro Bellkameni, activist of the Albanian National Awakening
- Nikolaos Manos, Greek chieftain of the Macedonian Struggle

== Gallery ==
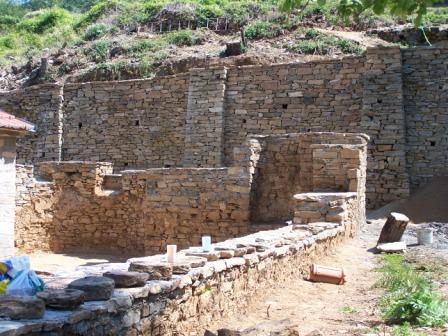

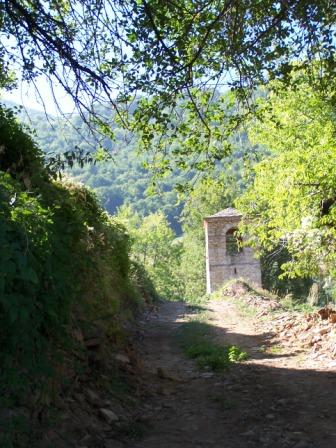

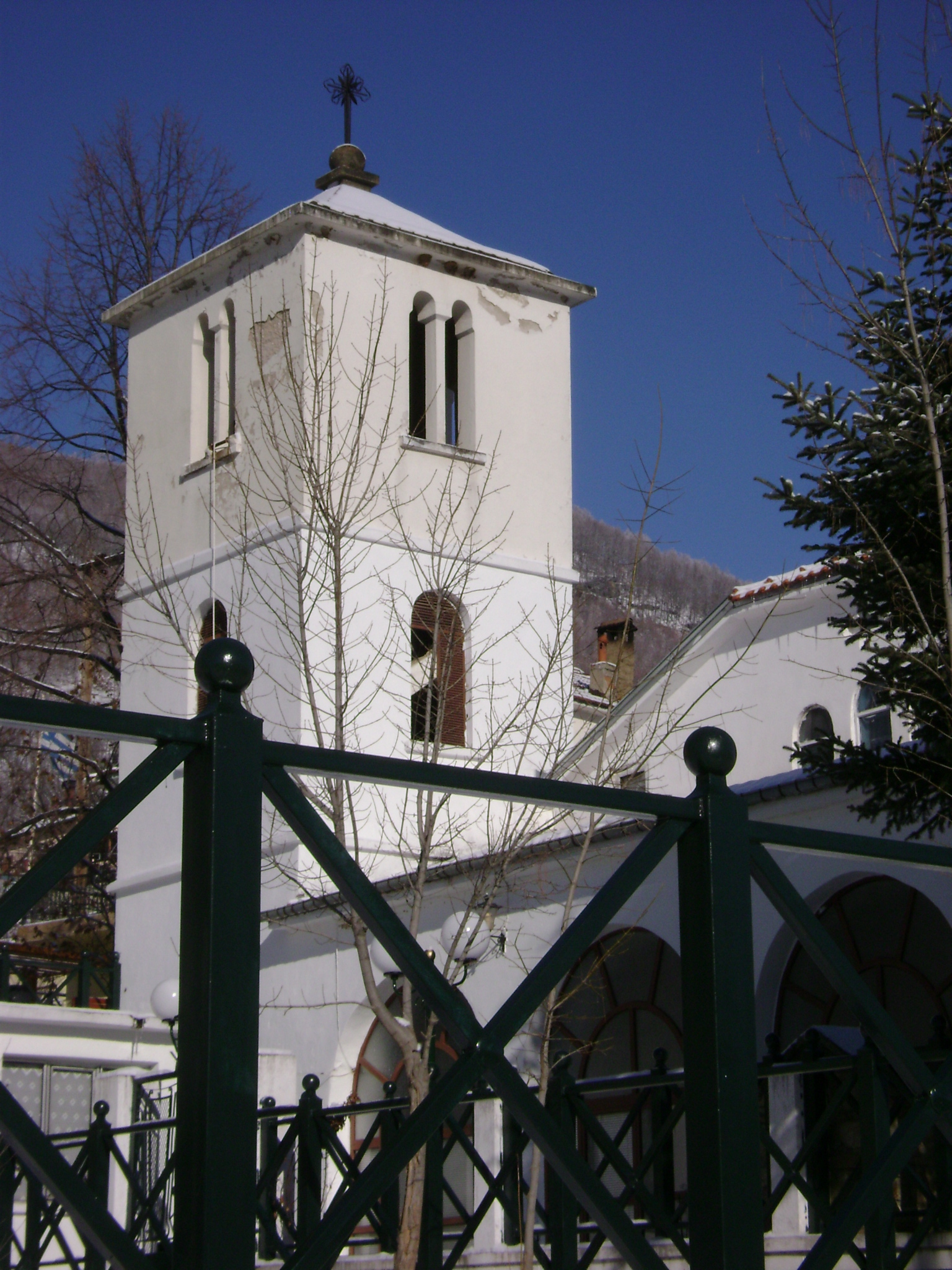

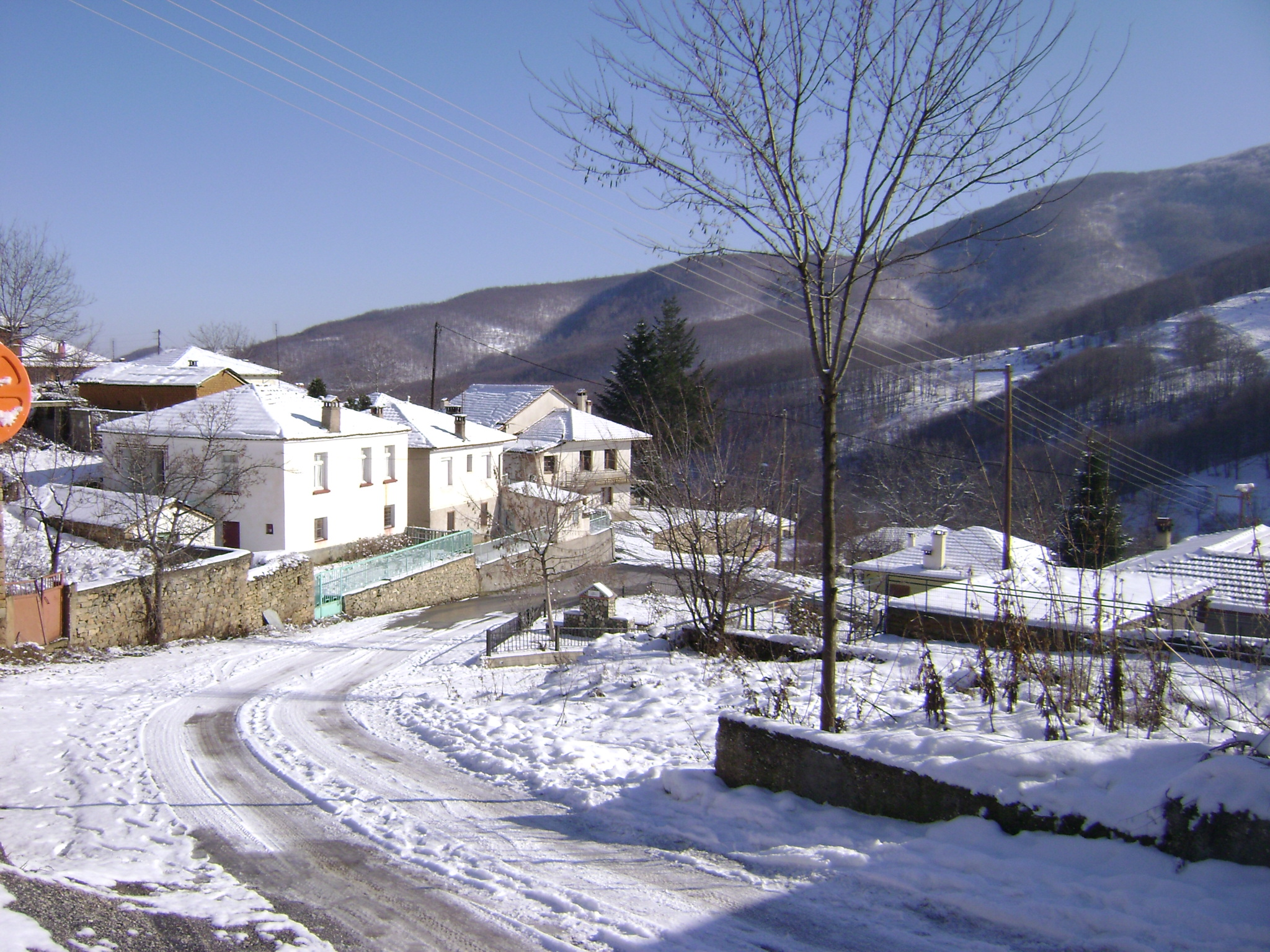

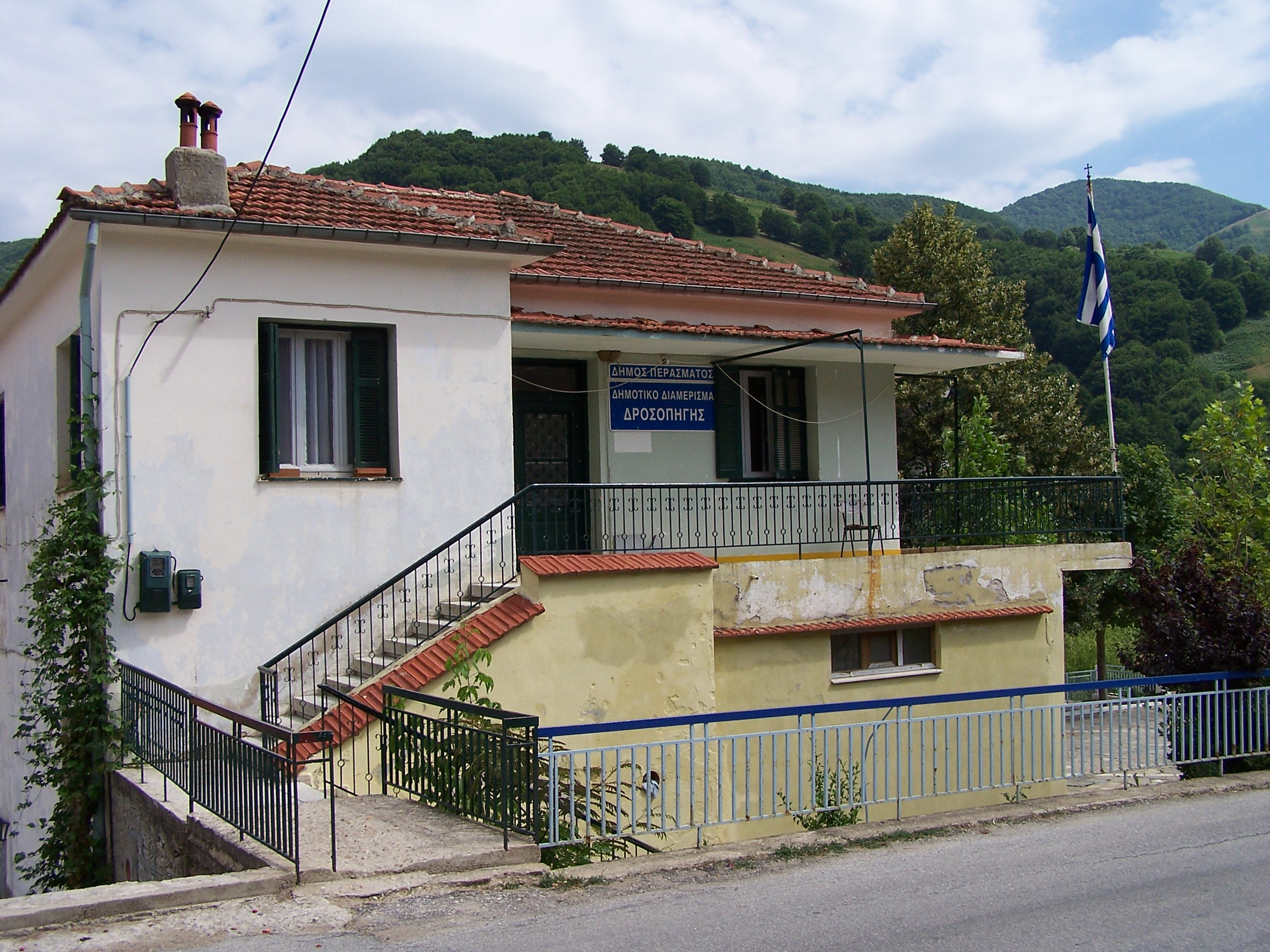

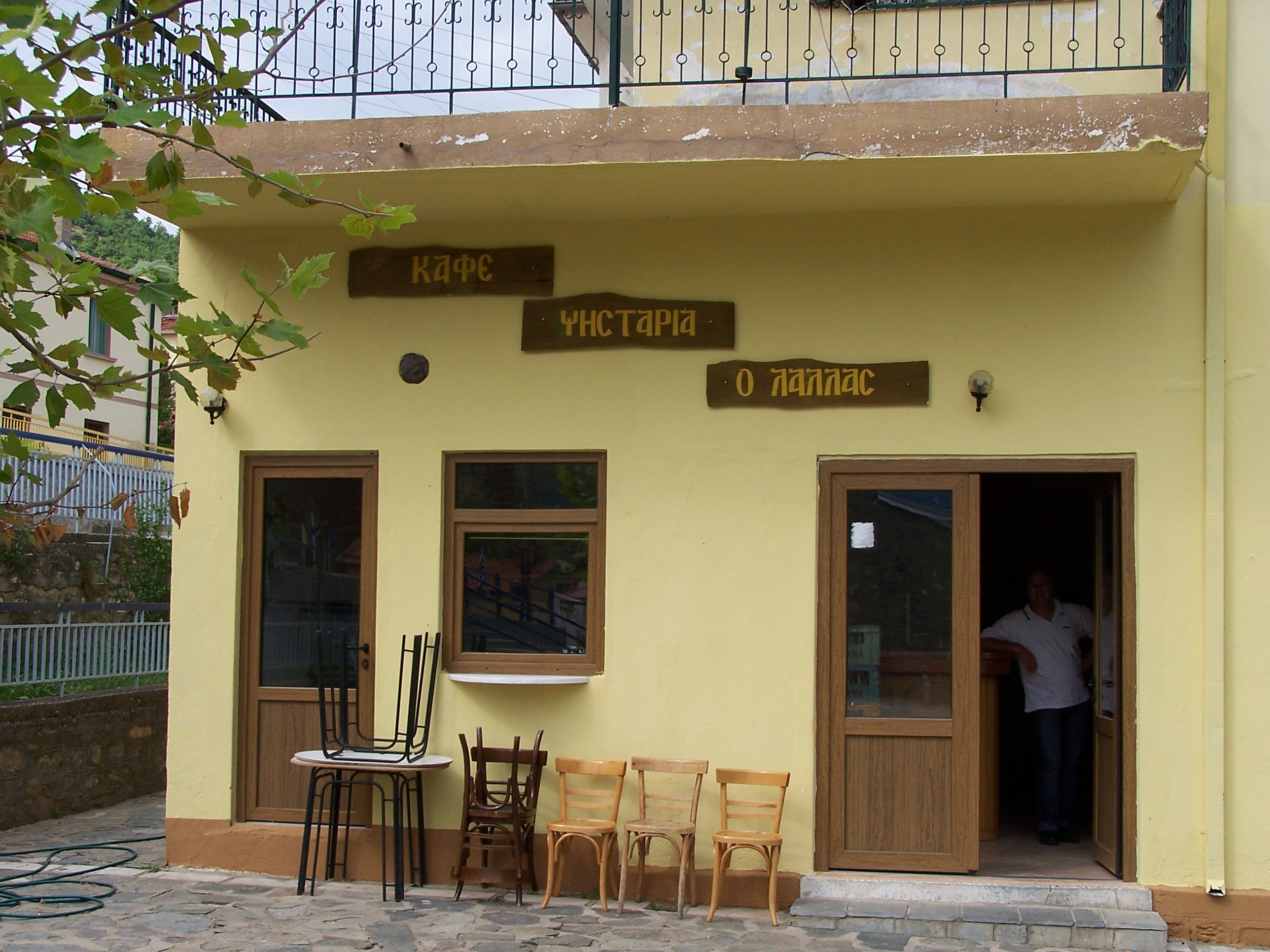

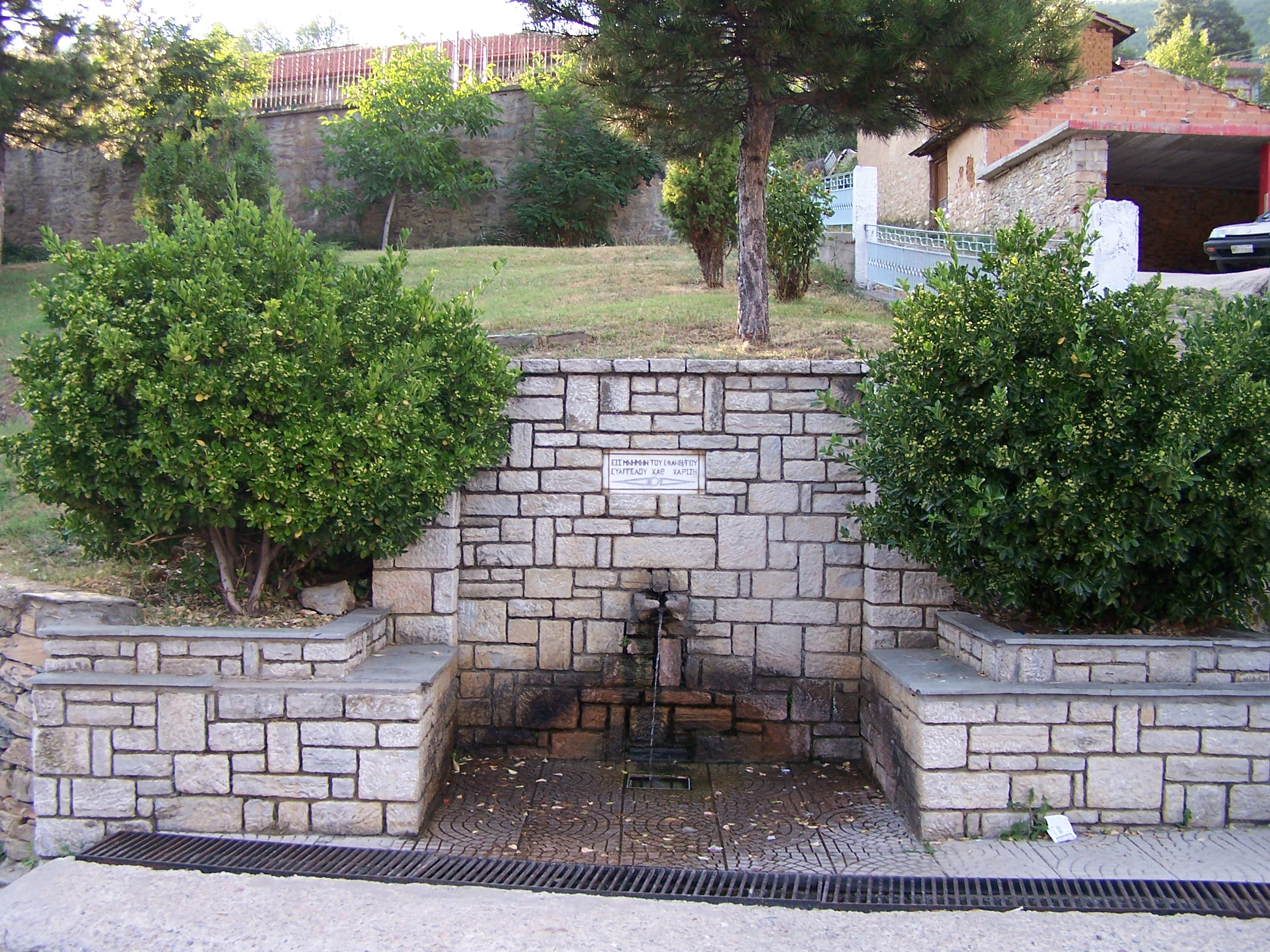
