= Elati, Kozani =

Elati Ελάτη
- Community
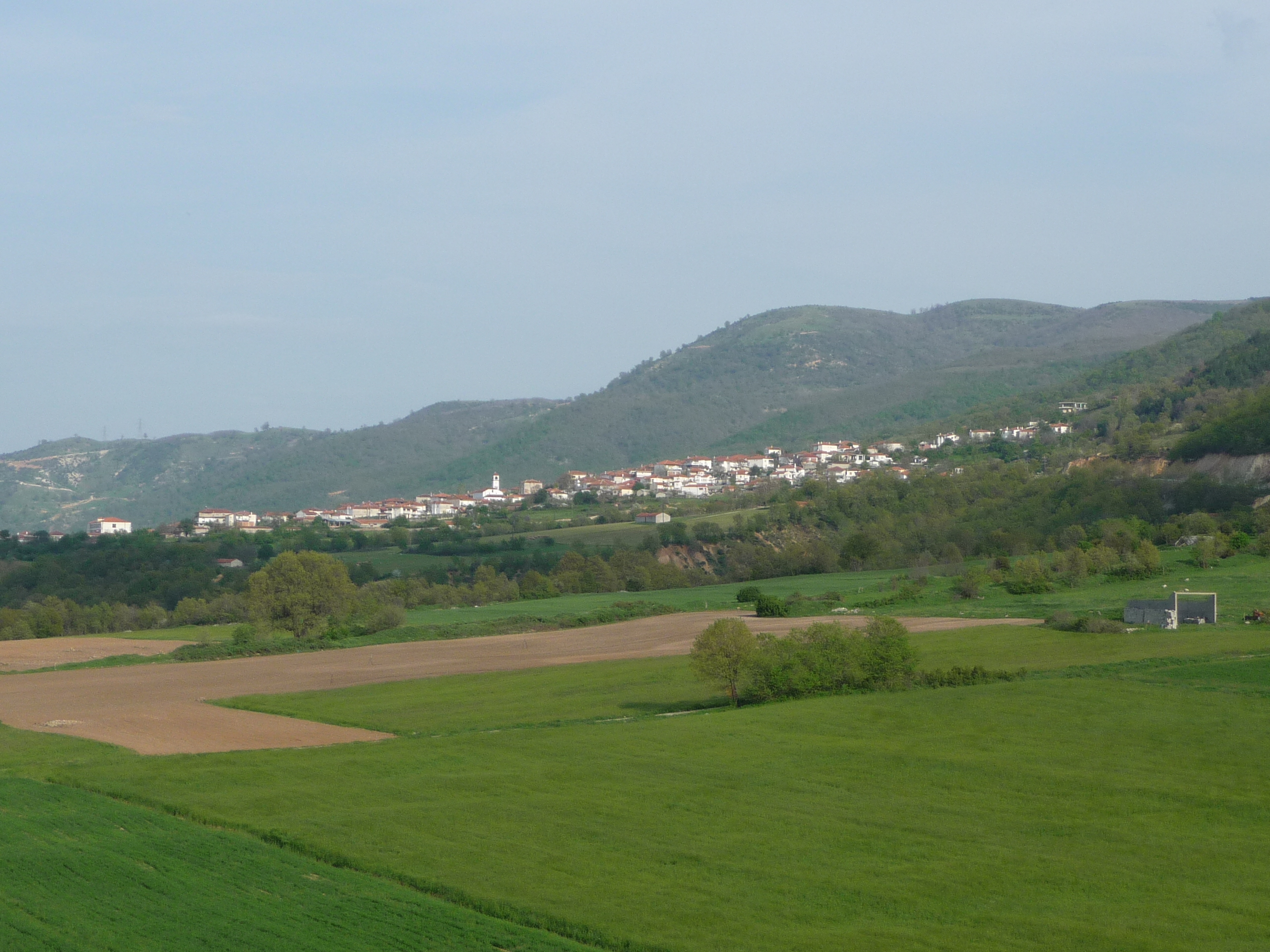
- Elati seen from the west

- Seal

- Location within Greece
- Coordinates: 39°58′N 21°49′E
- Country: Greece
- Administrative region: West Macedonia
- Regional unit: Kozani
- Municipality: Servia
- Municipal unit: Kamvounia

Area
  - Community: 40.0 km^{2} (15.4 sq mi)
- Elevation: 650 m (2,130 ft)

Population (2021)
  - Community: 338
  - Density: 8.45/km^{2} (21.9/sq mi)
- Time zone: UTC+2 (EET)
  - Summer (DST): UTC+3 (EEST)
- Postal code: 505 00
- Area code: +30 24640
- Vehicle registration: ΚΖ

Elati (Greek: Ελάτη, before 1928: Greek: Λουζιανή Louziani) is a village in the Kozani regional unit, Greece. It is part of the municipal unit Kamvounia.

== Gallery ==
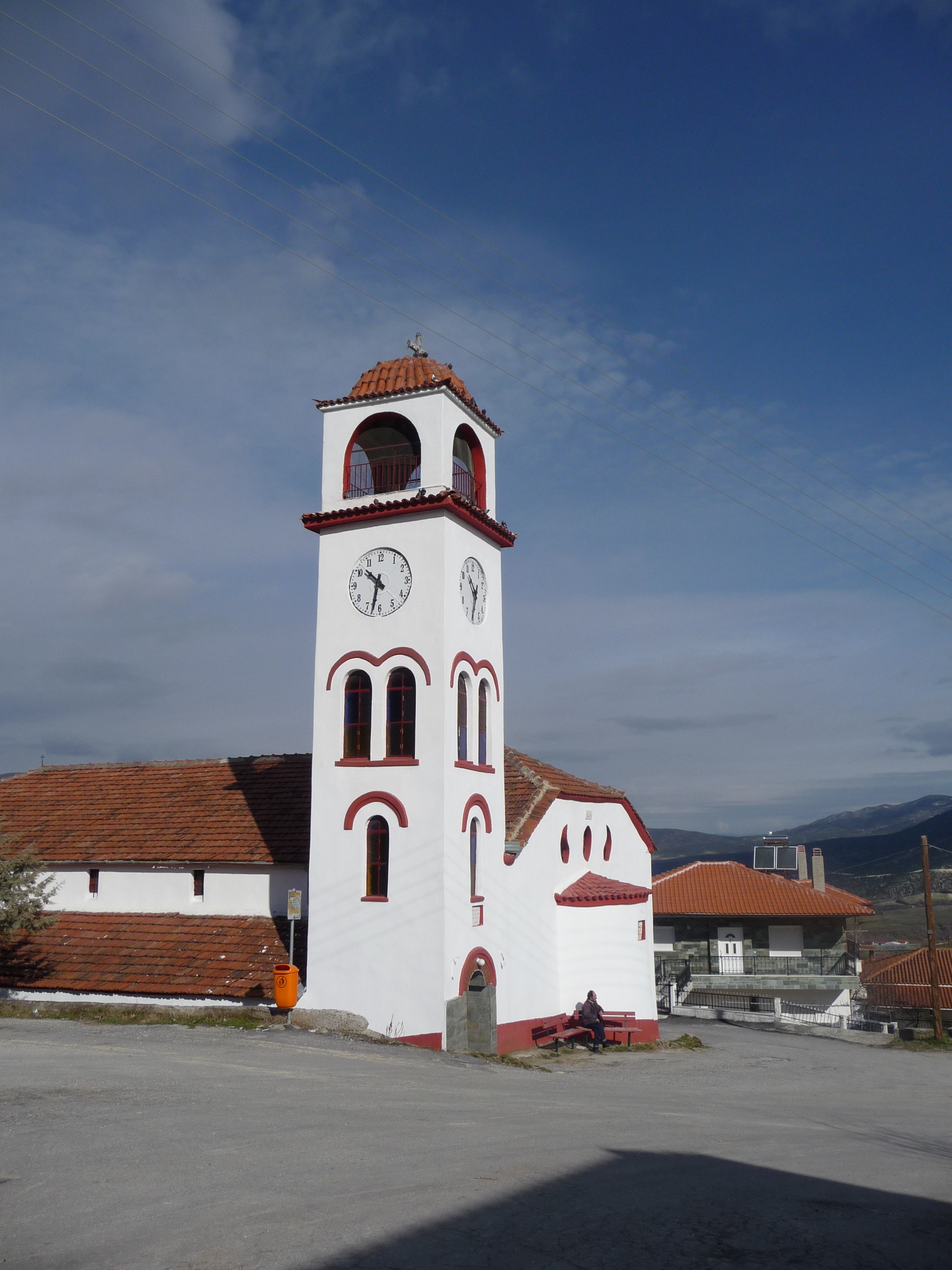
Metamorphosis Church in Elati 2009

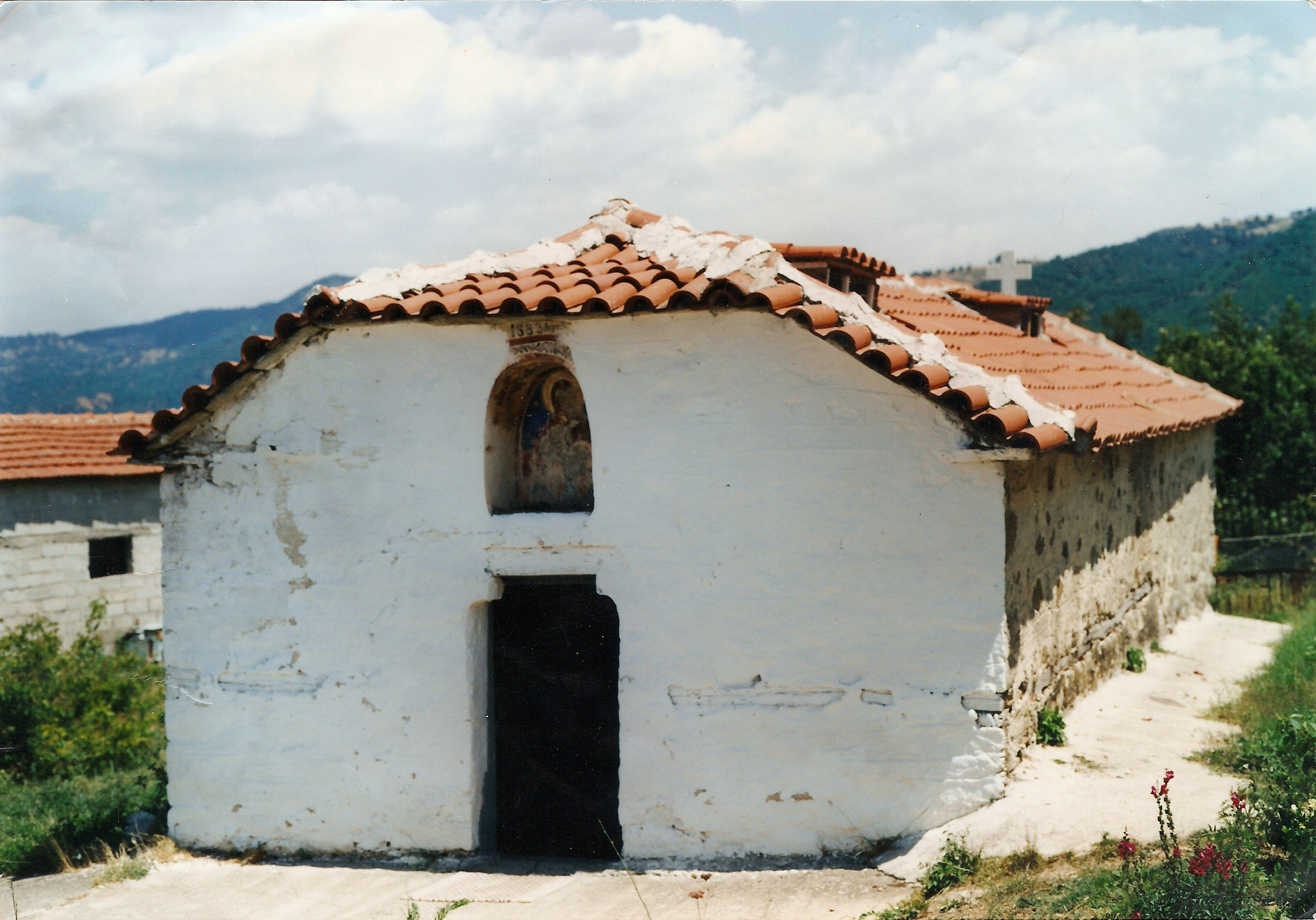
Saint Paraskevi's Church

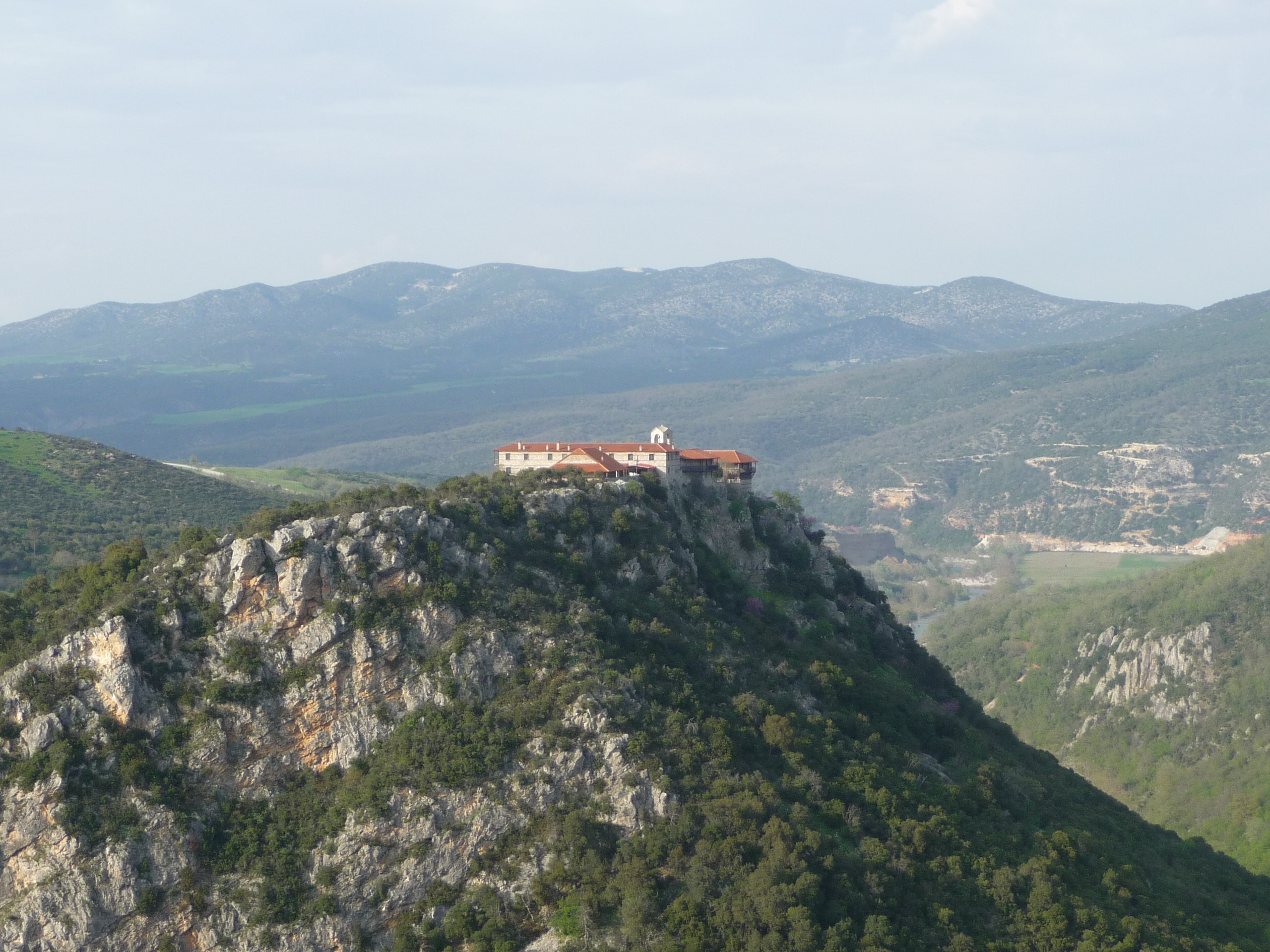
Saint Nikanoras Monastery west of Elati 2009

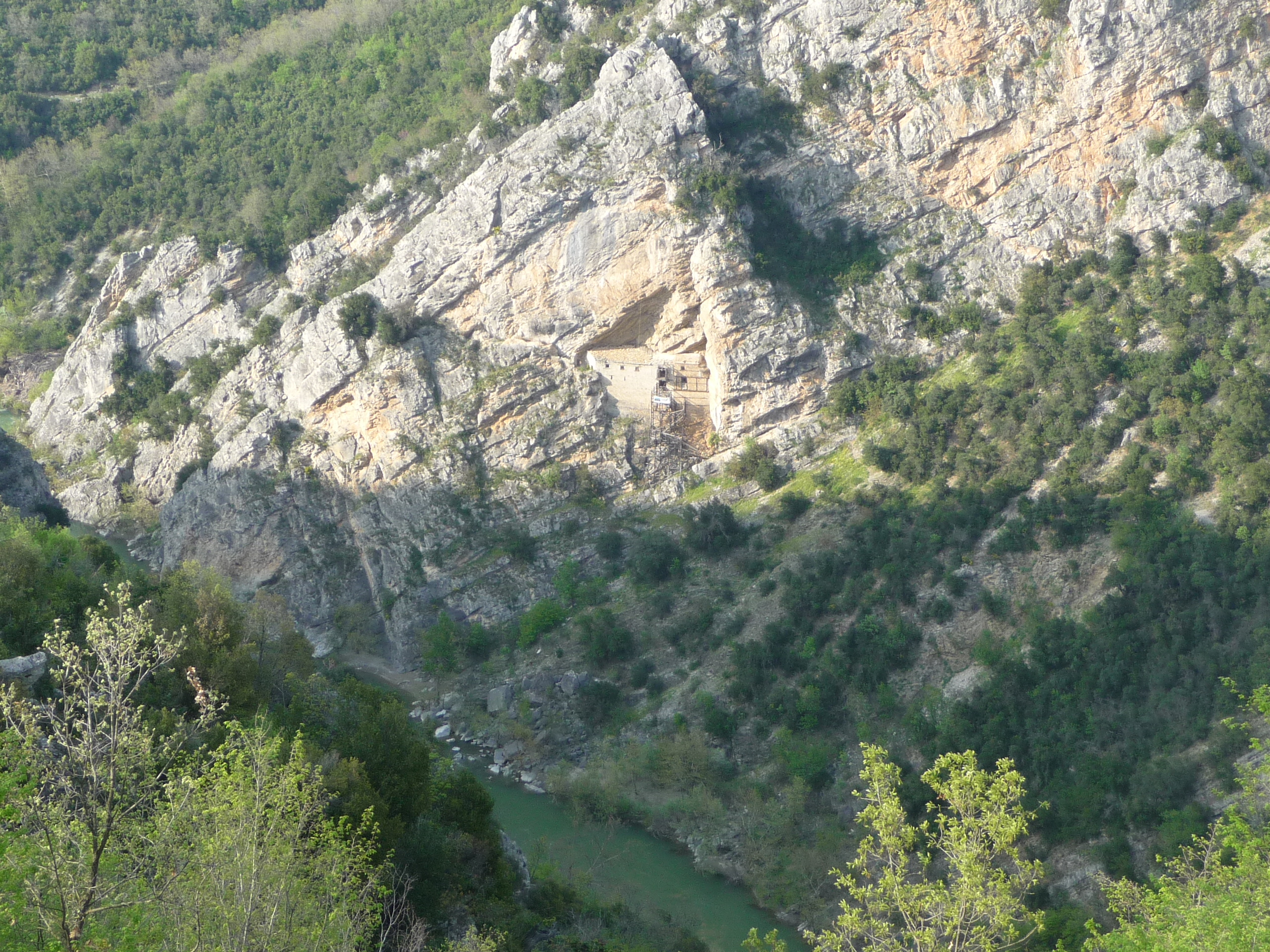
Hermitage close to Elati 2009

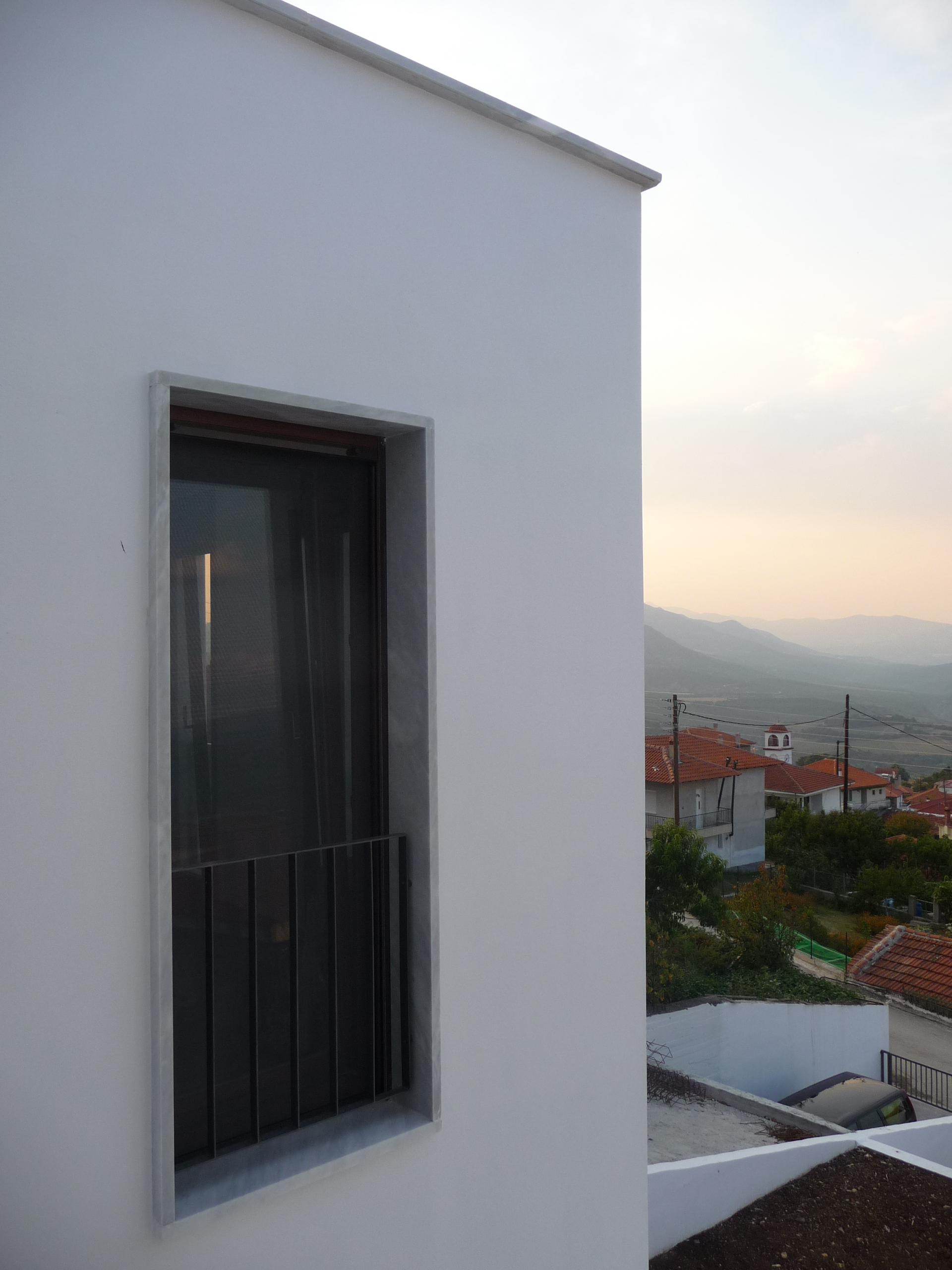
View over Elati into the valley 2009

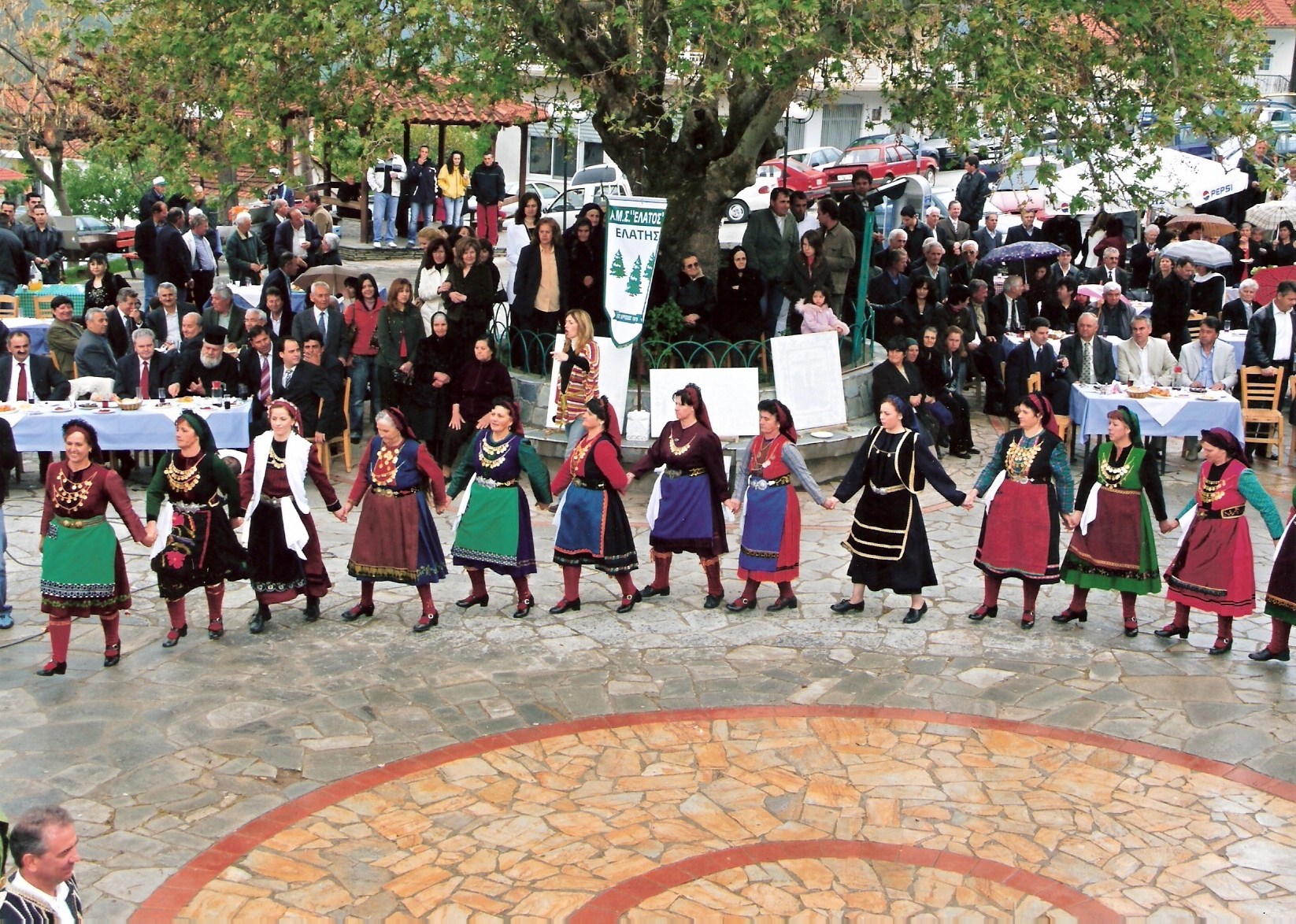
Traditional dances

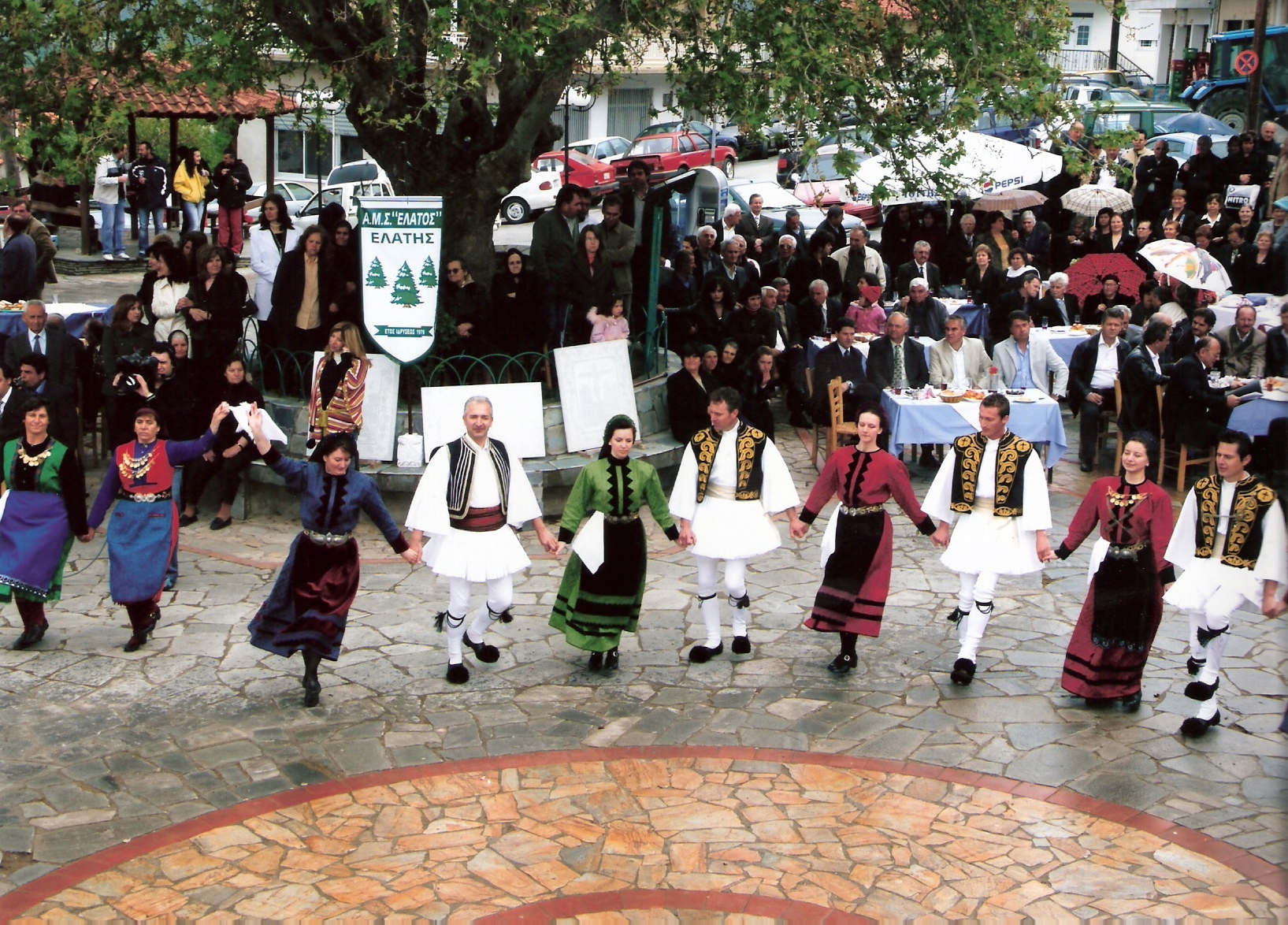
Educational association

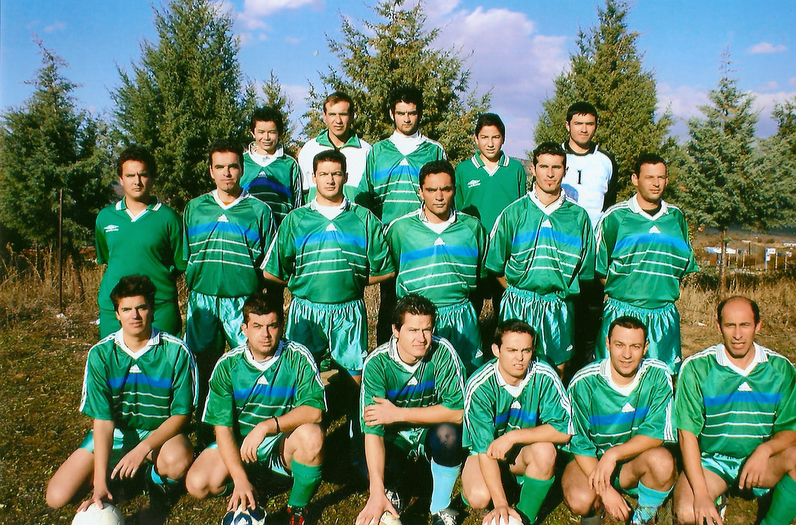
Football club "Elatos"

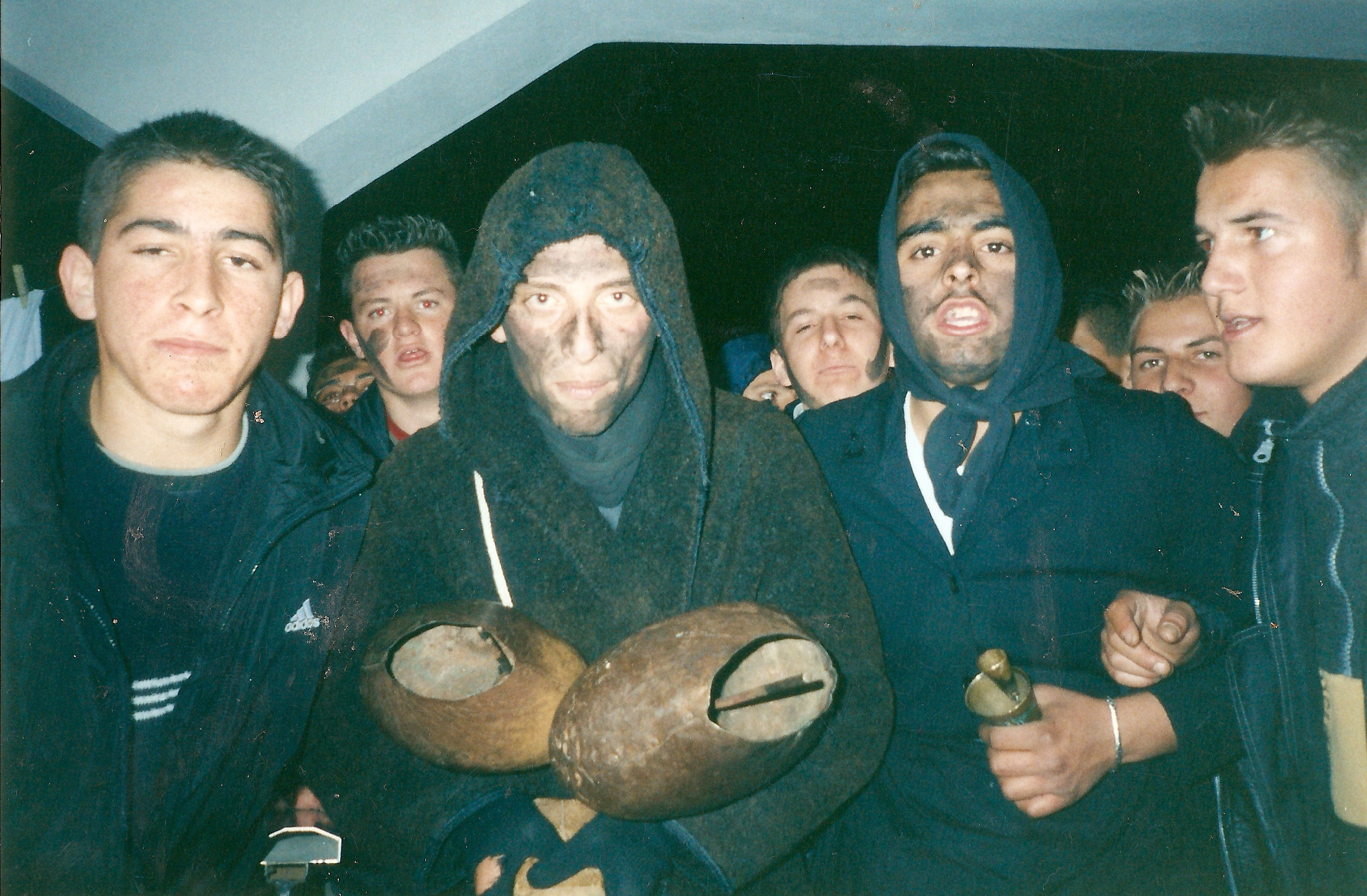
Rogatziarika at New Year

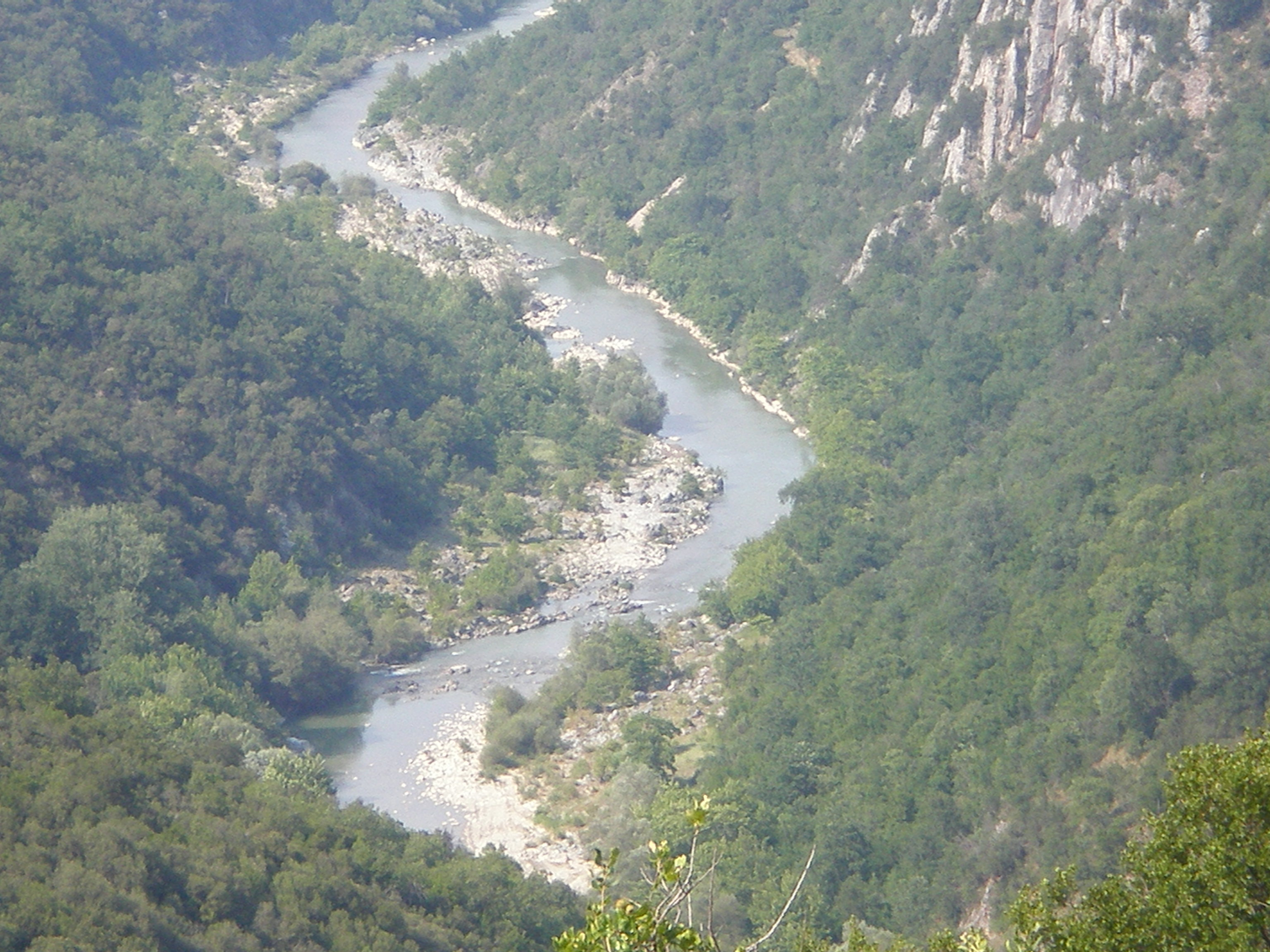
Panoramic view of Aliakmon river

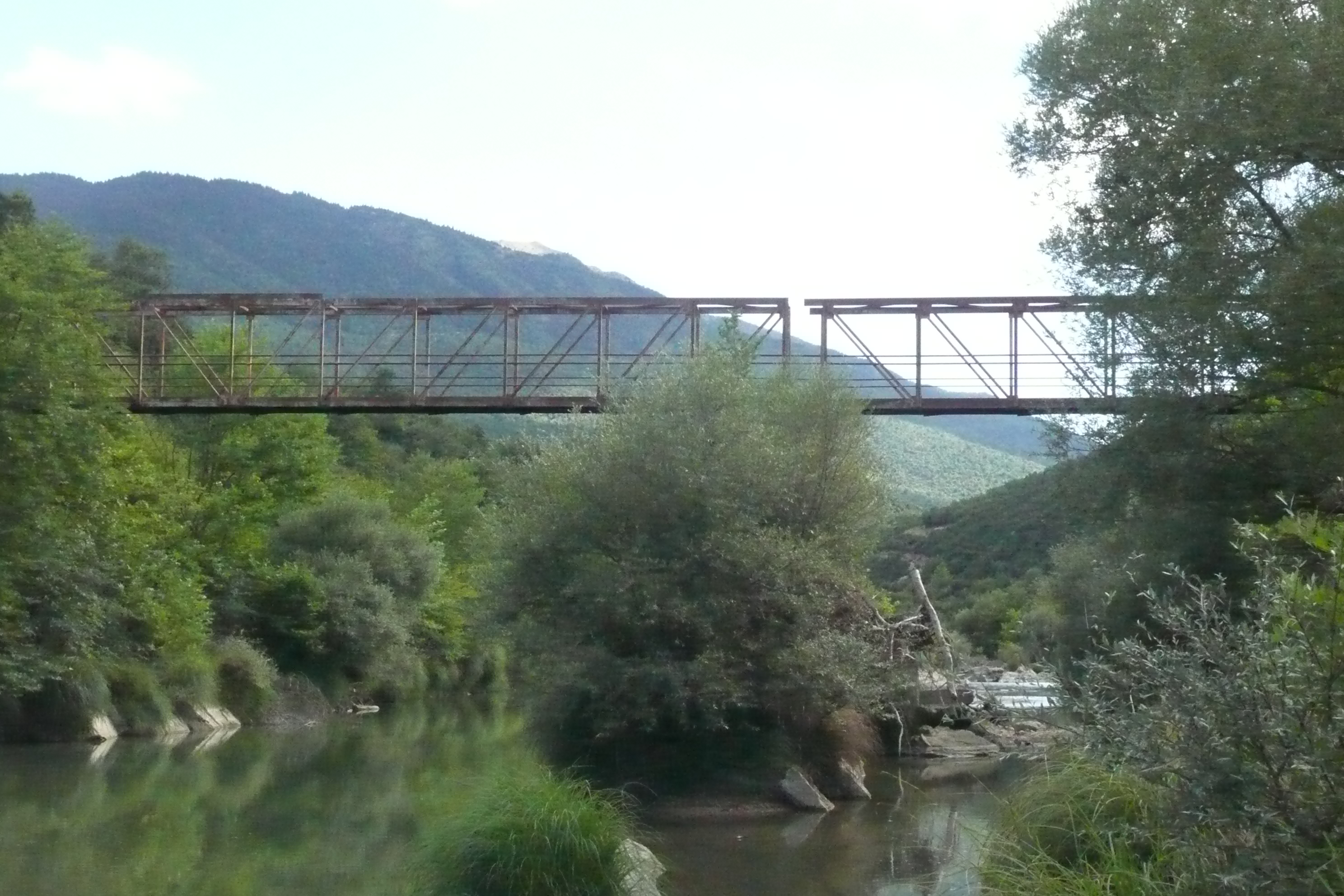
Steel bridge over Aliakmonas river west of Elati 2009

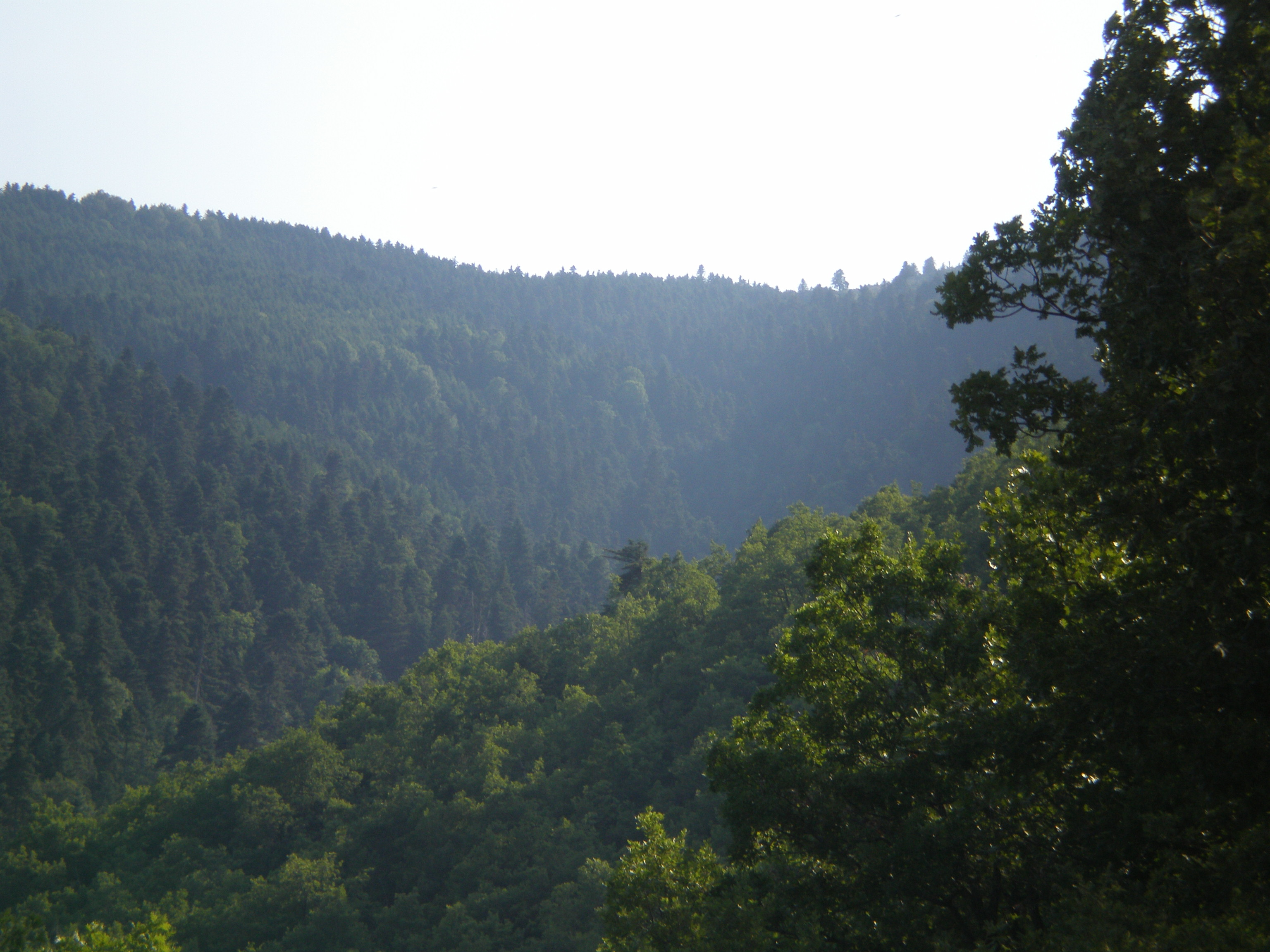
The fir-rich forest

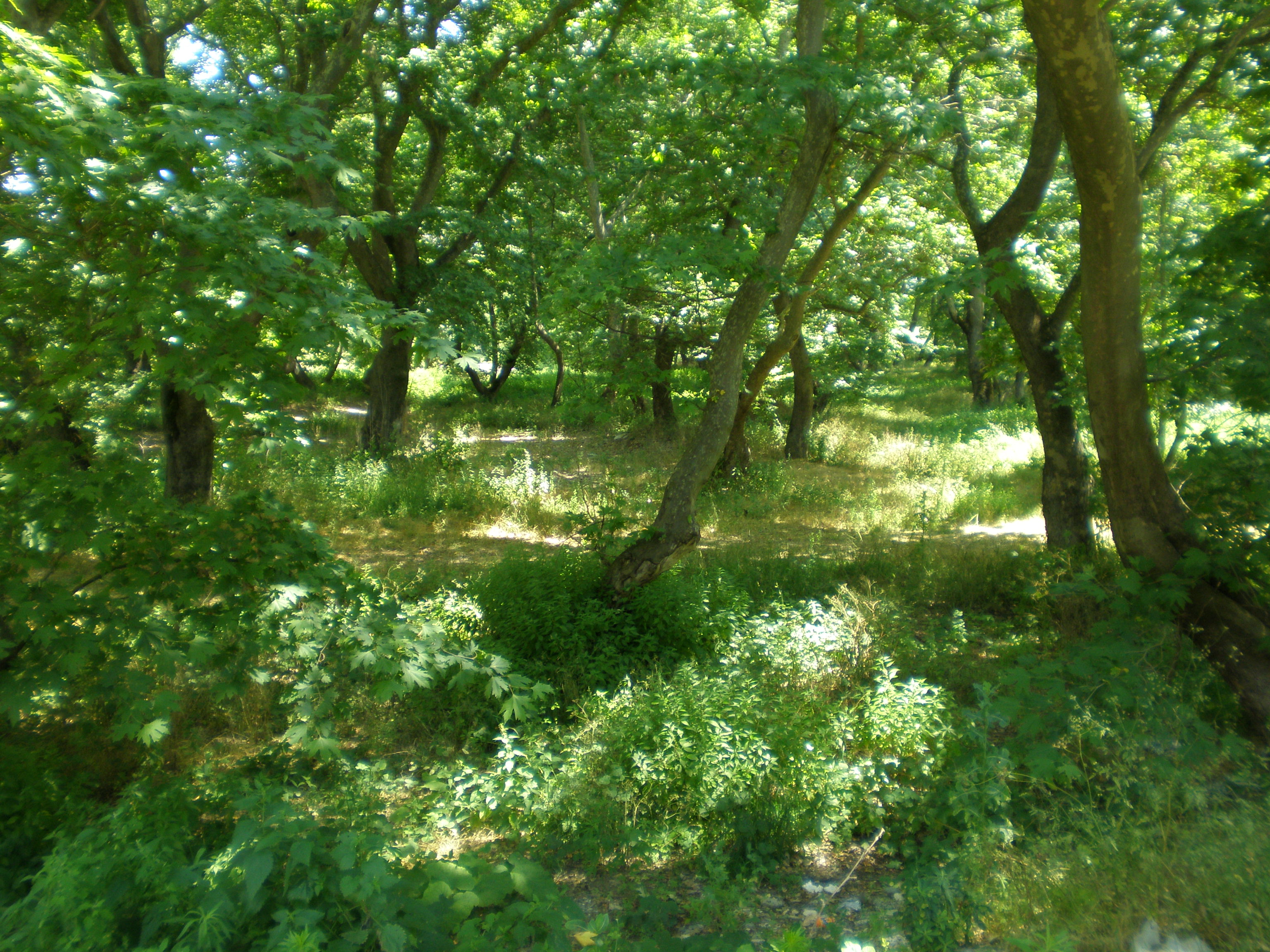
Forest landscape
