= Elatia, Drama =

Elatia Ελατιά
- Settlement
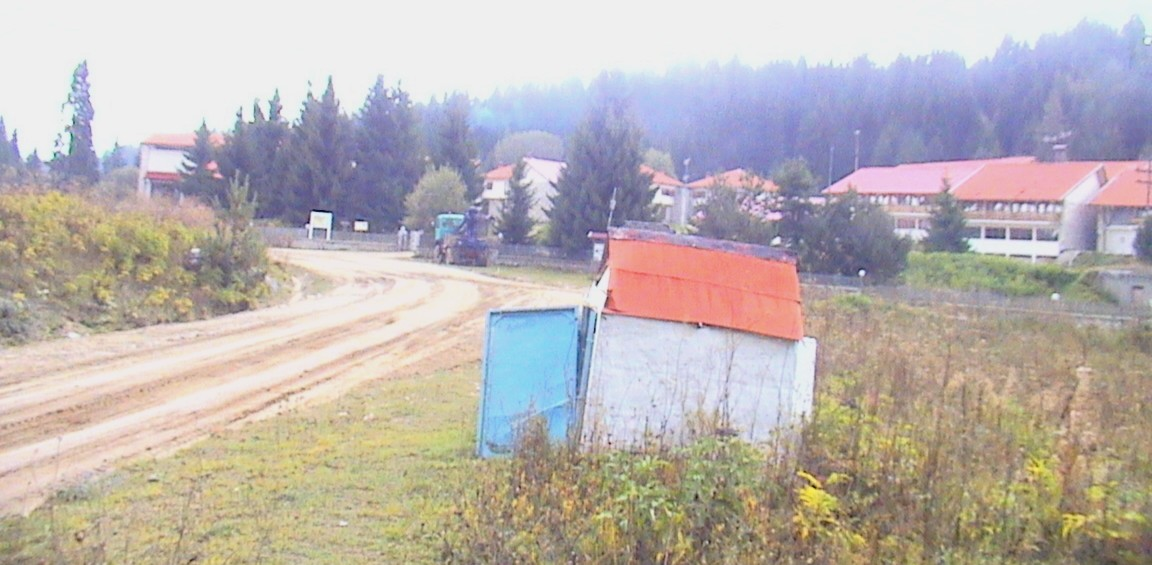
- Entering the forest village of Elatia.

- Location within Greece
- Coordinates: 41°28.84′N 24°19.5′E
- Country: Greece
- Administrative region: East Macedonia and Thrace
- Regional unit: Drama
- Municipality: Drama
- Municipal unit: Sidironero

Population (1920)
  - Total: 153
- Time zone: UTC+2 (EET)
  - Summer (DST): UTC+3 (EEST)
- Postal code: 66035
- Area code: 25240

Elatia (Greek: Ελατιά, Ελατιάς), until 1927 known as Kalyvia Koutra or Kara Dere (Greek: Καλύβια Κούτρα, Καρά Ντερέ, Καράντερέ, Bulgarian: Кара дере), is a forest village in Northern Greece near the border with Bulgaria. It is the administrative center of the Karantere forest. The settlement, which became part of the community of Sidironero in 1927, was dissolved in 1940.

== History ==
After the Russo-Turkish War the village of Elatia (Kalyvia Koutra or Karadere) remained within the borders of the Ottoman Empire and its population consisted of Pomaks and occasionally some Sarakatsani families who used to stay there in summers. It was acceded to Greece after World War I. Its name was changed to Elatia (Ελατιά) in 1927. The village was depopulated in the period 1919–1934, most probably in 1923 as a result of the Treaty of Lausanne. Since then the village remained a place for Sarakatsani in the summers, and nowadays it serves as a center of the forestry enterprise of Elatia mountain and as a tourist station and mountain refuge.
