= Museum of Folklore and History (Drosopigi) =

Museum in Drosopigi, Macedonia, Greece

Coordinates: 40.6894°N 21.455°E

Drosopigi is on Mount Vitsi, 14 kilometres from Florina, Western Macedonia, Greece. In the 1990s members of Drosopigi Cultural Society ‘I Proodos’ started collecting objects from everyday life, some which people still used and some which had fallen into disuse. The folklore collection was created in 1987 and housed in the old community hall of Drosopigi in the centre of the village.

The mission of the museum in charge of this collection is to conserve, record and document objects from folk culture. All the exhibits are from the ruined villages of Drosopigi (located on a different site from the present-day village) and Elateia.

On display are mens’ and womens’ traditional clothing, domestic utensils, tradesmens’ tools (mainly from the building trade), jewellery, church furnishings, icons, old books, a fine collection of photographs depicting scenes from village life in decades gone by and a number of documents that give insight into the history of the village in the 19th and 20th centuries.

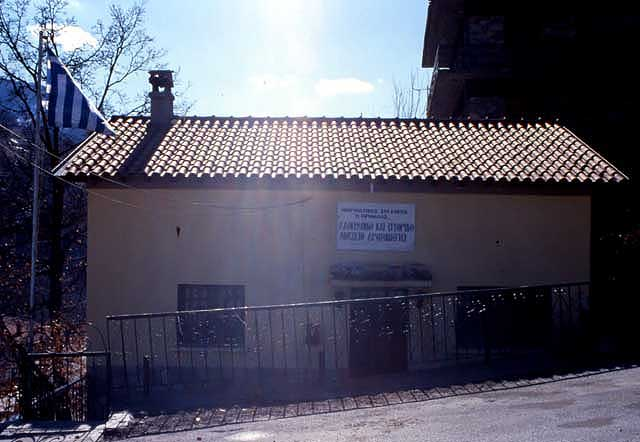
External view
