= Elatia (mountain) =

Mountain in Eastern Macedonia, Greece

Coordinates: 40.85°N 24.10°E

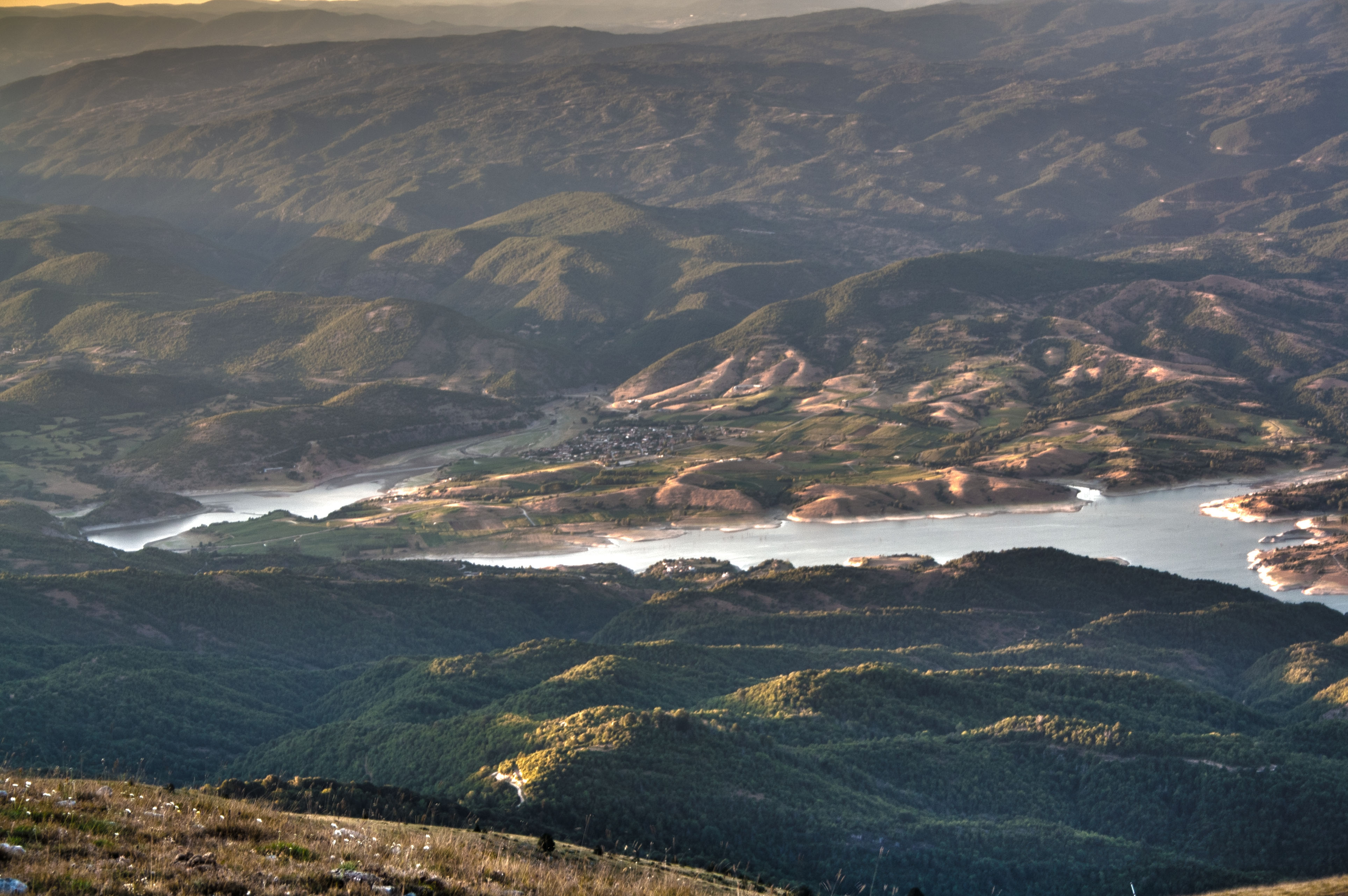
View of Elatia mountain and forest area north of Potami village.

Elatia or Karantere (Greek: Ελατιά or Καρά Ντερέ) is a mostly forested mountain area located in the central and northern parts of the Drama regional unit (and partially Kavala regional unit) in Greek Macedonia that extends along the Greek-Βulgarian border. Karantere is 90% covered by the forest of Elatia and contains the forest village of Elatia. The Forest of Elatia and Karantere are sometimes used interchangeably when describing the area.

The forest village of Elatia lies at the location known as "Koutra," 72 km from Drama, Greece. The forest is owned by the Greek Forest Service, with the village being the administrative and operational center for the Forest of Elatia.

== Flora, fauna, and funga ==
Karantere contains the country's only forest of spruce trees. The landscape of the area is similar to that of central and northern Europe. Among the trees and plant life that can be found within the forest are:

Alder	Hornbeam
Ash	Maple
Beech	Oak
Birch	Poplar
Bourtree	Ostrya
Abies borisii-regis	Wild roses
Cedar	Scots pine
Dogwood	Sorbus
Elderberry	Willow

There is a great wealth of plants in Elatia with more than 700 species. Many of which are endemic the Balkans and many of which are rare in Greece. A wide variety of mushrooms can be seen, many which are edible (Boletus, Amanita caesarea).

The fauna in the area has animal species such as the brown bear, wild boar, roe deer, hare, wolves, wild cat, wood pigeon, eagles, hawks, and woodpeckers, among others.

== See also ==
- Elatia (Drama), Greece
- East Macedonia and Thrace
- Geography of Greece
- Western Thrace
