= History of Macedonia =

The history of Macedonia can refer to various periods of the history of the region of Macedonia in Southeast Europe, with borders that have varied considerably over time.

More specifically:

- For the history of the ancient kingdom, see History of Macedonia (ancient kingdom).
- For the history of the Ancient Roman province, see Macedonia (Roman province).
- For the history of the Byzantine theme, see Macedonia (theme).
- For the history of the modern Greek region of Macedonia, see History of modern Macedonia (Greece).
- For the history of the sovereign state of North Macedonia, see History of North Macedonia.
- For the history of the region of Pirin Macedonia in modern Bulgaria, see Pirin Macedonia.
- For the demographic history of the wider region, see Demographic history of Macedonia

== See also ==
- Ottoman Macedonia (disambiguation)
- Culture of Macedonia (disambiguation)
- Languages of Macedonia (disambiguation)
- Religion in Macedonia (disambiguation)
- Christianity in Macedonia (disambiguation)
- Macedonia (disambiguation)
- Macedonian (disambiguation)
