= Macedonian culture =

The term Macedonian culture may refer to:

- Culture of Ancient Macedonia
  - Culture of Ancient Macedonians
- Culture of Macedonia (Greece)
  - Culture of Macedonians (Greeks)
- Culture of North Macedonia
  - Culture of Macedonians (ethnic group)
- Culture of Pirin Macedonia (Bulgaria)
- Culture of Macedonia (region)

== See also ==
- Culture of Macedonia (disambiguation)
- Macedonian art (disambiguation)
- Religion in Macedonia (disambiguation)
- Christianity in Macedonia (disambiguation)
- Macedonia (disambiguation)
- Macedonian (disambiguation)
