= Macedonian Church =

The term Macedonian Church may refer to:

- in general, any Church in the historical region of Macedonia, including:

- Church in ancient (Roman and Byzantine) province of Macedonia (see: Metropolitanate of Macedonia, centered in Thessaloniki)

- within Eastern Orthodoxy:

- Macedonian Orthodox Church – Ohrid Archbishopric, an Eastern Orthodox denomination, centered in North Macedonia
- Macedonian Genuine Orthodox Church (sr), an Eastern Orthodox denomination, founded in 2010

- within Catholicism:

- Catholic Church in North Macedonia, the Catholic Church in modern North Macedonia
- Macedonian Byzantine Catholic Church, an Eastern Catholic denomination

== See also ==
- Church (disambiguation)
- Macedonian (disambiguation)
- Macedonian Orthodox Church (disambiguation)
