= Culture of Macedonia =

The term Culture of Macedonia may refer to:

- Culture of Macedonia (region)
- Culture of Ancient Macedonia
- Culture of Macedonia (Greece)
- Culture of North Macedonia
- Culture of Pirin Macedonia (Bulgaria)

== See also ==
- Macedonian culture (disambiguation)
- Languages of Macedonia (disambiguation)
- Religion in Macedonia (disambiguation)
- Christianity in Macedonia (disambiguation)
- Macedonia (disambiguation)
- Macedonian (disambiguation)
