= History of Greece =

The history of Greece encompasses the history of the territory of the modern nation-state of Greece as well as that of the Greek people and the areas they inhabited and ruled historically. The scope of Greek habitation and rule has varied throughout the ages and as a result, the history of Greece is similarly elastic in what it includes.

== Timeline ==
Generally, the history of Greece is divided into the following periods:

- Prehistoric Greece:
  - Paleolithic Greece, starting circa 2 million years ago and ending in 13,000 BC. Significant geomorphological and climatic changes occurred in the modern Greek area which were definitive for the development of fauna and flora and the survival of Homo sapiens in the region.
  - Mesolithic Greece, starting in 13,000 BC and ending around 7,000 BC, was a period of long and slow development of primitive human "proto-communities".
  - Neolithic Greece, beginning with the establishment of agricultural societies around 7,000 BC and ending c. 3,200 – c. 3,100 BC, was a vital part of the early history of Greece because it was the base for early Bronze Age civilizations in the area. The first organized communities developed and basic art became more advanced in Neolithic Greece.
  - Bronze Age Greece (c. 3,200 – c. 1,100 BC) began with the transition to a metal-based economy during the Early Helladic period of mainland Greece (c. 3,200 – c. 2,000 BC). Meanwhile, Cycladic culture prospered in the Cyclades (c. 3,200 – c. 1,050 BC) and Minoan civilization around Crete (c. 3,500 – c. 1,100 BC). The Bronze Age ended with the rise and fall of the Mycenaean Greek palace culture (c. 1,750 – c. 1,050 BC), sealed by the Late Bronze Age collapse.
- Ancient Greece usually encompasses Greek antiquity, as well as part of the region's late prehistory (Late Bronze Age). It lasted from c. 1,200 BC – c. AD 600 and can be subdivided into the following periods:
  - Greek Dark Ages (or Iron Age, Homeric Age), 1,100–800 BC
  - Archaic period, 800–490 BC
  - Classical period, 490–323 BC
  - Hellenistic period, 323–146 BC
  - Roman Greece, covering the period of the Roman conquest of Greece from 146 BC – AD 324
- Byzantine Greece covers the period of Greece under the Byzantine Empire, lasting from the establishment of Constantinople as the capital city of Byzantium in AD 324 until the fall of Constantinople in 1453.
- Frankish/Latin Greece (including the Venetian possessions) lasted from the Fourth Crusade in 1204 to 1797, the year of the disestablishment of the Venetian Republic.
- Ottoman Greece covers the period of Ottoman occupation of Greece from 1453 until the Greek Revolution of 1821.
- Modern Greece covers the period from 1821 to the present.

At its cultural and geographical peak, Greek civilization spread from Egypt all the way to the Hindu Kush mountains in Afghanistan. Since then, Greek minorities have continued to inhabit former Greek territories (e.g. Turkey, Albania, Italy, Libya, Levant, Armenia, Georgia), and Greek emigrants have assimilated into differing societies across the globe (e.g., North America, Australia, Northern Europe, South Africa). At present, most Greeks live in the modern states of Greece (independent since 1821) and Cyprus.

== Prehistoric Greece ==
=== Pre-Paleolithic Period ===
Fossils of one of the earliest pre-humans (Ouranopithecus macedoniensis, 10.6–8.7 million years ago), and of quite possibly the oldest direct ancestor of all humans (Graecopithecus, 7.2 million years ago) were found in Greece. In addition, 5.7 million year old footprints were found on the Greek island of Crete, which may suggest hominin evolution outside of Africa, contrary to current hypotheses.

=== Paleolithic Period (c. 2M – 13000 BC) ===
The Paleolithic period is generally understudied in Greece because research has traditionally focused on the later parts of prehistory (Neolithic, Bronze Age) and the Classical times. Nevertheless, significant advances have been achieved over recent years, and the archaeological record has been enriched with new material, collected mostly in the framework of regional surveys but also through systematic or rescue excavations. New caves and rock shelters, as well as recently discovered and important open-air sites are now being excavated. Scholars believe Greece was first occupied between 2.5 and 1.5 million years ago when early members of the genus Homo began to spread across Eurasia. However, no definitive evidence of habitation this primitive has been discovered yet. The earliest undisputed traces of hominin habitation in the country so far were unearthed in Arcadia, Peloponnesus and date back 700,000 years. The Apidima Cave in Mani, southern Greece, contains the oldest known remains of anatomically modern humans outside of Africa, dated to 210,000 years ago. Currently known anthropological and archaeological finds allow the division of the Paleolithic in the Greek area into Lower (700,000–100,000 BP), Middle (100,000–35,000 BP) and Upper Palaeolithic (35,000–11,000 BP). There are, to date, few sites of the Lower Paleolithic, whereas there are more of the Middle and Upper. This is partly due to the intense tectonic activity in the Greek area and the rise and fall of the Aegean Sea which destroyed every trace of habitation from some geographical regions.

Paleolithic finds from Greece were first reported in 1867, but the first organized research on the sites was conducted many years later, between 1927 and 1931, by the Austrian archaeologist Adalbert Markovits. The first excavation of a Paleolithic site took place in 1942 at Seidi Cave in Boeotia by the German archaeologist Rudolf Stampfuss. More systematic research, however, was conducted during the 1960s in Epirus, Macedonia, Thessaly and the Peloponnese by English, American and German research groups.

=== Mesolithic Period (13000–7000 BC) ===
The Mesolithic in Greece occurred between the Upper Paleolithic and the Neolithic. Mesolithic sites in Greece were limited, and the majority are located near the coast. Franchthi Cave, the Kalamakia Cave in Mani (Peloponnese), the Asprochaliko Cave in Epirus (where the first excavation took place in 1960) and the Theopetra Cave are among the most important Mesolithic sites in Greece and Southeast Europe, and were inhabited almost continuously throughout the Paleolithic and the Mesolithic Period.

=== Neolithic Period to Bronze Age (7000–1100 BC) ===
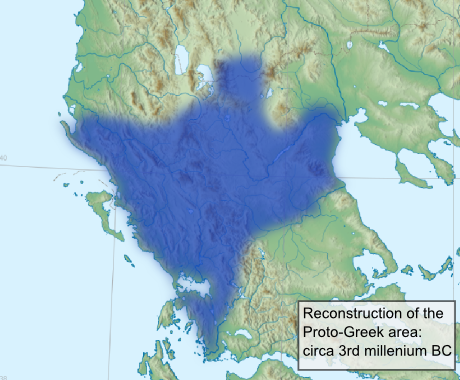
Proto-Greek linguistic area according to linguist Vladimir I. Georgiev.

The Neolithic Revolution reached Europe beginning in 7000–6500 BC when agriculturalists from the Near East entered the Greek peninsula from Anatolia by island-hopping through the Aegean Sea. The earliest known Neolithic sites with developed agricultural economies in Europe, dated 8500–9000 BP, were found in Greece. The first Greek-speaking tribes, speaking the predecessor of the Mycenaean language, arrived in the Greek mainland sometime in the Neolithic period or the Early Bronze Age (c. 3200 BC).

==== Cycladic and Minoan civilization ====
The Cycladic culture is a significant Late Neolithic and Early Bronze Age material culture from the Cyclades, best known for its schematic flat female idols carved out of the islands' pure white marble.

The Middle Bronze Age Minoan civilization in Crete lasted from c. 3000 – c. 1400 BC. Little specific information is known about the Minoans, including their written system, which was recorded with the undeciphered Linear A script and Cretan hieroglyphs. Even the name Minoans is a modern appellation, derived from Minos, the legendary king of Crete. They were primarily a mercantile people engaged in extensive overseas trade throughout the Mediterranean region.

Minoan civilization was affected by a number of natural cataclysms, such as the volcanic eruption at Thera (c. 1628-1627 BC) and earthquakes (c. 1600 BC). In 1425 BC, all the Minoan palaces except Knossos were devastated by fire, which allowed the Mycenaean Greeks, influenced by the Minoans' culture, to expand into Crete. Remains of the Minoan civilization which preceded the Mycenaean civilization on Crete were first discovered in the modern era by Sir Arthur Evans in 1900, when he purchased and began excavating the site at Knossos.

Pre-Mycenean Helladic period

Following the end of the Neolithic, the last Stone Age period, the Early and Middle Helladic periods were established on the Greek mainland. The slow transition from the Final Neolithic period took place with the Eutresis culture (c. 3200 – c. 2650 BC). Over hundreds of years, agricultural communities transitioned from stone tools to metal ones. Following such materialistic developments, more powerful micro-states and the base of the future Mycenean civilization were developed. Early Bronze Age settlements saw further development during Helladic III, exemplified by the Tiryns culture (c. 2200 – c. 2000 BC), and the Middle Helladic period before the Mycenean period discussed below.

==== Mycenaean civilization ====
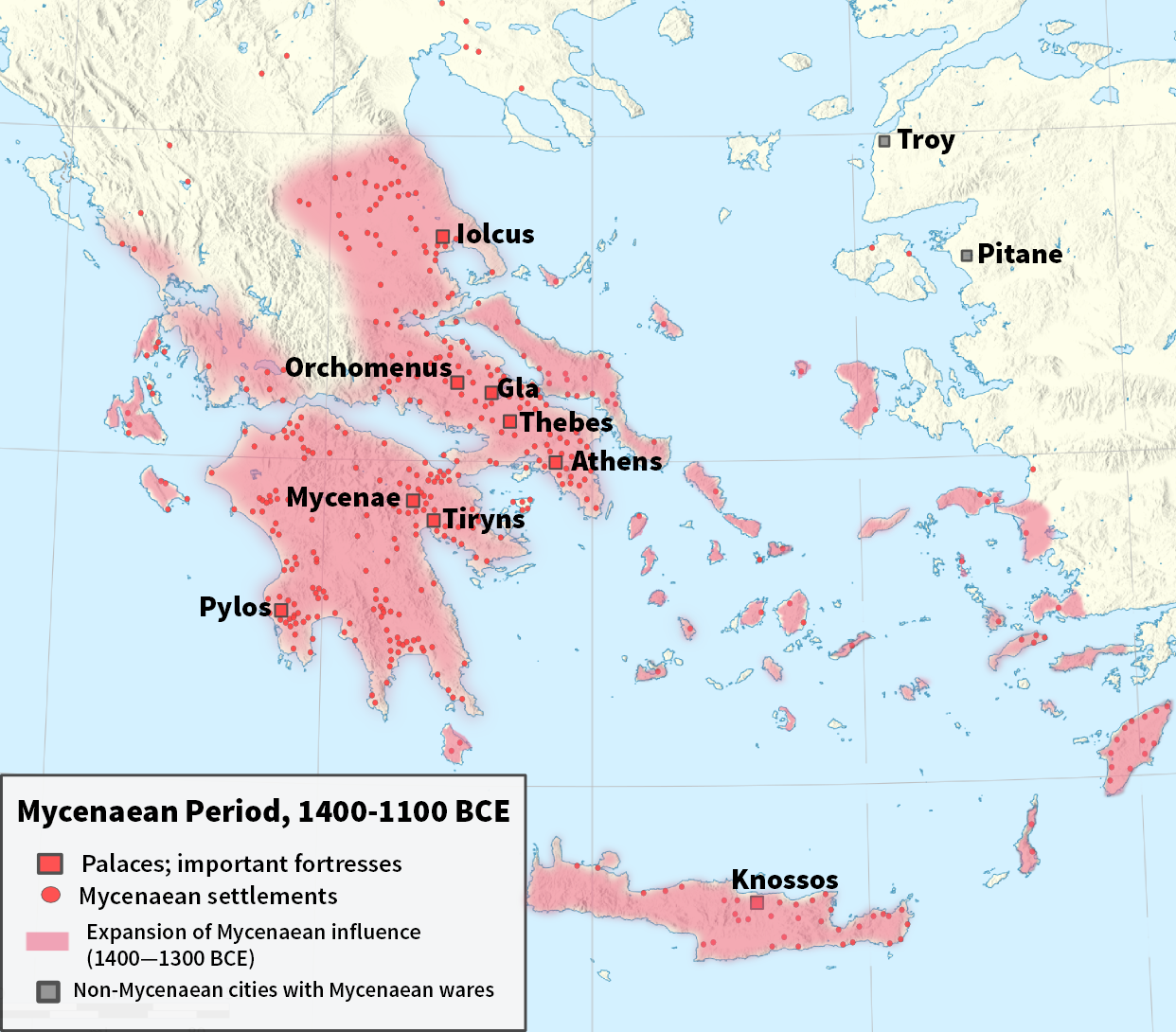
Mycenaean Greece, c. 1400–1100 BC.

Mycenaean civilization originated and evolved from the society and culture of the Early and Middle Helladic periods in mainland Greece. It emerged c. 1600 BC, when Helladic culture was transformed under influences from Minoan Crete, and it lasted until the collapse of the Mycenaean palaces c. 1100 BC. Mycenaean Greece is the Late Helladic Bronze Age civilization of Ancient Greece, and it formed the historical setting of the epics of Homer and most of Greek mythology and religion. The Mycenaean period takes its name from the archaeological site Mycenae in the northeastern Argolid, in the Peloponnesos of southern Greece. Athens, Pylos, Thebes, and Tiryns also have important Mycenaean sites.

Mycenaean civilization was dominated by a warrior aristocracy. Around 1400 BC, the Mycenaeans extended their control to Crete, the center of the Minoan civilization, and adopted a form of the Minoan script Linear A to write an early form of Greek. The Mycenaean-era script is called Linear B, which was deciphered in 1952 by Michael Ventris. The Mycenaeans buried their nobles in beehive tombs (tholoi), large circular burial chambers with a high-vaulted roof and straight entry passage lined with stone. They often buried daggers or some other form of military equipment with the deceased. Nobility was also often buried with gold masks, tiaras, armor, and jeweled weapons. Mycenaeans were buried in a sitting position, and some of the nobility underwent mummification.

Around 1100–1050 BC, the Mycenaean civilization collapsed. Numerous cities were sacked, and the region entered what historians see as a "dark age". During this period, Greece experienced a decline in population and literacy. The Greeks themselves have traditionally blamed this decline on an invasion by another wave of Greek people, the Dorians, although there is scant archaeological evidence for this view.

== Ancient Greece (1100–146 BC) ==
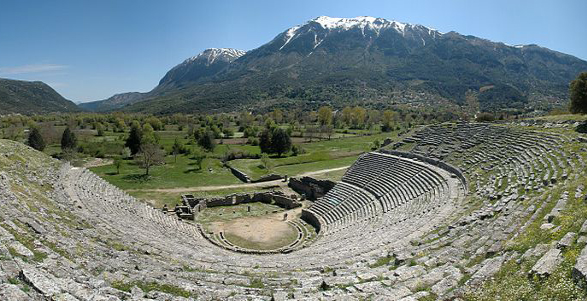
The ancient theatre of Dodona

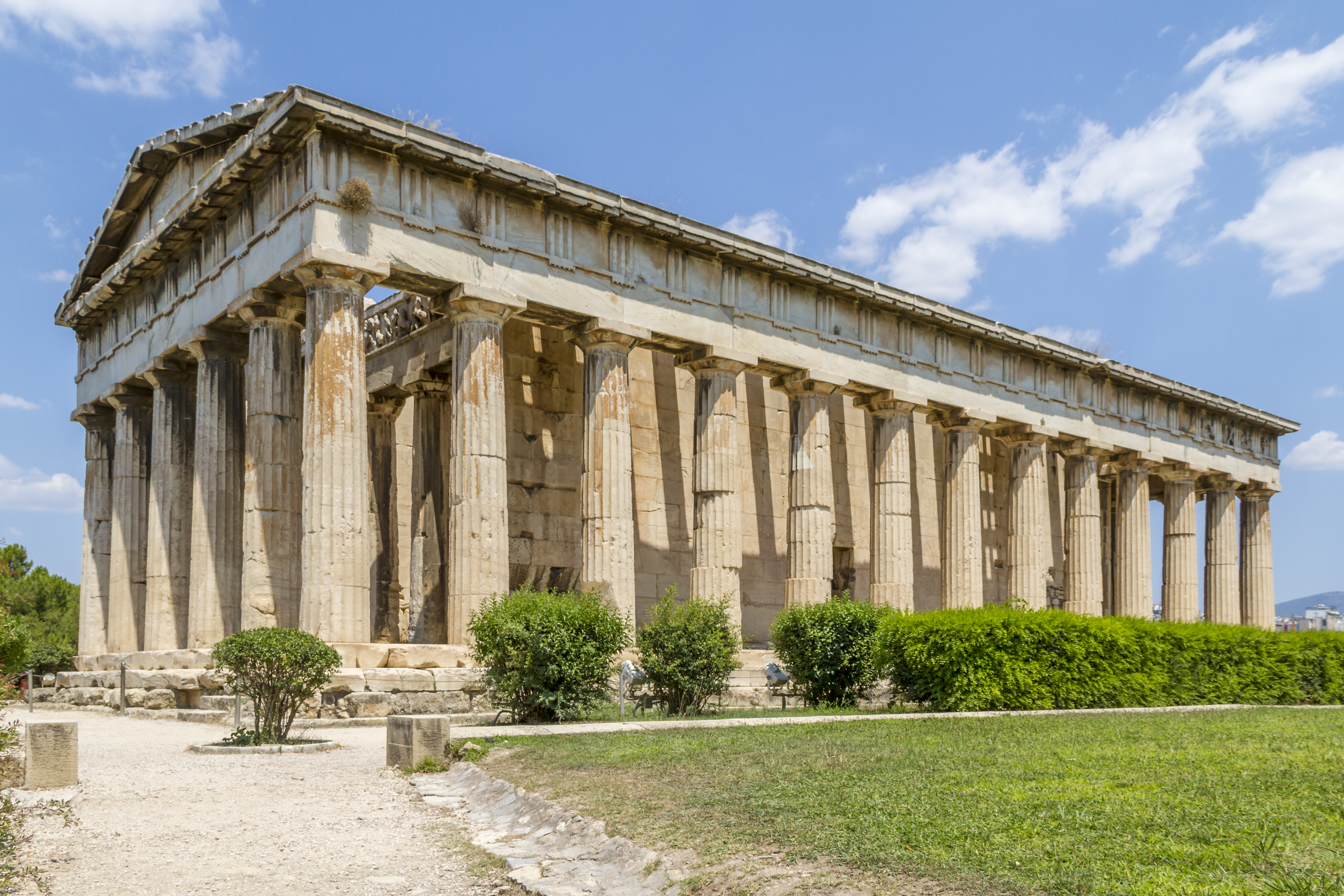
The Temple of Hephaestus in Athens

Ancient Greece refers to a period of Greek history that lasted from the Greek Dark Ages (c. 1050 – c. 750 BC) to the end of antiquity (c. AD 600). In common usage, it can refer to all Greek history before—or including—the Roman Empire, but historians tend to use the term more precisely. Some include the periods of the Minoan and Mycenaean civilizations, while others argue that these civilizations were so different from later Greek cultures that they should be classed separately. Traditionally, the Ancient Greek period was taken to begin with the date of the first Olympic Games in 776 BC, but most historians now extend the term back to about 1000 BC, toward the beginning of the Greek Dark Ages.

The Greek Dark Ages are succeeded by the Archaic period, which began c. 800 BC and lasted until the second Persian invasion of Greece in 480 BC. It was during this period that the Greek alphabet and early Greek literature developed, as well as the poleis ("city-states") of Ancient Greece. With the end of the Dark Ages, Greeks spread to the shores of the Black Sea, Southern Italy (the so-called "Magna Graecia") and Asia Minor. The Classical period began during the Greco-Persian wars in the 5th century BC and was marked by increased autonomy from the Persian Empire, as well as the flourishing of Ancient Greek democracy, art, theater, literature, and philosophy. The traditional date for the end of the Classical Greek period is the death of Alexander the Great in 323 BC, and the period that follows is termed the Hellenistic, ending with the rise of the Roman Empire at the end of the first millennium BC. Not everyone treats the Classical Greek and Hellenic periods as distinct—some writers treat the Ancient Greek civilization as a continuum running until the proliferation of Christianity in the 3rd century.

Ancient Greece is considered by many historians to be the foundational culture of Western civilization. Greek culture was a powerful influence in the Roman Empire, which carried a version of it to many parts of Europe. Ancient Greek civilization has been immensely influential on the language, politics, educational systems, philosophy, art, and architecture of the modern world, particularly during the Renaissance in Western Europe and again during various neo-classical revivals in 18th- and 19th-century Europe and the Americas.

=== Iron Age (1100–800 BC) ===
The Greek Dark Ages (c. 1100 – c. 800 BC) refers to the period of Greek history from the presumed Dorian invasion and end of the Mycenaean civilization in the 11th century BC to the rise of the first Greek city-states in the 9th century BC and the epics of Homer and earliest writings in the Greek alphabet in the 8th century BC.

The collapse of the Mycenaean civilization coincided with the fall of several other large empires in the near east, most notably the Hittite and the Egyptian. The cause is still somewhat mysterious, but has often been attributed to the invasion of hypothesized Sea Peoples wielding iron weapons. A hypothesized Dorian invasion may have also contributed, as asserted by ancient Greek legend but unsubstantiated by the archaeological record. Legend asserts that Dorians migrated down into Greece equipped with superior iron weapons, colonizing and easily dispersing the already weakened Mycenaeans. The period that follows these events is collectively known as the Greek Dark Ages.

Kings ruled throughout this period until eventually they were replaced with an aristocracy, then still later, in some areas, an aristocracy within an aristocracy—an elite of the elite. Warfare shifted from a focus on the cavalry to a great emphasis on infantry. Due to its cheapness of production and local availability, iron replaced bronze as the metal of choice in the manufacturing of tools and weapons. Slowly, however, equality grew among the different sects of people, leading to the dethronement of the various kings and the rise of the family.

At the end of this period of stagnation, the Greek civilization was engulfed in a renaissance that spread throughout the Greek world as far as the Black Sea and Spain. Writing was relearned from the Phoenicians, eventually spreading north into Italy and the Gauls.

=== Archaic Greece ===
In the 8th century BC, Greece began to emerge from the Dark Ages which followed the fall of the Mycenaean civilization. Literacy had been lost and Mycenaean script forgotten, but the Greeks adopted the Phoenician alphabet, modifying it to create the Greek alphabet. From about the 9th century BC, written records begin to appear. Greece was divided into many small self-governing communities, a pattern largely dictated by Greek geography, where every island, valley, and plain is cut off from its neighbors by the sea or mountain ranges.

The Archaic period can be understood as the Orientalizing period, when Greece was at the fringe, but not under the sway, of the budding Neo-Assyrian Empire. Greece adopted significant amounts of cultural elements from the Orient, in art as well as in religion and mythology. Archaeologically, Archaic Greece is marked by Geometric pottery.

=== Classical Greece ===
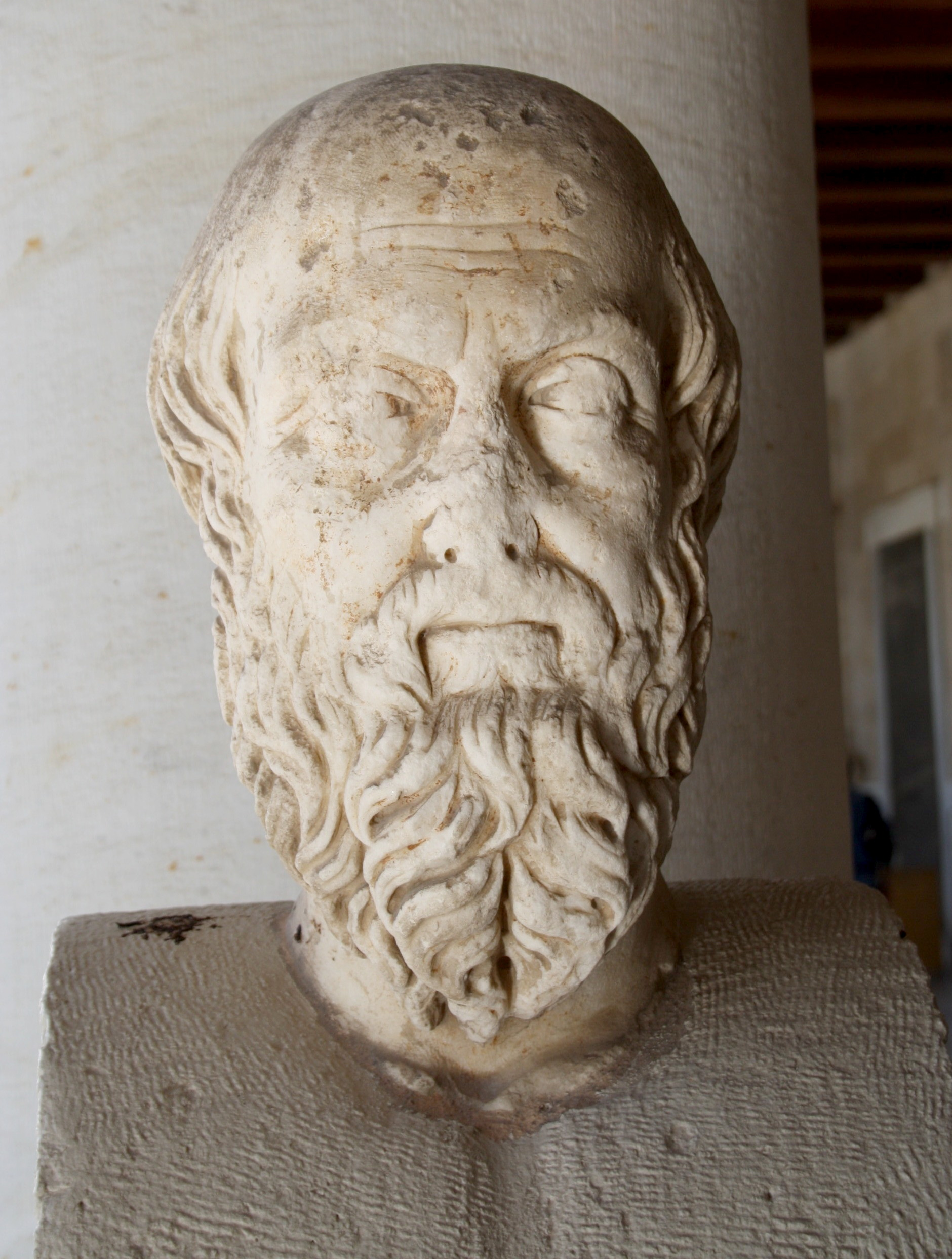
Bust of Herodotus in Stoa of Attalus, one of the earliest nameable historians whose work survives.

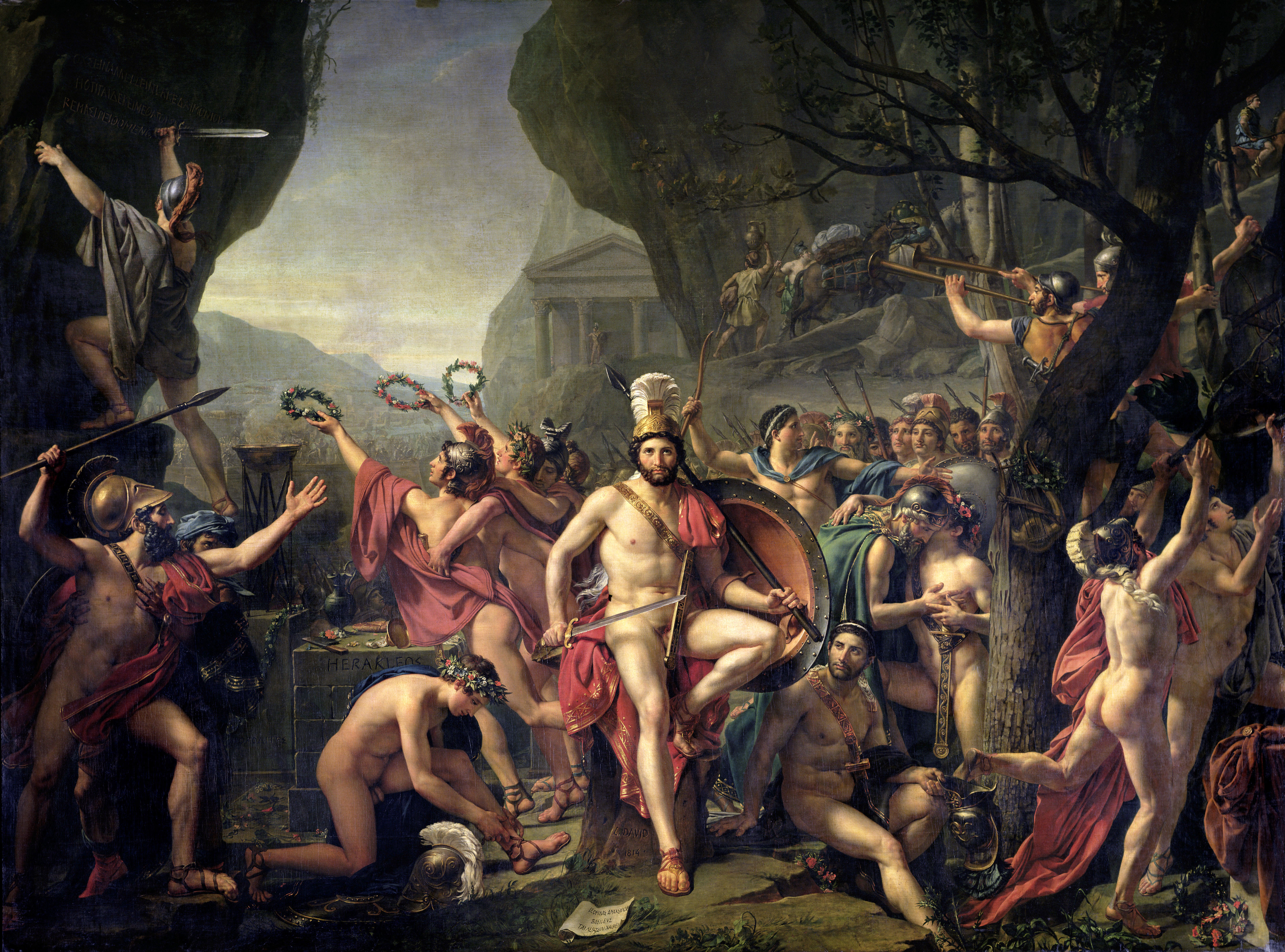
Leonidas at Thermopylae by Jacques-Louis David.

The basic unit of politics in Ancient Greece was the polis (Ancient Greek: πόλις), sometimes translated as "city-state". The term lends itself to the modern English word "politics", which literally means "the things of the polis". At least in theory, each polis was politically independent. However, some poleis were subordinate to others (e.g., a colony traditionally deferred to its mother city), and some had governments wholly dependent upon others (e.g., the Thirty Tyrants in Athens was imposed by Sparta following the Peloponnesian War), but the titularly supreme power in each polis was located within that city. This meant that when Greece went to war (e.g., against the Persian Empire), it took the form of an alliance going to war. It also gave ample opportunity for wars within Greece between different poleis.

==== Persian Wars ====
Two major wars shaped the Classical Greek world. The first was the Persian Wars (499–449 BC), recounted in the Greek historian Herodotus's Histories. By the late 6th century BC, the Achaemenid Persian Empire ruled over all Greek city-states in Ionia (the western coast of modern-day Turkey) and had made territorial gains in the Balkans and Eastern Europe proper as well. In 499 BC, the Greek cities of Ionia, led by Miletus, revolted against the Persian Empire and were supported by some mainland cities, including Athens and Eretria. After the uprising had been quelled, Darius I launched the first Persian invasion of Greece to exact revenge on the mainland Greeks. In 492 BC, Persian general Mardonius led an army (supported by a fleet) across the Hellespont, re-subjugating Thrace and adding Macedonia as a fully-subjugated client kingdom. However, before he could reach Greece proper, his fleet was destroyed in a storm near Mount Athos. In 490 BC, Darius sent another fleet directly across the Aegean Sea (rather than following the land route as Mardonius had done) to subdue Athens. After destroying the city of Eretria, the fleet landed and faced the Athenian army at Marathon, which ended in a decisive Athenian victory.

In 480 BC, Xerxes I, successor to Darius I, launched the Second Persian invasion of Greece. The Persians scored early victories, most notably at Thermopylae, where a small Greek force led by King Leonidas I of Sparta held the pass for three days before being outflanked and overwhelmed. Persian forces overran northern and central Greece, capturing and burning the evacuated city of Athens. However, the Greek city-states soon turned the tide with a bold naval victory at Salamis later that year. The Athenian general Themistocles lured the larger Persian fleet into the narrow straits, where its size proved a disadvantage. Xerxes withdrew, leaving his general Mardonius to continue the campaign; in 479 BC, Greek land forces decisively defeated the Persians at Plataea.

==== Athenian hegemony ====
To prosecute the war and then to defend Greece from further Persian attacks, Athens founded the Delian League in 477 BC. Initially, each city in the League would contribute ships and soldiers to a common army, but in time Athens allowed (and then compelled) the smaller cities to contribute funds so that it could supply their quota of ships. Secession from the League could be punished. Following military reversals against the Persians, the treasury was moved from Delos to Athens, further strengthening the latter's control over the League. The Delian League was eventually referred to pejoratively as the Athenian Empire.

In 458 BC, while the Persian Wars were still ongoing, war broke out between the Delian League and the Peloponnesian League, comprising Sparta and its allies. After some inconclusive fighting, the two sides signed a peace treaty in 447 BC. That peace was stipulated to last thirty years: instead, it held only until 431 BC, with the onset of the Peloponnesian War.

==== Peloponnesian War ====
The main sources concerning the Peloponnesian war (431–404 BC) are Thucydides's History of the Peloponnesian War and Xenophon's Hellenica. Both historians were also Athenian generals who lived through the war.

The war began in 431 BC over a dispute between the cities of Corcyra and Epidamnus. Corinth, an ally of Sparta in the Peloponnesian League, intervened on the Epidamnian side. Fearful that Corinth would capture the Corcyran navy (second only to the Athenian in size), Athens intervened. They prevented Corinth from landing on Corcyra at the Battle of Sybota, laid siege to Potidaea, and forbade all commerce with Corinth's closely situated ally, Megara, with the Megarian decree.

There was disagreement among the Greeks as to which party violated the treaty between the Delian and Peloponnesian Leagues, as Athens was technically defending a new ally. The Corinthians turned to Sparta for aid. Fearing the growing might of Athens and witnessing Athens' willingness to use it against the Megarians (the embargo would have ruined them), Sparta declared the treaty violated, and the Peloponnesian War began in earnest.

The first stage of the war (known as the Archidamian War for the Spartan king Archidamus II) lasted until 421 BC with the signing of the Peace of Nicias. It began with the Athenian general Pericles recommending that his city fight a defensive war, avoiding battle against the superior land forces led by Sparta, and importing everything needful by maintaining its powerful navy. Athens would simply outlast Sparta, whose citizens feared leave their city for long lest the helots, a subjugated population of Sparta, revolt.

This strategy required that Athens endure regular sieges, and in 430 BC it was visited with an devastating plague that killed about a quarter of its people,including Pericles. With Pericles gone, less conservative elements gained power in the city and Athens went on the offensive. In 425 BC, it captured 300–400 Spartan hoplites (soldiers) at the Battle of Pylos, a significant fraction of the Spartan fighting force which it could not afford to lose. Meanwhile, Athens suffered humiliating defeats at Delium in 424 BC and Amphipolis in 422. The Peace of Nicias in 421 concluded the first stage of the war, with Sparta recovering its hoplites and Athens recovering the city of Amphipolis.

Map of the Delian League ("Athenian Empire or Alliance") in 431 BC, just prior to the Peloponnesian War.

Those who signed the Peace of Nicias in 421 BC swore to uphold it for fifty years, but peace lasted only seven years. The second stage of the Peloponnesian War began in 415 BC when Athens embarked on the Sicilian Expedition in Magna Graecia to support its ally Segesta in Sicily against an attack by Syracuse (a Spartan ally also in Sicily) and conquer the island. Initially, Sparta was reluctant to help Syracuse, but Alcibiades, the Athenian general who had argued for the Sicilian Expedition, defected to the Spartan cause after being accused of grossly impious acts. Alcibiades convinced the Spartans that they could not allow Athens to subjugate Syracuse. The campaign ended in disaster for the Athenians.

After the Athenian defeat in Sicily, Athens' Ionian possessions rebelled with the support of Sparta, as advised by Alcibiades. In 411 BC, an oligarchical revolt in Athens held out the chance for peace, but the Athenian navy, which remained committed to the democracy, refused to accept the change and continued fighting in Athens' name. The navy recalled Alcibiades, who had been forced to abandon the Spartan cause after reputedly seducing the wife of Agis II, a Spartan king, and made him its head. The oligarchy in Athens collapsed and Alcibiades reconquered what had been lost for Athens.

In 407 BC, Alcibiades was replaced following a minor naval defeat at the Battle of Notium. The Spartan general Lysander, having fortified his city's naval power, began winning victory after victory. Athens won the Battle of Arginusae in 406 BC but was prevented by bad weather from rescuing many of its sailors, leading the city to execute or exile eight of its top naval commanders. Lysander followed with a crushing blow at the Battle of Aegospotami in 405 BC which almost destroyed the Athenian fleet.

==== Spartan hegemony ====
Athens surrendered one year later, ending the Peloponnesian War and beginning a brief period of Spartan hegemony in Greece. The war left devastation in its wake. Discontent with Spartan hegemony from both Athenian and former Spartan allies led to the Corinthian War of 395–387 BC. Backed by the Achaemenid Persian Empire, Athens, Thebes, Corinth, and Argos significantly weakened Spartan military power, though unsuccessful in ending Spartan dominance. The war concluded with the Treaty of Antalcidas in 387 BC, in which Sparta was forced to cede Ionia and Cyprus to the Persian Empire.

==== Theban hegemony ====
The Corinthian War and its aftermath further sowed the seeds of discontent in Spartan Greece, inducing the Thebans to attack once more. Their general, Epaminondas, crushed Sparta at the Battle of Leuctra in 371 BC, inaugurating a period of Theban dominance in Greece.

==== Philip II of Macedon ====
In 346 BC, unable to prevail in its ten-year war with Phocis, Thebes called upon Philip II of Macedon for aid. Macedon quickly unified the Greek city-states under Macedonian hegemony into the League of Corinth in 338–337 BC.

==== Alexander the Great ====
In 336 BC, power was transferred to Philip's heir Alexander the Great, who spent the next ten years conquering the Persian Empire and much of Western Asia and Egypt. By the age of 30, Alexander had created one of the largest empires in history, stretching from Greece to northwestern India. He was undefeated in battle and is widely considered to be one of history's greatest and most successful military commanders. After Alexander's death in 323 BC, the Macedonian Empire disintegrated under widespread civil wars, beginning the Hellenistic Age of Greek history.

=== Hellenistic Greece ===
The Hellenistic period of Greek history begins with the death of Alexander the Great in 323 BC and ends with the conquest of the Greek peninsula and islands by Rome in 146 BC. Although the establishment of Roman rule did not break the continuity of Hellenistic society and culture, which remained essentially unchanged until the advent of Christianity, it did mark the end of Greek political independence.

During the Hellenistic period, the importance of "Greece proper" (that is, the territory of modern Greece) within the Greek-speaking world declined sharply. The great centres of Hellenistic culture were Alexandria and Antioch, capitals of Ptolemaic Egypt and Seleucid Syria, respectively. (See Hellenistic civilization for the history of Greek culture outside Greece in this period.)

Athens and her allies revolted against Macedon upon hearing that Alexander the Great had died in 323 BC, but were defeated within a year in the Lamian War. Meanwhile, a struggle for power broke out among Alexander's generals, which resulted in the break-up of his empire and the establishment of a number of new kingdoms in the Wars of the Diadochi. Ptolemy was left with Egypt, and Seleucus with the Levant, Mesopotamia, and points east. Control of Greece, Thrace, and Anatolia was contested, but by 298 BC the Antigonid dynasty had supplanted the Antipatrid. Pyrrhus of Epirus became king of Epirus in 297 BC with the support of Ptolemy I Soter. He co-ruled Macedon together with Lysimachus after driving out Demetrius in 288 BC. During the eponymous Pyrrhic War of 280–275 BC, Pyrrhus fought Rome at the behest of Tarentum, scoring costly victories at Heraclea and Asculum. Pyrrhus seized the Macedonian throne from Antigonus II Gonatas in 274 BC but was killed during a street battle at Argos.

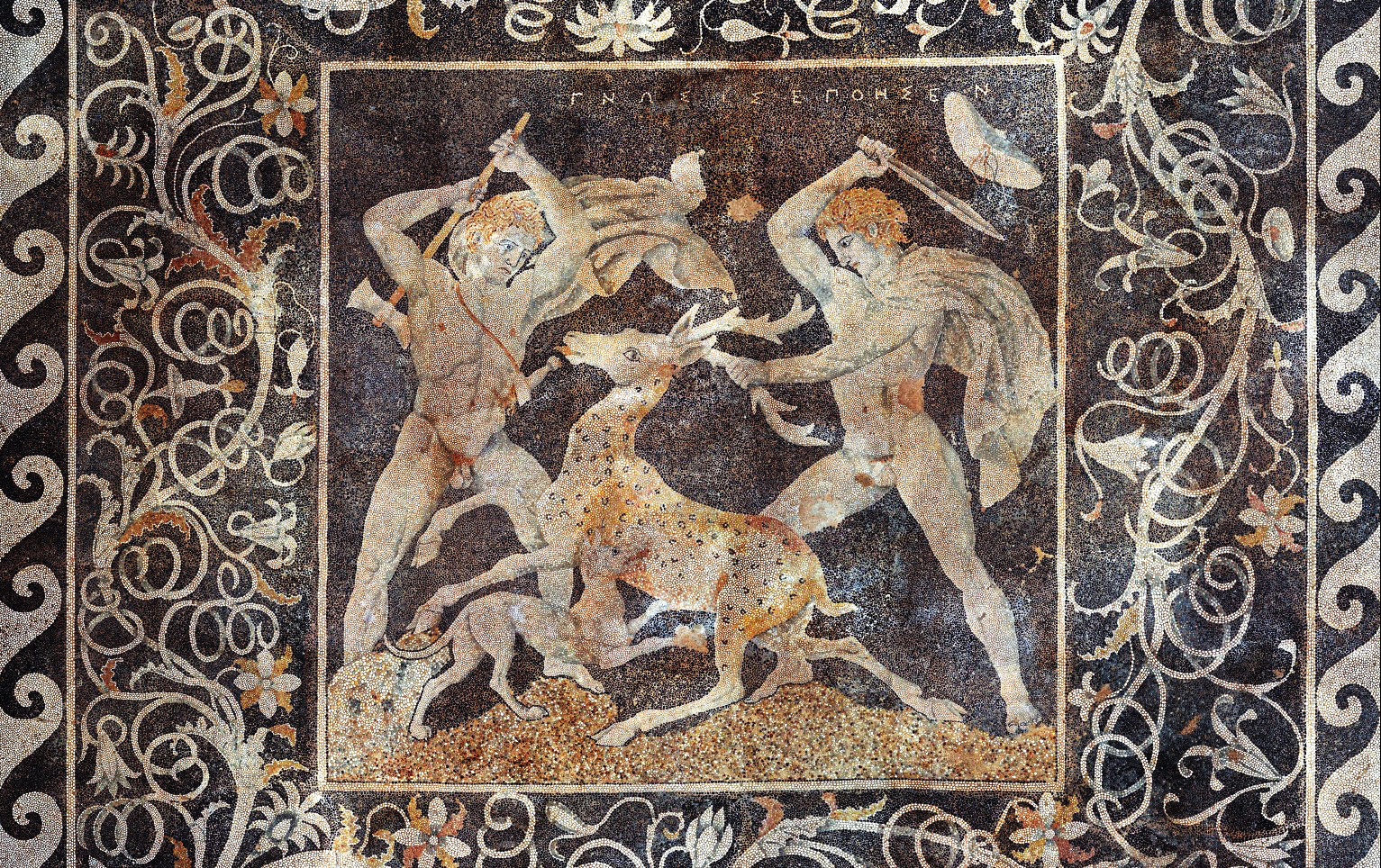
The Stag Hunt Mosaic at the Archaeological Museum of Pella (3rd century BC)

Antigonid control of the city-states was intermittent, with a number of revolts. Athens, Rhodes, Pergamum, and Aetolian League joined Rome against Macedon in the Macedonian Wars. The Achaean League, first allied to Ptolemies, was in effect independent and controlled most of Peloponnese. Sparta also remained independent, but generally refused to join any league.

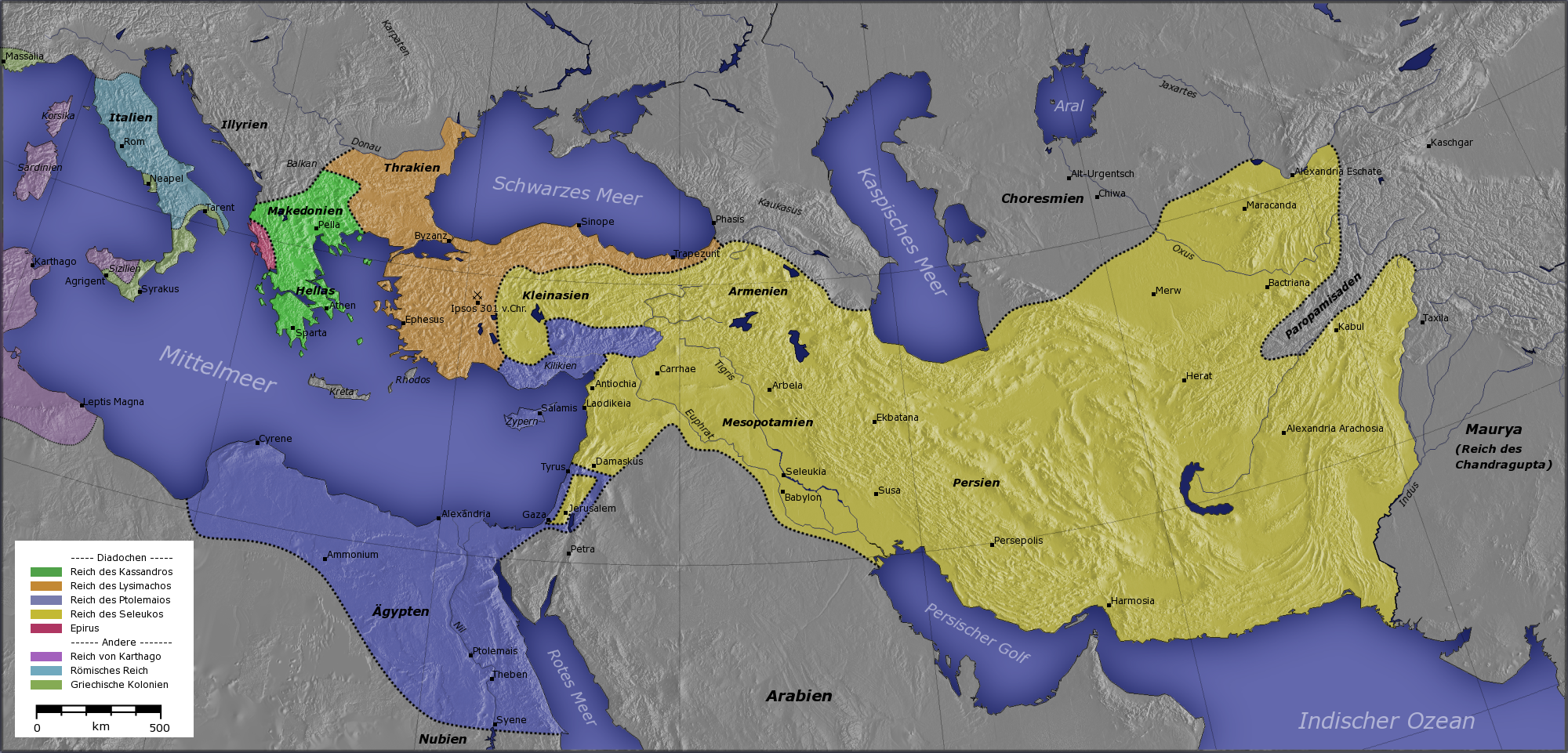
The major Hellenistic realms included the Diadoch kingdoms: Kingdom of Ptolemy I Soter Kingdom of Cassander Kingdom of Lysimachus Kingdom of Seleucus I Nicator Epirus Also shown on the map: Greek colonies Carthage (non-Greek) Rome (non-Greek) The orange areas were often in dispute after 281 BC. The Attalid kingdom occupied some of this area. Not shown: Indo-Greek Kingdom.

In 267 BC, Ptolemy II persuaded Athens and Sparta to revolt against Macedon in what became the Chremonidean War, named after the Athenian leader Chremonides. They were defeated and Athens lost her independence and democratic institutions. This marked the end of Athens as a political actor, although it remained the largest, wealthiest, and most cultivated city in Greece. Macedon defeated the Ptolemaic fleet at Cos and brought the Aegean islands, except Rhodes, under its rule as well.

Sparta remained hostile to the Achaeans, and in 227 BC it invaded Achaea and seized control of the League. The remaining Achaeans preferred distant Macedon to nearby Sparta and allied with the former. In 222 BC, the Macedonian army defeated the Spartans at the battle of Selassia.

Philip V of Macedon was the last Greek ruler with both the talent and the opportunity to unite Greece and preserve its independence against the ever-increasing power of Rome. Under his auspices, the Peace of Naupactus (217 BC) brought conflict between Macedon and the Greek leagues to an end, and at this time he controlled all of Greece except Athens, Rhodes, and Pergamum.

In 215 BC, however, Philip formed an alliance with Rome's enemy Carthage. Rome promptly lured the Achaean cities away from their nominal loyalty to Philip, and formed alliances with Rhodes and Pergamum, now the strongest power in Asia Minor. The First Macedonian War broke out in 212 BC and ended inconclusively in 205 BC, but Macedon was now marked as an enemy of Rome.

In 202 BC, Rome defeated Carthage and was free to turn her attention eastwards. In 198 BC, the Second Macedonian War broke out because Rome saw Macedon as a potential ally of the Seleucid Empire, the greatest power in the East. Philip's allies in Greece deserted him, and in 197 BC he was decisively defeated at the Battle of Cynoscephalae by the Roman proconsul Titus Quinctius Flaminius.

Luckily for the Greeks, Flaminius was a moderate man and an admirer of Greek culture. Philip had to surrender his fleet and become a Roman ally, but he was otherwise spared. At the Isthmian Games in 196 BC, Flaminius declared all the Greek cities free, although Roman garrisons were placed at Corinth and Chalcis. But the freedom promised by Rome was an illusion. All the cities except Rhodes were enrolled in a new League which Rome ultimately controlled, and aristocratic constitutions were favored and actively promoted.

== Roman Greece (146 BC – AD 324) ==
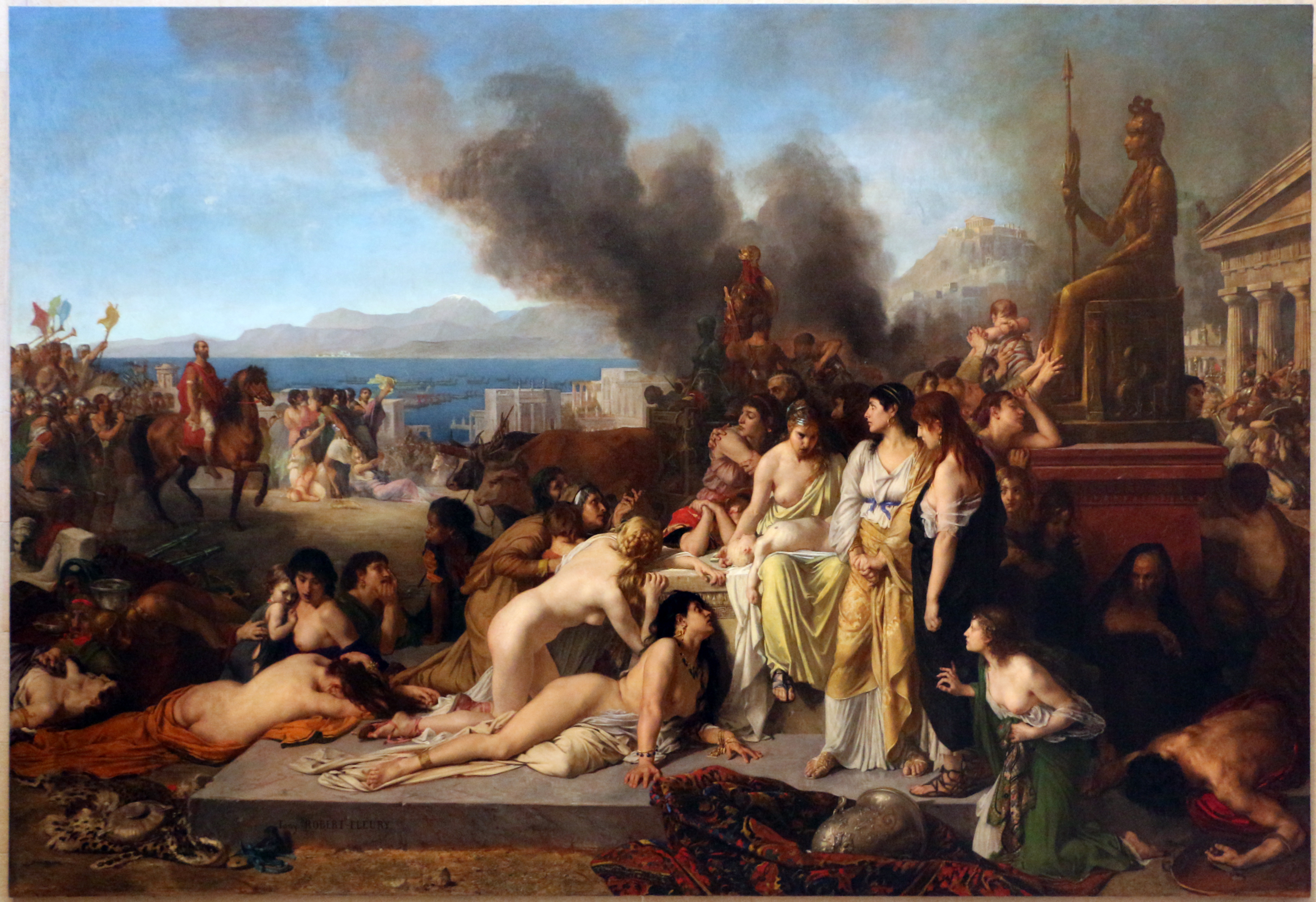
Depiction of the Battle of Corinth (146 BC) on the last day before Roman legions looted and burned the city of Corinth. The last day on Corinth, Tony Robert-Fleury, 1870.

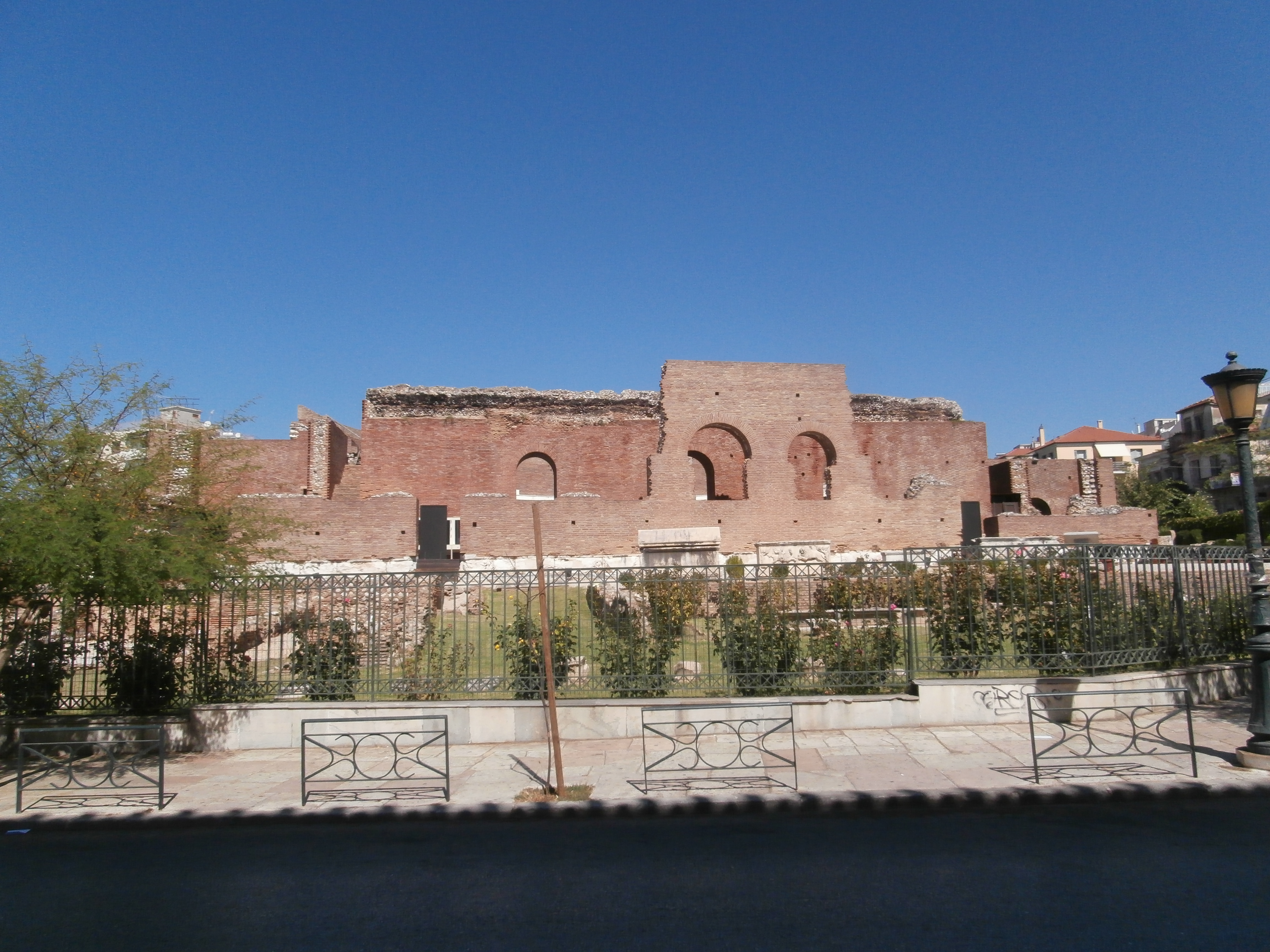
View of the Roman Odeon of Patras

In the 148 and 146 BC, Greece was conquered by the Roman Republic and came under its control. Still, Greek culture flourished during this period - city-states maintained a level of political autonomy, and Roman society adopted many aspects of Greek culture.

Macedonia had already come under Roman control with the defeat of its king, Perseus, by the Roman Aemilius Paullus at Pydna in 168 BC with the Romans initially dividing the region into four smaller republics.

Macedonia officially becaming a Roman province in 146 BC, with its capital at Thessalonica, around the time of the sack of Corinth by Lucius Mummius, and the period Roman rule in Greece conventionally is dated as starting from. The rest of the Greek city-states eventually paid homage to Rome, ending their de jure autonomy as well. The Romans left local administration to the Greeks without making any attempt to abolish traditional political patterns. The agora in Athens continued to be the center of civic and political life.

Emperor Caracalla's decree in 212 AD, the Constitutio Antoniniana, extended citizenship outside Italy to all free adult men in the entire Roman Empire, effectively raising provincial populations to equal status with the city of Rome itself. The importance of this decree is historical, not political. It set the basis for integration, where the economic and judicial mechanisms of the state could be applied throughout the Mediterranean as was once done from Latium into all Italy. In practice, integration did not take place uniformly. Societies already integrated with Rome, such as Greece, were favored by the decree, as opposed to the further away, poorer, or more culturally different provinces like Britain, Palestine, or Egypt.

Caracalla's decree did not set in motion the processes that led to the transfer of power from Italy and the West to Greece and the East, but rather accelerated them, setting the foundations for the millennium-long rise of Greece, in the form of the Byzantine Empire, as a major power in Europe and the Mediterranean in the Middle Ages.

== Middle Ages ==
=== Byzantine rule (324–1204) ===
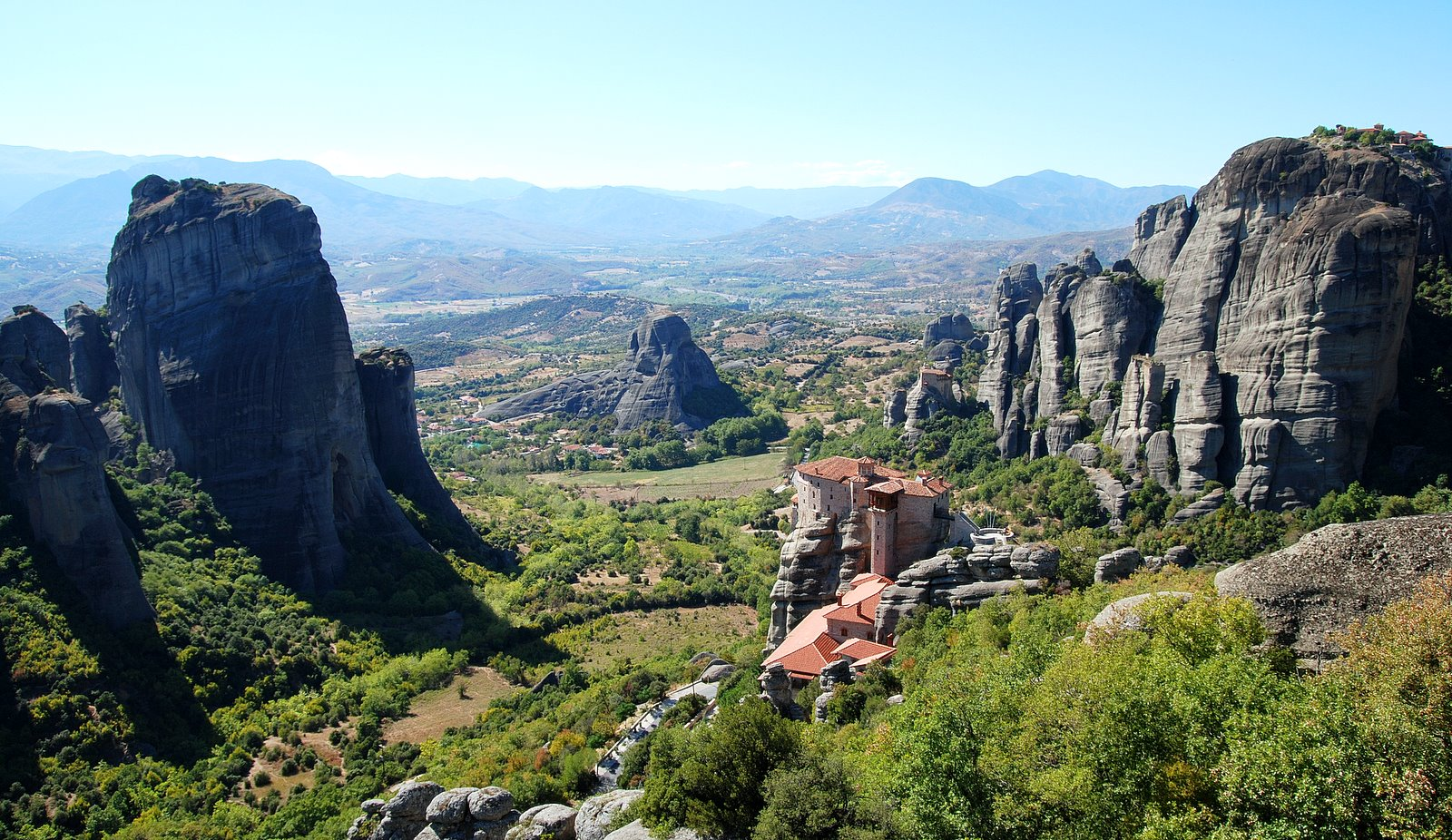
Byzantine-era Orthodox monasteries in Meteora.

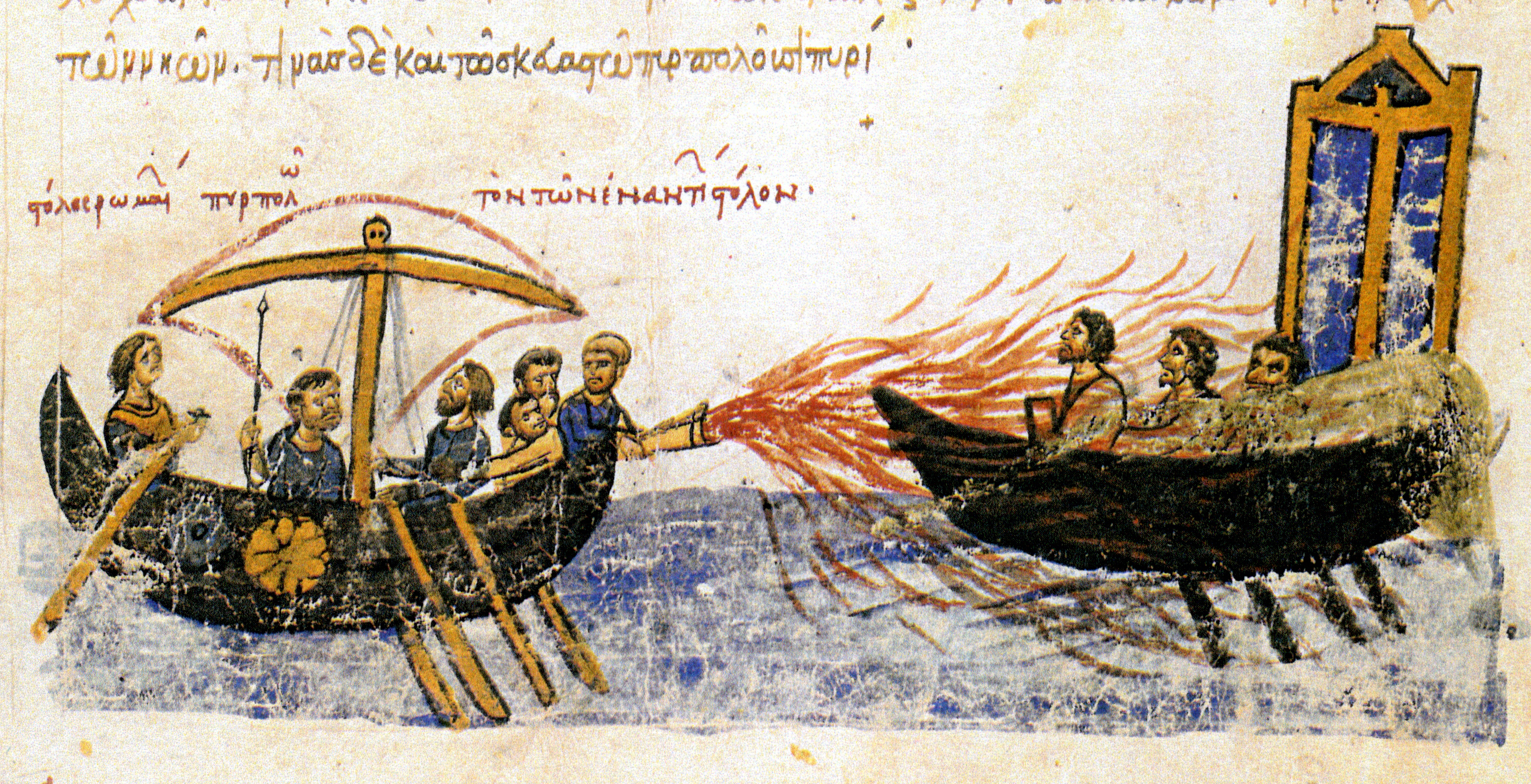
Depiction of the Greek fire in John Skylitzes' Madrid Skylitzes (late 11th century).

The division of the Roman Empire into East and West and the subsequent collapse of the Western one accentuated the position of Greece in the empire and eventually brought it into the imperial center of power. Constantinople (now modern-day Istanbul) became the central city of the empire when Constantine the Great declared Byzantium the new capital of the Roman Empire, renaming the city in his honor. This political change signified the broader eastward migration of Hellenism toward Anatolia, and it nominally placed the city as the center of Hellenic culture, a beacon for Greeks that lasted into the modern era.

The East Roman Empire, now also known as the Byzantine Empire, was dominated politically by Emperors Constantine the Great and Justinian from 324 to 610. Assimilating the Roman tradition, the emperors sought to build the foundation for later developments and formation of the Empire. The early centuries of the Empire were marked by efforts to secure its borders and restore the Roman territories, as well as the formation and establishment of the Orthodox Church and several of religious schisms following it.

In the first period of the middle Byzantine era (610–867), the empire was attacked both by old enemies (Persians, Lombards, Avars, and Slavs) as well as by new ones (Arabs, Bulgars). The main characteristic of this period was instability, as enemy attacks tended to extend deep into the Empire's interior, even threatening the capital itself.

The attacks of the Slavs became less frequent as the Slavic migrations to the Balkans ended and permanent Slavic settlements and states began to form. Initially hostile to Constantinople until their Christianization, the Byzantines referred to these tribes and states as Sclavinias.

Changes also occurred in the internal structure of the empire, due to both external and internal conditions. The predominance of small free farmers, the expansion of military estates, and the development of the system of themes brought to completion the developments started by early Byzantine Emperors. Cultural and religious changes occurred as well. Byzantine administration and society became inseparably Greek. Additionally, the restoration of Orthodoxy after the iconoclast movements (726–787 and 814–842) allowed the successful resumption of missionary action among neighboring peoples and their placement within the sphere of Byzantine cultural influence. During this period, the Empire was geographically reduced and economically damaged since it lost wealth-producing regions. However, it obtained greater lingual, dogmatic, and cultural homogeneity.

From the late 8th century, the Empire began to recover from the devastating impact of successive invasions, and the reconquest of the Greek peninsula began. Greeks from Sicily and Asia Minor were brought in as settlers. Slavs were either driven out to Asia Minor or assimilated, and the Sclavinias were forcibly eradicated. By the middle of the 9th century, the Greek peninsula was under Byzantine control again, and its cities began to recover due to improved security and the restoration of effective central control.

=== Economic prosperity ===
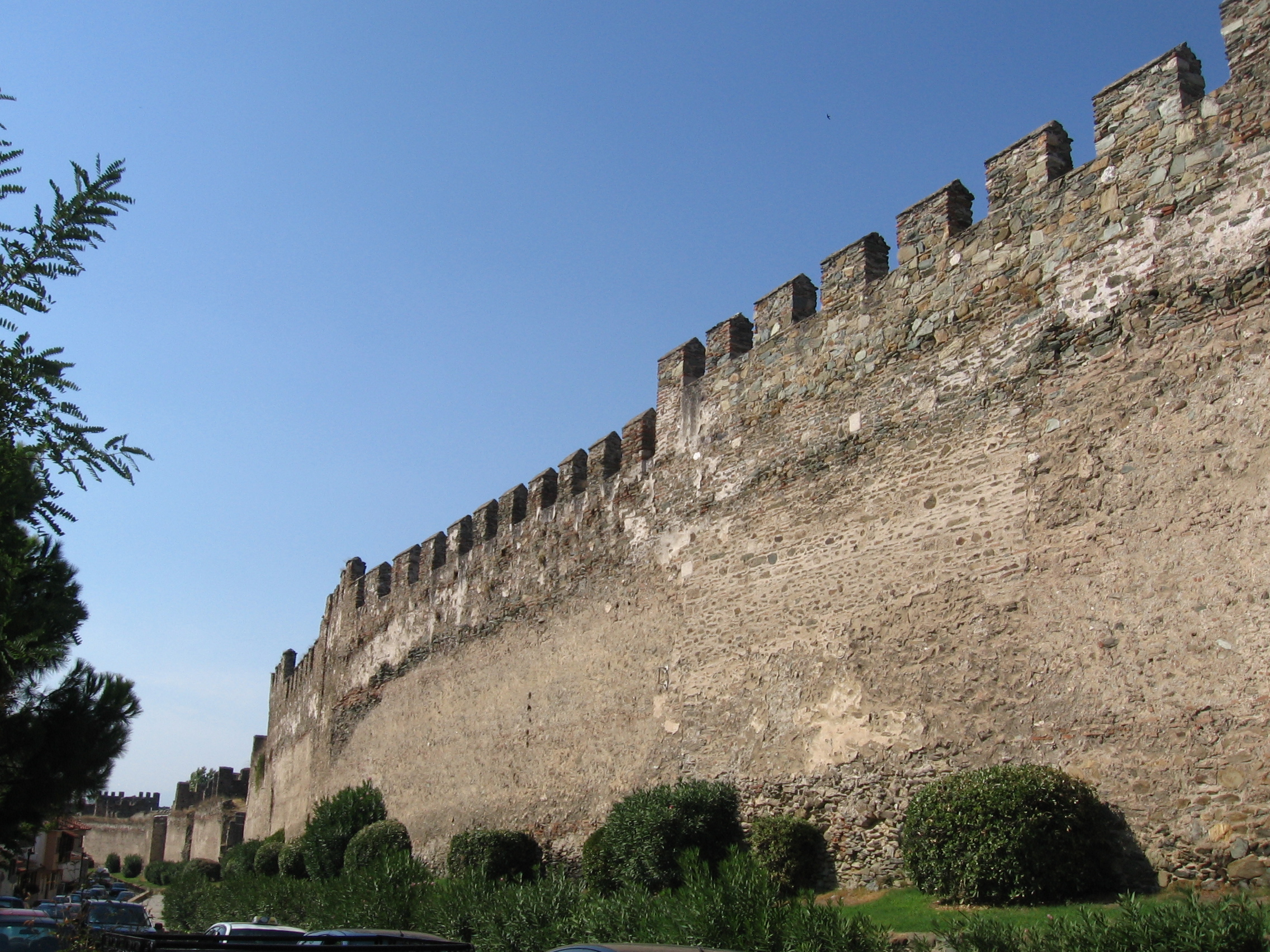
Part of the Byzantine Walls of Thessaloniki

After the Byzantine Empire was rescued from a period of crisis through the resolute leadership of the three Komnenoi emperors Alexios, John, and Manuel in the 12th century, Greece prospered. Recent research has revealed that this period was a time of significant growth in the rural economy, with rising population levels and extensive tracts of new agricultural land being brought into production. The widespread construction of new rural churches around this time is a strong indication that prosperity was being generated even in remote areas.

A steady increase in population led to a higher population density, and there is good evidence that the demographic increase was accompanied by the revival of towns. According to Alan Harvey's Economic Expansion in the Byzantine Empire 900–1200, towns expanded significantly in the twelfth century. Archaeological evidence shows an increase in the size of urban settlements, together with a "notable upsurge" in new towns. It also indicates that many medieval towns, including Athens, Thessaloniki, Thebes, and Corinth, experienced a period of rapid and sustained growth, starting in the 11th century and continuing until the end of the 12th century.

The growth of the towns attracted trade with the Venetian Republic in nearby Italy, and this interest in trade appears to have further increased economic prosperity in Greece. The Venetians and others were active traders in the ports of the Holy Land, and they made a living out of shipping goods between the Crusader Kingdoms of Outremer and the West while also trading extensively with Byzantium and Egypt.

=== Artistic revival ===
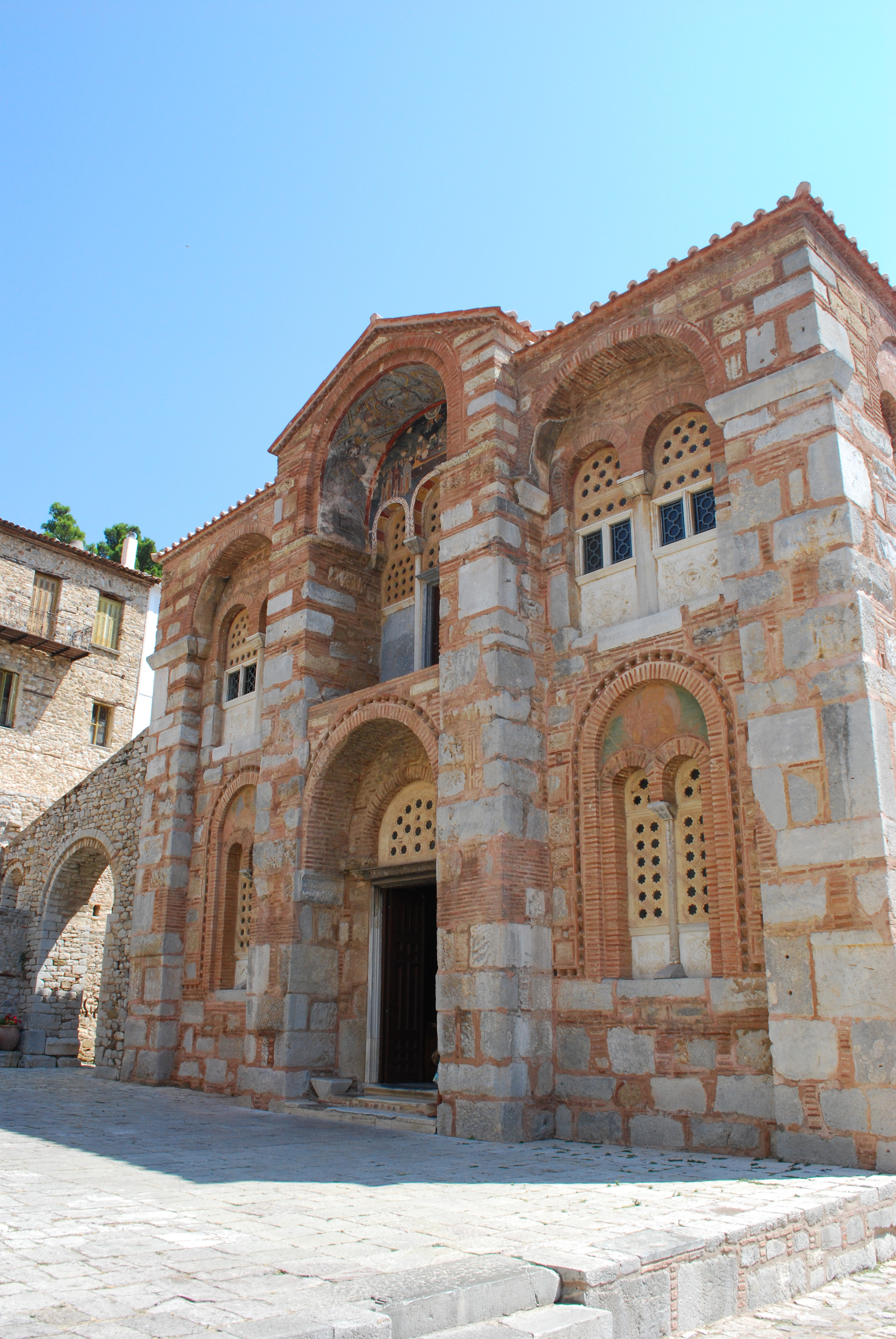
Exterior view of Hosios Loukas monastery, artistic example of the Macedonian Renaissance

A renaissance of Byzantine art began in the 10th century. Many of the most important Byzantine churches in and around Athens, for example, were built around this time. This artistic revival reflects the urbanization of Greece during this period. There was also a revival in mosaic art, with artists showing great interest in depicting natural landscapes with wild animals and scenes from the hunt. Mosaics became more realistic and vivid, with an increased emphasis on depicting three-dimensional forms. With its love of luxury and passion for color, the art of this age delighted in the production of masterpieces that spread the fame of Byzantium throughout the Christian world.

Beautiful silks from the workshops of Constantinople portrayed animals in dazzling color, such as lions, elephants, eagles, and griffins confronting each other, or Emperors gorgeously arrayed on horseback or engaged in the chase. The eyes of many patrons were attracted and the economy of Greece grew. In the provinces, regional schools of architecture began producing many distinctive styles that drew on a range of cultural influences. All this suggests that there was an increased demand for art, with more people having access to the necessary wealth to commission and pay for such work.

Yet the marvelous expansion of Byzantine art during this period, one of the most remarkable facts in the history of the empire, did not stop there. From the 10th to the 12th century, Byzantium was the main source of artistic inspiration for the West. For example, the mosaics of St. Mark's Basilica the Torcello Cathedral in Venice clearly show Byzantine influence in their style, arrangement, and iconography. Similarly in Sicily, the mosaics of the Palatine Chapel, Martorana, and Monreale Cathedral in Palermo, as well as the Cefalù Cathedral, show the influence of Byzantine art on Norman Sicily in the 12th century.

Andalusian art in Western Europe was also influenced by Byzantium. Romanesque art, too, contains many Byzantine elements, including its decorative forms and the plans of some of its buildings (e.g., the domed churches of south-western France). Princes of Kiev, Venetian Doges, abbots of Monte Cassino, merchants of Amalfi, and the Norman kings of Sicily all drew from Byzantine culture in their art.

=== The Fourth Crusade (1204) ===
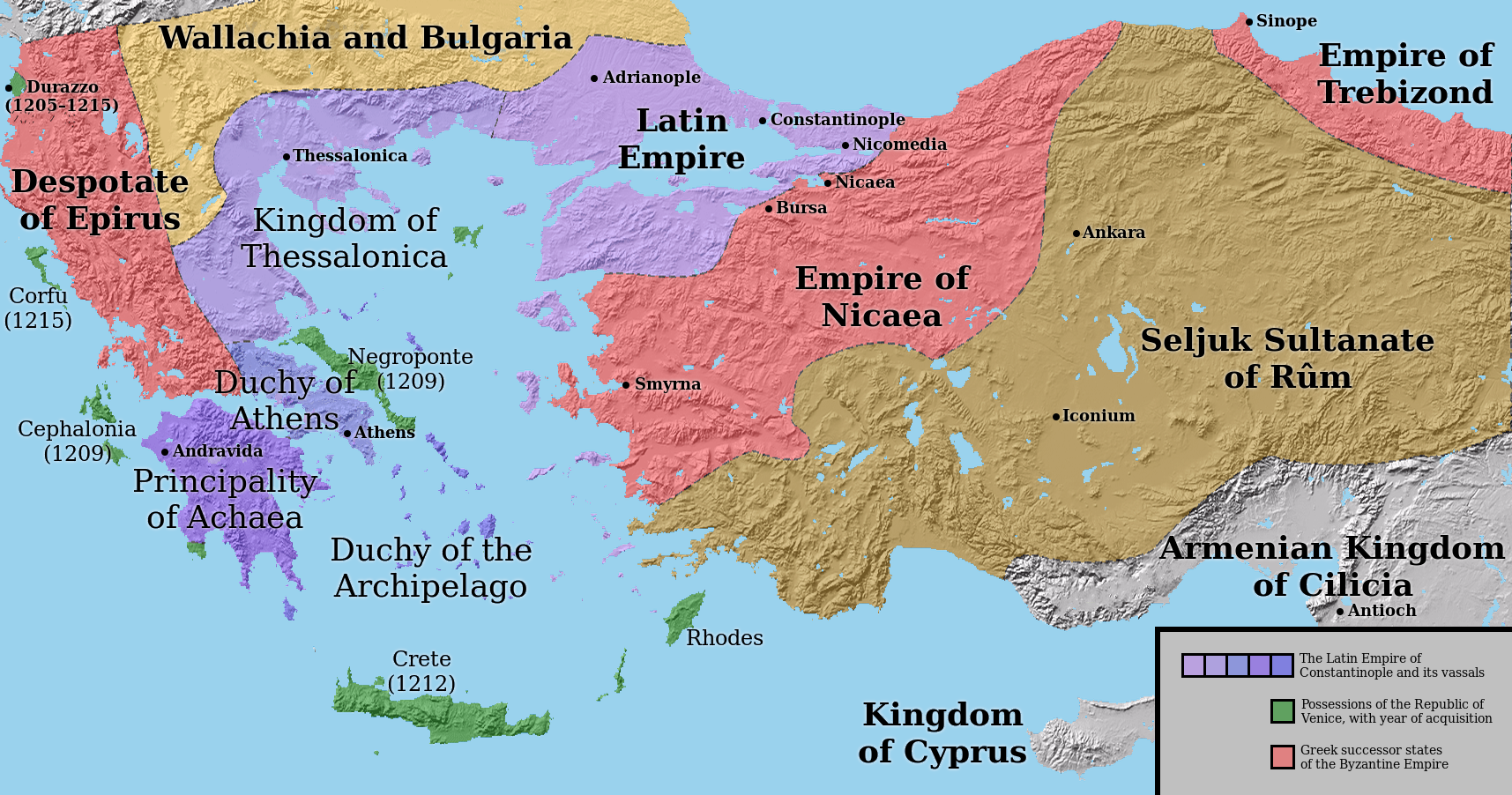
The division of the Byzantine Empire after the Fourth Crusade.

The year 1204 marks the beginning of the Late Byzantine period, when Constantinople and a number of Byzantine territories were conquered by the Latins during the Fourth Crusade. During this period, a number of Byzantine Greek successor states emerged. The Empire of Nicaea, the Despotate of Epirus, and the Empire of Trebizond each claimed to be the legitimate successor of the Byzantine Empire. Meanwhile, the Latin and Frank Crusaders founded the Catholic Latin Empire, known to the Byzantines as Frankokratia or Latinokratia, with Constantinople as its capital. Among its vassal states were the Principality of Achaea, the Duchy of Athens, the Duchy of the Archipelago, and the Kingdom of Thessalonica. Under the Latin Empire, elements of feudalism entered medieval Greek life.

=== From partial Byzantine restoration to 1453 ===
The Latin Empire lasted only 57 years, and in 1261 Constantinople was reclaimed by the Nicaean Empire and the Byzantine Empire was restored. However, in mainland Greece and the Greek islands, various Latin and Venetian possessions continued to exist. From 1261 onwards, Byzantium underwent a gradual weakening of its internal structures and the reduction of its territories from Ottoman invasions, culminating in the fall of Constantinople on May 29, 1453, marking the end of the Empire. The Ottoman conquest of Constantinople resulted in also the end of the Byzantine period of Greek history.

== Venetian and Ottoman rule (15th century – 1821) ==
The Greeks held out in the Peloponnese until 1460, and the Venetians and Genoese clung to some of the islands, but by the early 16th century all of mainland Greece and most of the Aegean Islands were conquered by the Ottoman Empire, excluding several port cities still held by the Venetians (Nafplio, Monemvasia, Parga and Methone the most important of them). The Cyclades, in the middle of the Aegean Sea, were officially annexed by the Ottomans in 1579, although they were under vassal status since the 1530s. Cyprus fell in 1571, and the Venetians retained Crete until 1669. The Ionian Islands were never ruled by the Ottomans, with the exception of Kefalonia (from 1479 to 1481 and from 1485 to 1500), and they remained under the rule of the Republic of Venice. It was in the Ionian Islands where modern Greek statehood was born, with the creation of the Republic of the Seven Islands in 1800.

When the Ottomans arrived, two Greek migrations occurred. In the first, the Greek intelligentsia migrated to Western Europe, influencing the advent of the European Renaissance. In the second, Greeks left the plains of the Greek peninsula and resettled in the mountains.

Ottoman Greece was a multiethnic society, but in a way very different from the modern Western notion of multiculturalism. The Greeks were given some privileges and freedom by the Empire, but they were exposed to tyranny deriving from malpractices of regional administrative personnel, over which the central government had only remote and incomplete control. The Ottoman millet system contributed to the ethnic cohesion of Orthodox Greeks by segregating the various peoples within the Ottoman Empire based on religion. Greeks living in the plains during Ottoman rule were either Christians or crypto-Christians, Greek "Muslims" who were secret practitioners of the Greek Orthodox faith. Some Greeks became crypto-Christians to avoid heavy taxes while retaining their religious identity and ties to the Greek Orthodox Church. Greeks who converted to Islam and were not crypto-Christians were deemed "Turks" in the eyes of Orthodox Greeks even if they did not adopt the Turkish language, evidence of the ethnic and religious tensions in Greece under Ottoman rule.

The Ottomans ruled most of Greece until the early 19th century. The first self-governed Hellenic state since the Middle Ages was established on the Ionian islands during the French Revolutionary Wars in 1800, 21 years before the outbreak of the Greek revolution in mainland Greece. It was called the Septinsular Republic (Greek: Ἑπτάνησος Πολιτεία), or Republic of the Seven United Islands, and it used Corfu as its capital.

== Modern Greek nation state (1821 – present) ==
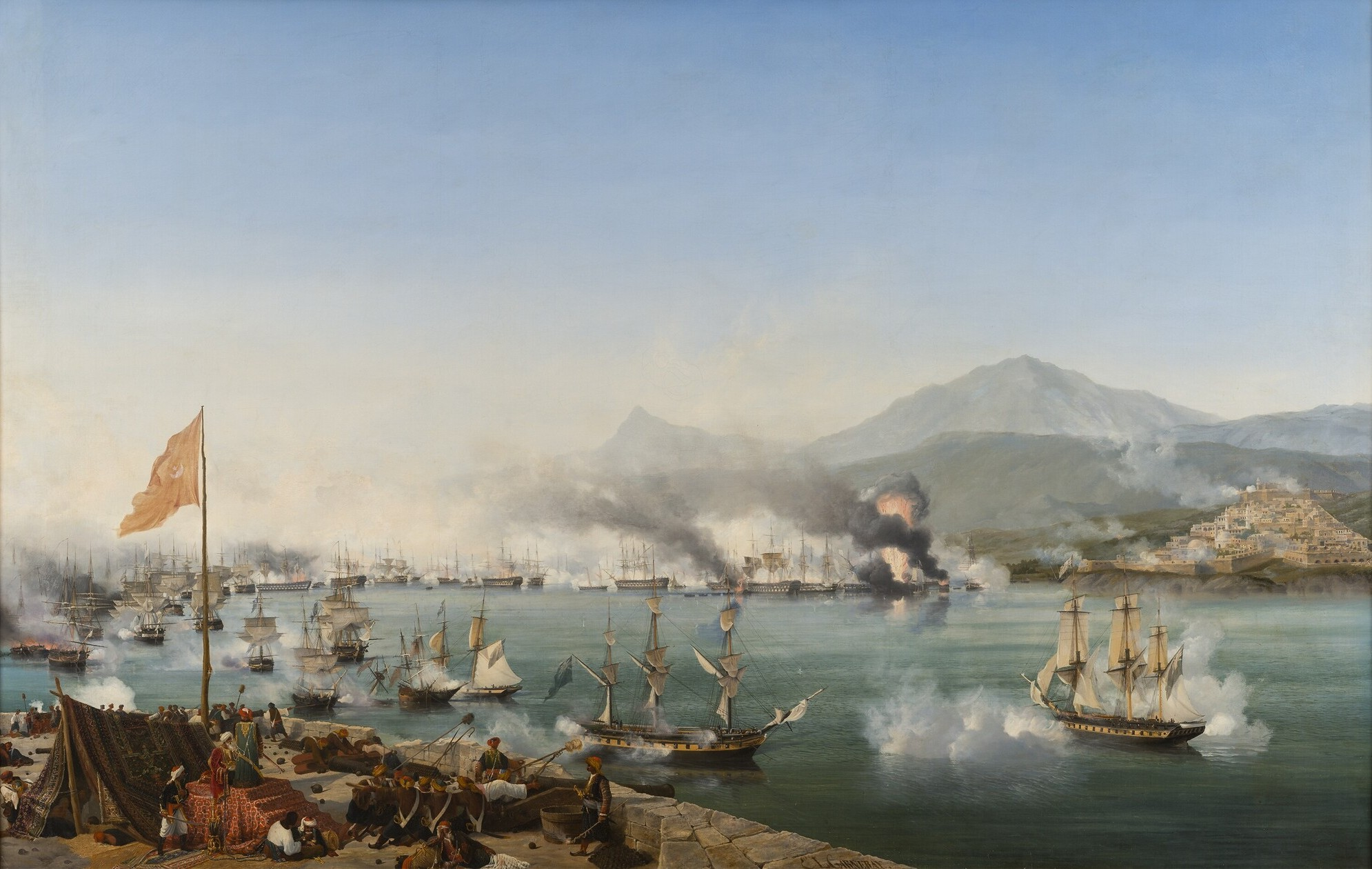
The Battle of Navarino, in October 1827, marked the effective end of Ottoman rule in Greece.

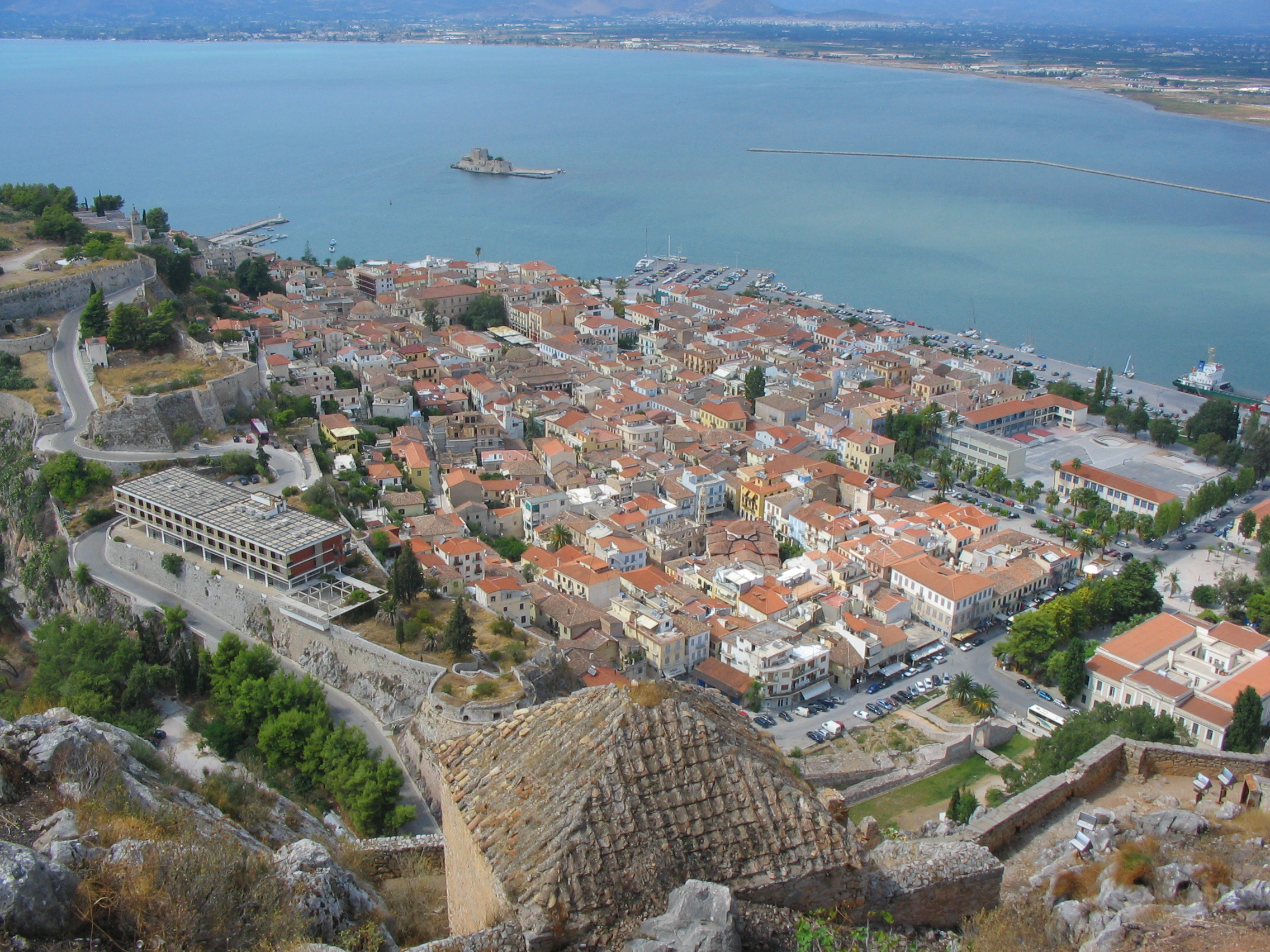
Nafplio, the first capital of independent Greece during the governance of Ioannis Kapodistrias

In the early months of 1821, the Greeks declared their independence, but did not achieve it until 1829. The Great Powers first shared the same view concerning the necessity of preserving the status quo of the Ottoman Empire, but soon changed their stance. Scores of non-Greek philhellenes volunteered to fight for the cause, including Lord Byron.

On October 20, 1827, a combined British, French and Russian naval force destroyed the Ottoman and Egyptian armada. The Russian minister of foreign affairs, Ioannis Kapodistrias, himself a Septinsular Greek, returned home as Governor of the First Republic and with his diplomatic handling, managed to secure the Greek independence and the military domination in Central Greece. The first capital of the independent Greece was temporarily Aigina (1828–1829) and later officially Nafplion (1828–1834). After his assassination, the European powers turned Greece into a monarchy; the first King, Otto, came from Bavaria and the second, George I, from Denmark. In 1834, King Otto transferred the capital to Athens.

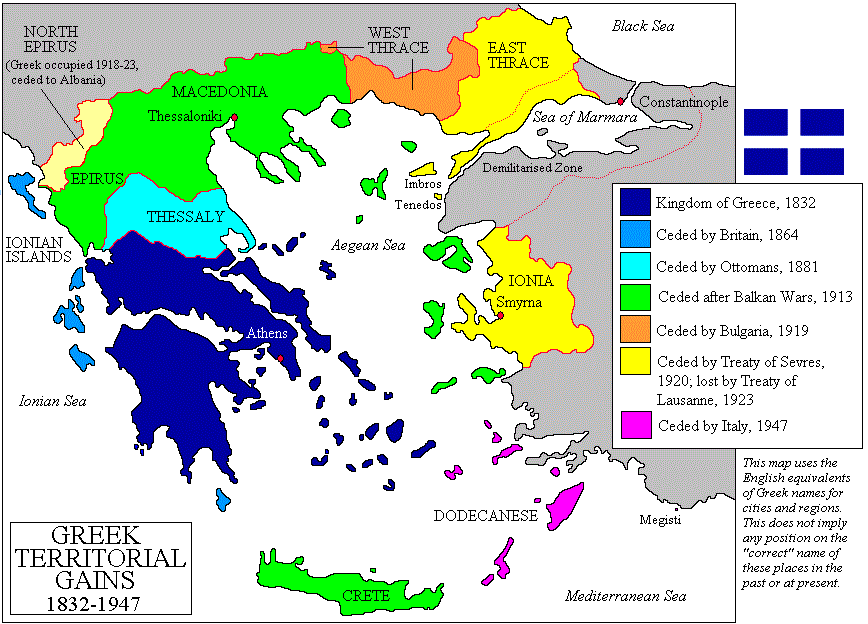
The territorial evolution of Kingdom of Greece until 1947

During the 19th and early 20th centuries, Greece sought to enlarge its boundaries to include the ethnic Greek population of the Ottoman Empire. Greece played a peripheral role in the Crimean War. When Russia attacked the Ottoman Empire in 1853, Greek leaders saw an opportunity to expand North and South into Ottoman areas that had a Christian majority. However, Greece did not coordinate its plans with Russia, did not declare war, and received no outside military or financial support. The French and British seized its major port and effectively neutralized the Greek army. Greek efforts to cause insurrections failed as they were easily crushed by Ottoman forces. Greece was not invited to the peace conference and made no gains out of the war. The frustrated Greek leadership blamed the King for failing to take advantage of the situation; his popularity plunged and he was later forced to abdicate. The Ionian Islands were given by Britain upon the arrival of the new King George I in 1863 and Thessaly was ceded by the Ottomans in 1880.

=== Modernization ===
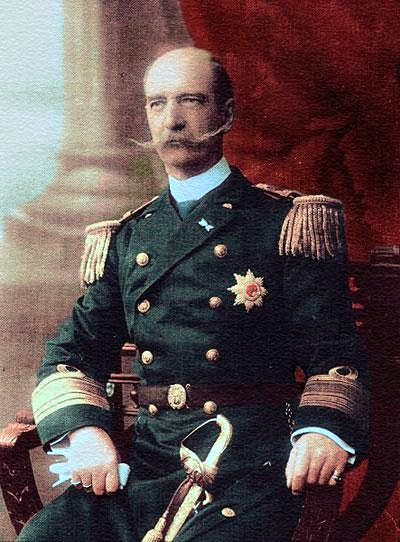
George I was King of the Hellenes from 1862 to 1913

In the late 19th century, modernization transformed the social structure of Greece. The population grew rapidly, putting heavy pressure on the system of small farms with low productivity. Overall, population density more than doubled from 41 persons per square mile in 1829 to 114 in 1912 (16 to 44 per km^{2}). One response was emigration to the United States, with a quarter million people leaving between 1906 and 1914. Entrepreneurs found numerous business opportunities in the retail and restaurant sectors of American cities; some sent money back to their families, others returned with hundreds of dollars, enough to purchase a farm or a small business in the old village. The urban population tripled from 8% in 1853 to 24% in 1907. Athens grew from a village of 6000 people in 1834, when it became the capital, to 63,000 in 1879, 111,000 in 1896, and 167,000 in 1907.

In Athens and other cities, men arriving from rural areas set up workshops and stores, creating a middle class. They joined with bankers, professional men, university students, and military officers, to demand reform and modernization of the political and economic system. Athens became the center of the merchant marine, which quadrupled from 250,000 tons in 1875 to more than 1,000,000 tons in 1915. As the cities modernized, businessmen adopted the latest styles of Western European architecture. During this period there was a gradual development of industry (including heavy industry, such as shipbuilding), initially centered in Ermoupolis and Piraeus.

=== Balkan Wars ===
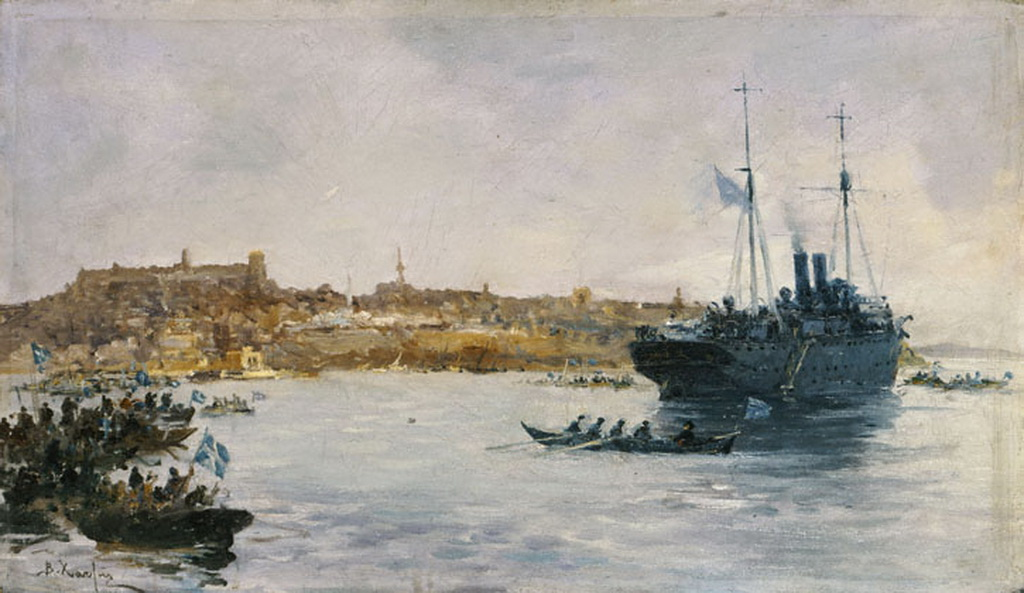
The landing of Greek troops in Kavala during the Balkan Wars

The participation of Greece in the Balkan Wars of 1912–1913 is one of the most important episodes in modern Greek history, as it allowed the Greek state to almost double its size and achieve most of its present territorial size. As a result of the Balkan Wars of 1912–1913, most of Epirus, Macedonia, Crete and the northern Aegean islands were incorporated into the Kingdom of Greece.

=== World War I and Greco-Turkish War ===
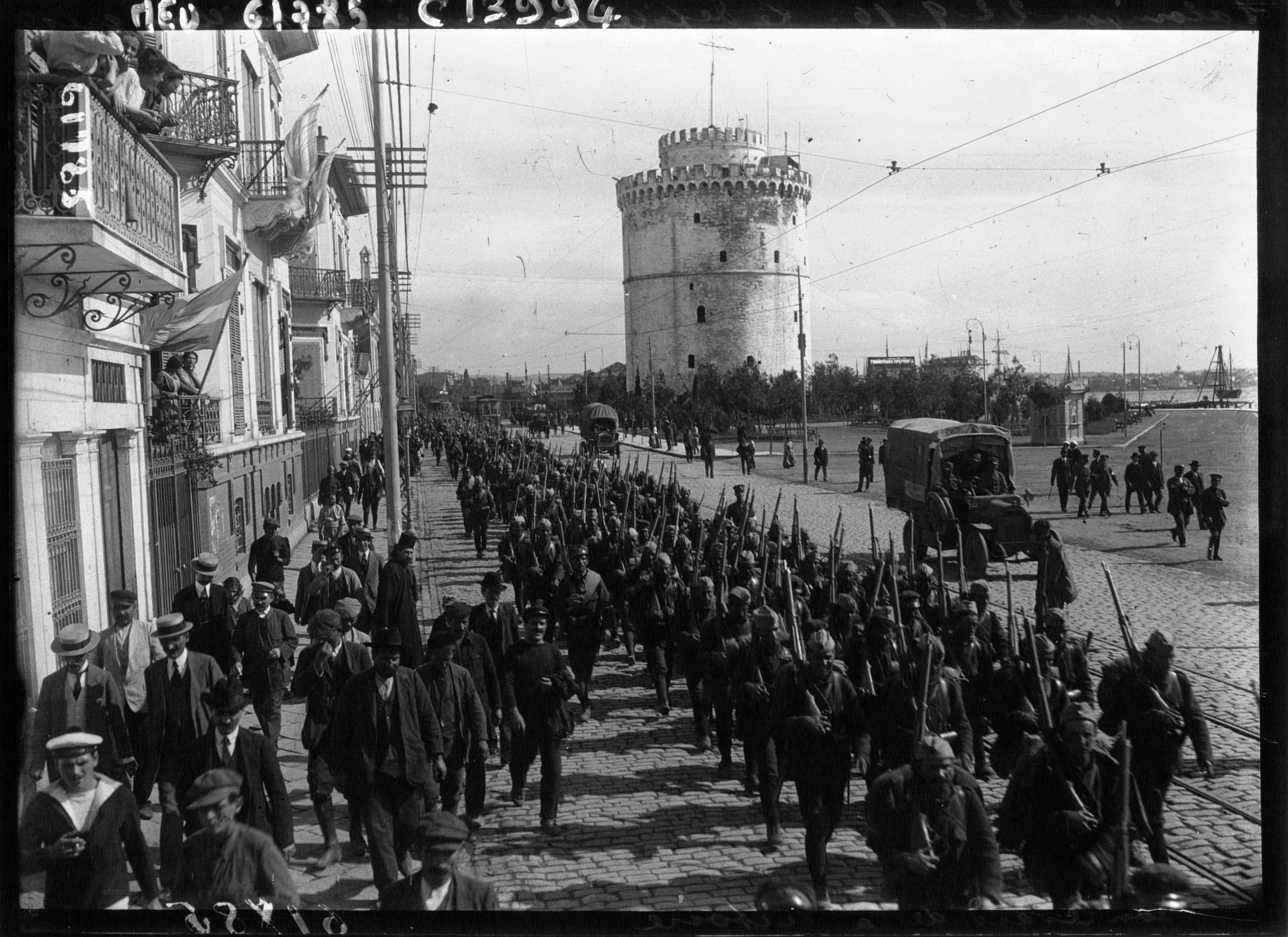
The I Battalion of the Army of National Defence marches on its way to the front, 1916. Greece joined the Allies in summer 1917.

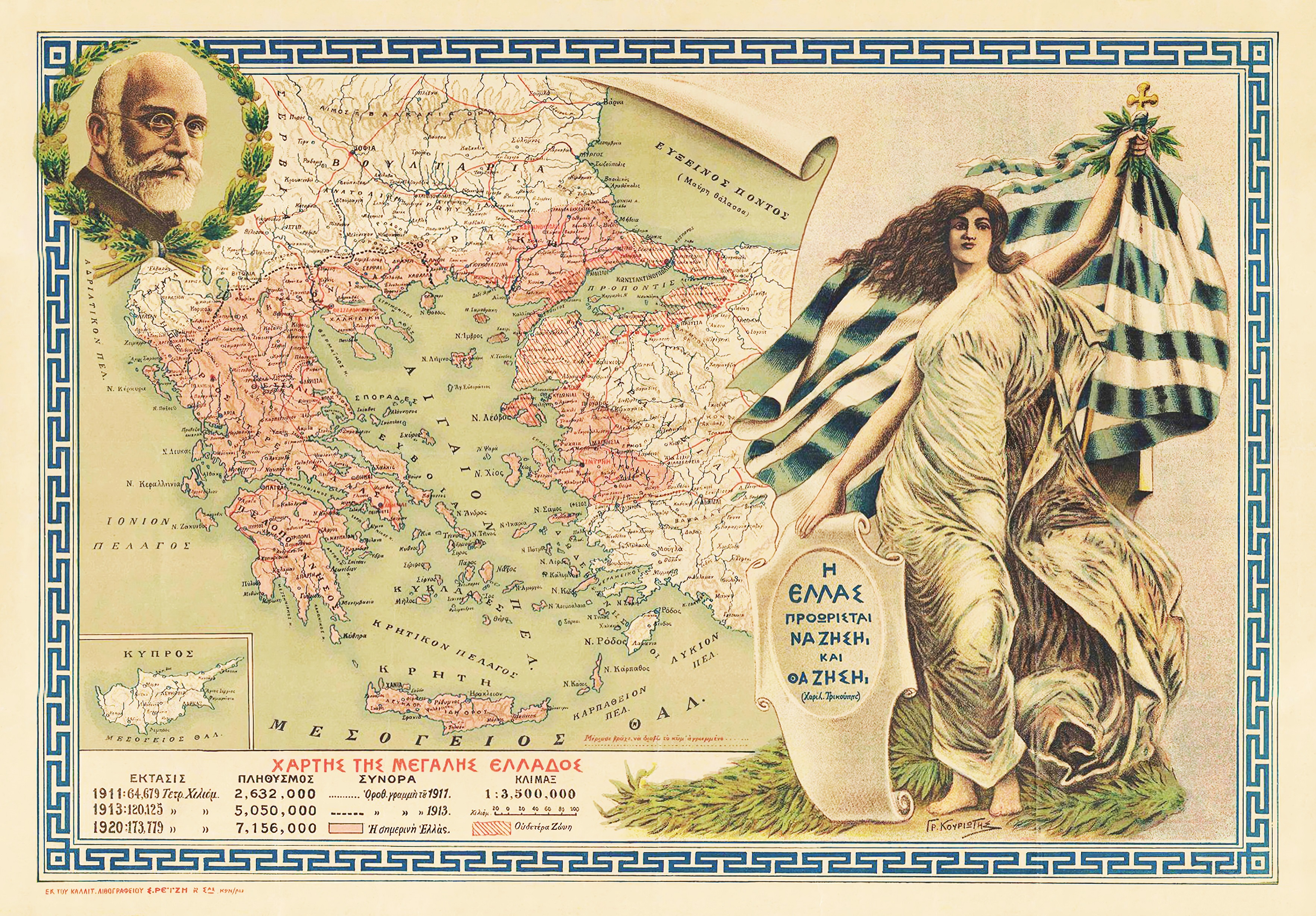
A map of Greater Greece after the Treaty of Sèvres, when the Megali Idea seemed close to fulfillment, featuring Eleftherios Venizelos.

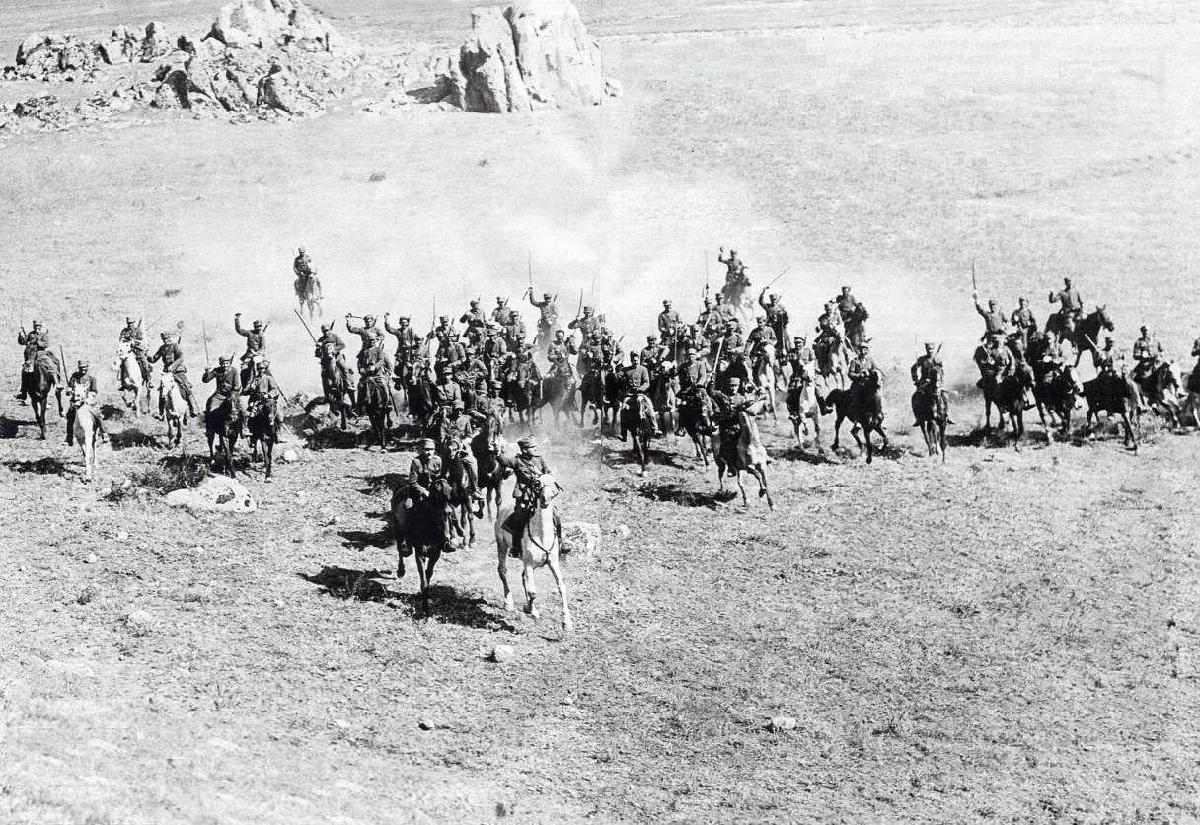
Greek cavalry attacking during the Greco-Turkish War (1919–1922).

The outbreak of World War I in 1914 produced a split in Greek politics, with King Constantine I, an admirer of Germany, calling for neutrality while Prime Minister Eleftherios Venizelos pushed for Greece to join the Allies. The conflict between the monarchists and the Venizelists sometimes resulted in open warfare and became known as the National Schism. In 1917, the Allies forced Constantine to abdicate in favor of his son Alexander and Venizelos returned as premier. At the end of the war, the Great Powers agreed that the Ottoman city of Smyrna (İzmir) and its hinterland, both of which had large Greek populations, be handed over to Greece.

Greek troops occupied Smyrna in 1919, and in 1920 the Treaty of Sèvres was signed by the Ottoman government; the treaty stipulated that in five years' time a plebiscite would be held in Smyrna on whether the region would join Greece. However, Turkish nationalists, led by Mustafa Kemal Atatürk, overthrew the Ottoman government and organised a military campaign against the Greek troops, resulting in the Greco-Turkish War (1919–1922). A major Greek offensive ground to a halt in 1921, and by 1922 Greek troops were in retreat. The Turkish forces recaptured Smyrna on 9 September 1922, and then a fire broke out in the city. It is debatable who is responsible for the fire. The fire resulted in the deaths of Armenians and Greeks in Smyrna.

The war was concluded by the Treaty of Lausanne (1923), according to which there was to be a population exchange between Greece and Turkey on the basis of religion. Over one million Orthodox Christians left Turkey in exchange for 400,000 Muslims from Greece. The events of 1919–1922 are regarded in Greece as a particularly calamitous period of history. Between 1914 and 1923, an estimated 750,000 to 900,000 Greeks died at the hands of the Ottoman Turks, in what many scholars have termed a genocide.

=== Interwar to World War II ===
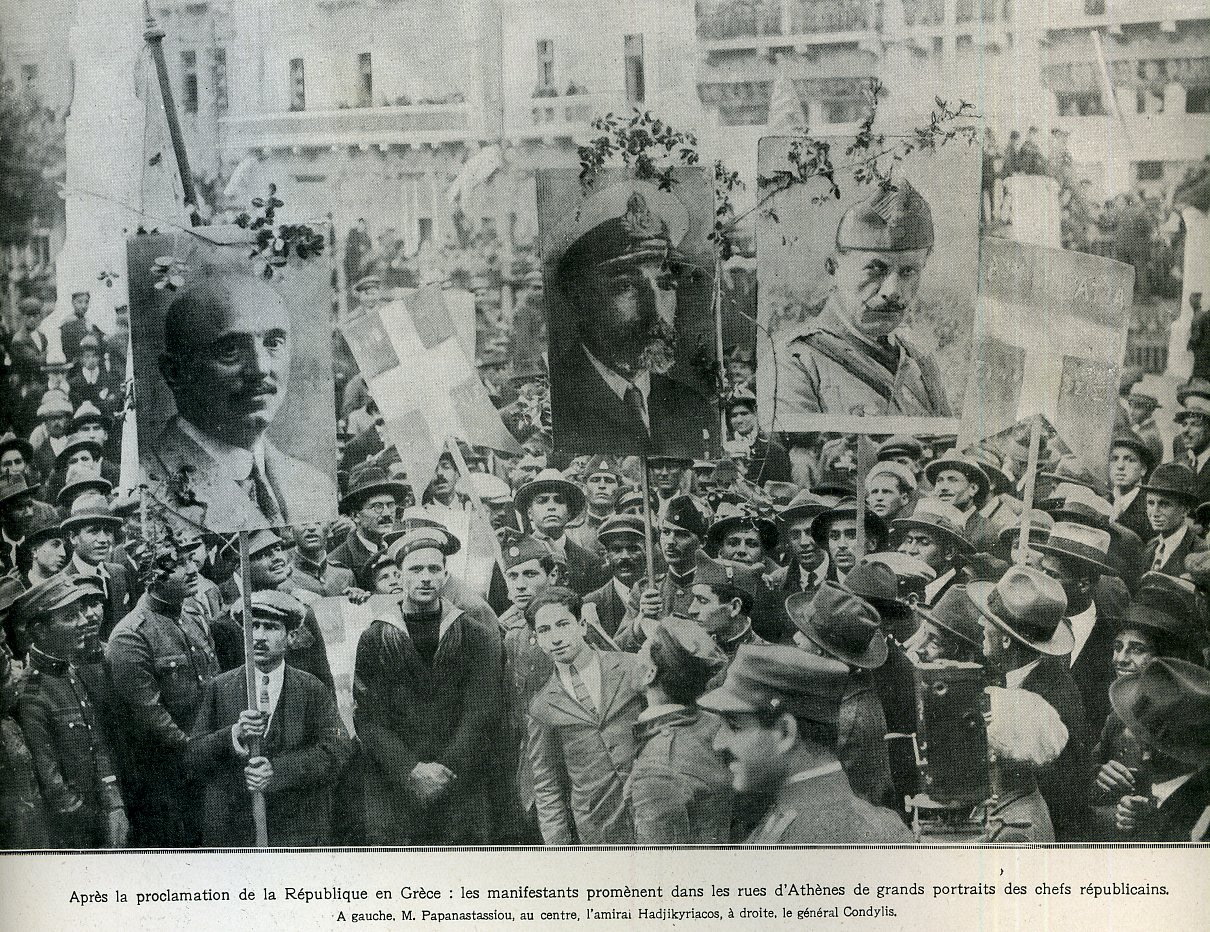
Proclamation of the Second Hellenic Republic in 1924. Crowds holding placards depicting Alexandros Papanastasiou, Georgios Kondylis and Alexandros Hatzikyriakos

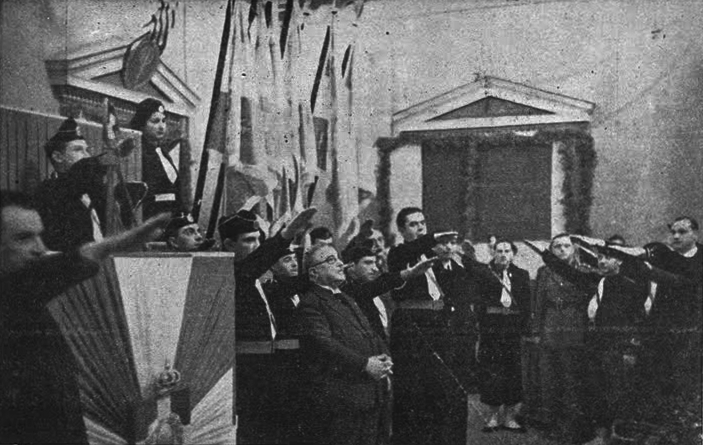
Members of the National Organisation of Youth (EON) salute in presence of dictator Metaxas (1938)

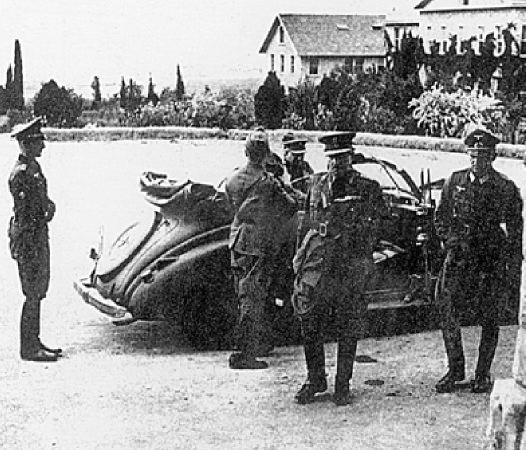
Georgios Tsolakoglou with Wehrmacht officers arrives at Macedonia Hall of Anatolia College in Thessaloniki, to sign the surrender (April 1941)

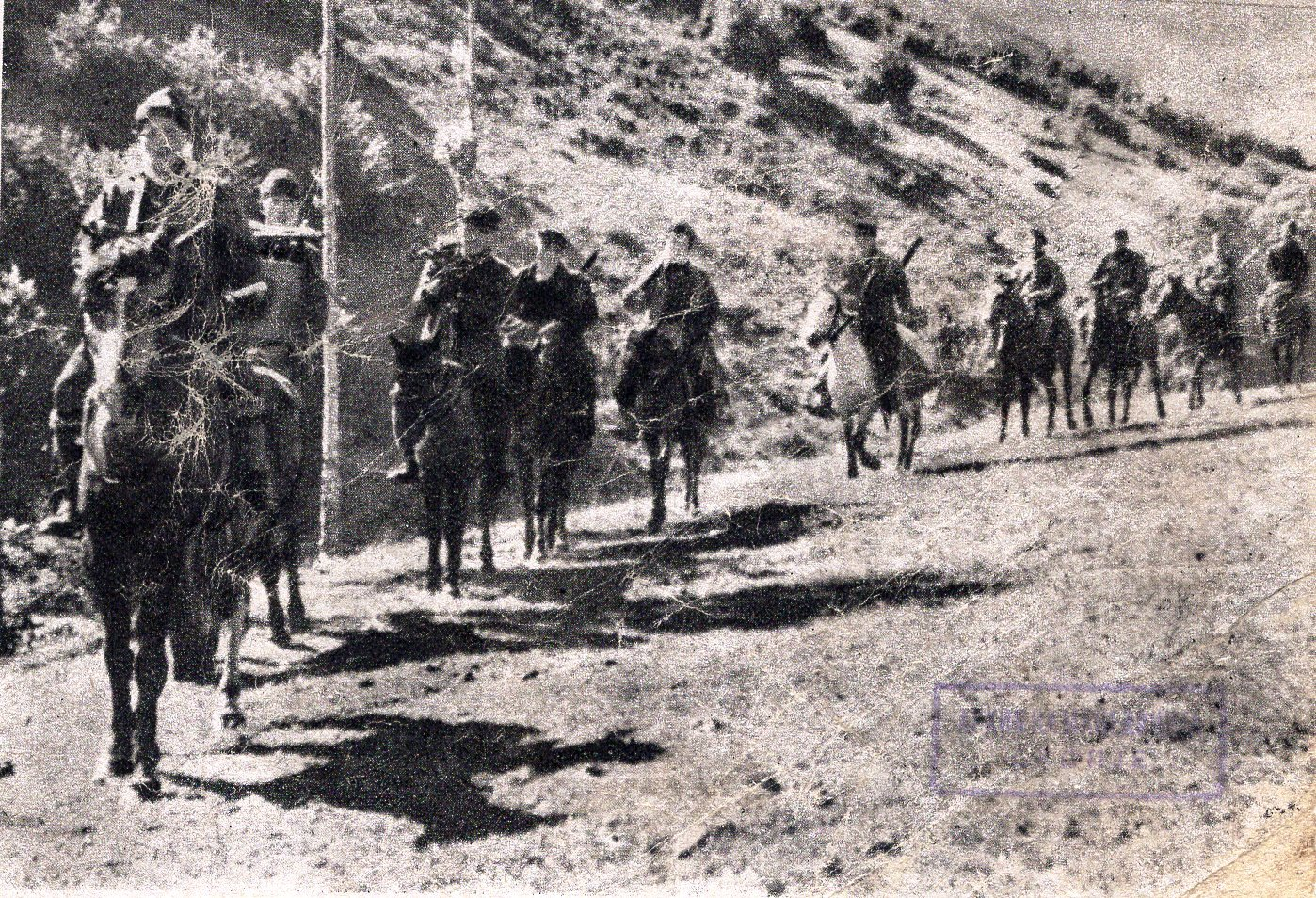
Greek Resistance cavalry during the Axis occupation

The Second Hellenic Republic was proclaimed in 1924 only to be disestablished in 1935 with the return of King George II of Greece. In August 1936, Prime Minister Metaxas, with the agreement of the king, suspended the parliament and established the quasi-fascist Metaxas regime.

Despite the country's numerically small and ill-equipped armed forces, Greece made a decisive contribution to the Allied efforts in World War II. At the start of the war, Greece sided with the Allies and refused to give in to Italian demands. Italy invaded Greece by way of Albania on 28 October 1940, but Greek troops repelled the invaders after a bitter struggle (see Greco-Italian War). This marked the first Allied victory in the war.

Primarily to secure his strategic southern flank, German dictator Adolf Hitler reluctantly stepped in and launched the Battle of Greece in April 1941. Axis units from Germany, Bulgaria, and Italy successfully invaded Greece, through Yugoslavia, forcing out the Greek defenders. The Greek government eventually decided to stop the fighting and thus stopped sending ammunition and supplies to the northern front and the defenders were easily overrun. The Greek government then proceeded, as the Nazi forces came towards the capital of Athens, to leave for Crete and then Cairo, Egypt.

On 20 May 1941, the Germans attempted to seize Crete with a large attack by paratroopers, with the aim of reducing the threat of a counter-offensive by Allied forces in Egypt, but faced heavy resistance. The Greek campaign might have delayed German military plans against the Soviet Union, and it is argued that had the German invasion of the Soviet Union started on 20 May 1941 instead of 22 June 1941, the Nazi assault against the Soviet Union might have succeeded. The heavy losses of German paratroopers led the Germans to launch no further large-scale air-invasions.

During the Axis occupation of Greece, thousands of Greeks died in direct combat, in concentration camps, or of starvation. The occupiers murdered the greater part of the Jewish community despite efforts by Christian Greeks to shelter the Jews. The economy was devastated, and the currency suffered one of the worst hyperinflations ever recorded.

When the Soviet Army began its drive across Romania in August 1944, the German Army in Greece began withdrawing north and northwestward from Greece into Yugoslavia and Albania to avoid being cut off in Greece. Hence, the German occupation of Greece ended in October 1944. The Resistance group ELAS seized control of Athens on 12 October 1944. British troops had already landed on 4 October in Patras, and entered Athens on 14 October 1944.

Christina Goulter summarizes the devastation done to Greece during the war:

"Between 1941 and 1945, over 8% of the Greek population had died; some 2000 villages and small towns had been razed to the ground; starvation was widespread due to the destruction of crops and worsened in many parts of Greece after liberation when agricultural labourers migrated to urban centres to escape politically inspired violence in the countryside; trade either internally or externally had all but ceased; most of Greece's merchant marine lay at the bottom of the sea; and motorized transport had been confiscated by the axis occupiers."

=== Greek Civil War (1944–1949) ===
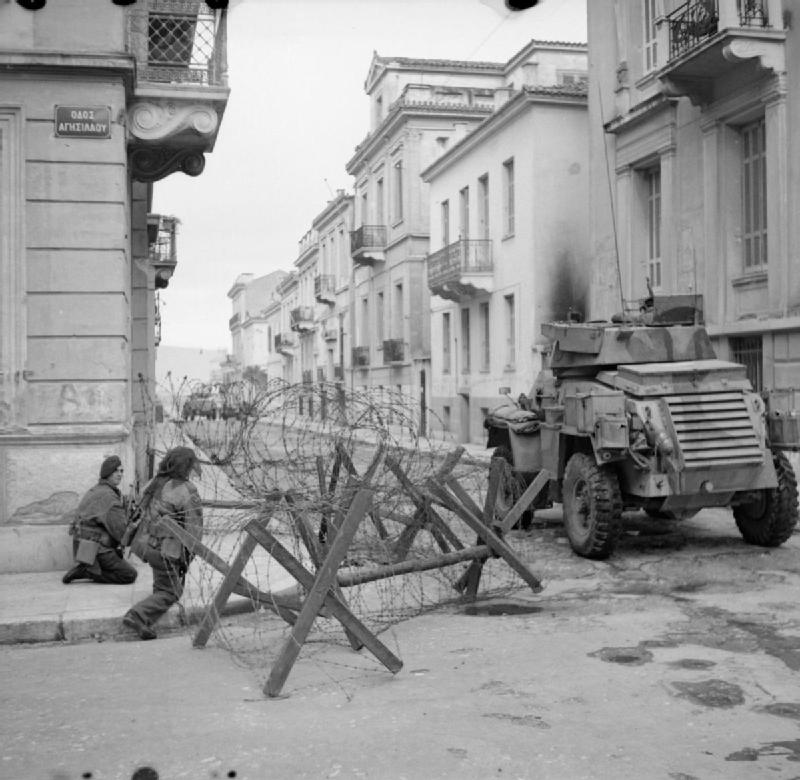
Clashes in Athens during the Dekemvriana events

The Greek Civil War (Greek: Eμφύλιος πόλεμος, romanized: Emfílios pólemos) was the first major confrontation of the Cold War. It was fought between 1944 and 1949 in Greece between the nationalist/non-Marxist forces of Greece (financially supported by the United Kingdom at first, and later by the United States) and the Democratic Army of Greece (ELAS), which was the military branch of the Communist Party of Greece (KKE).

Organization and military bases of the Communist led "Democratic Army", as well as entry routes to Greece.

The conflict resulted in a victory for the British — and later U.S.-supported government forces, which led to Greece receiving American funds through the Truman Doctrine and the Marshall Plan, as well as becoming a member of NATO, which helped to define the ideological balance of power in the Aegean for the entire Cold War.

The first phase of the civil war occurred in 1943–1944. Marxist and non-Marxist resistance groups fought each other in a fratricidal conflict to establish the leadership of the Greek resistance movement. In the second phase (December 1944), the ascendant communists, in military control of most of Greece, confronted the returning Greek government in exile, which had been formed under the auspices of the Western Allies in Cairo and originally included six KKE-affiliated ministers. In the third phase (called by some the "Third Round"), guerrilla forces controlled by the KKE fought against the internationally recognized Greek government which was formed after elections were boycotted by the KKE. Although the involvement of the KKE in the uprisings was universally known, the party remained legal until 1948, continuing to coordinate attacks from its Athens offices until proscription.

The war, which lasted from 1946 to 1949, was characterised by guerilla warfare between the KKE forces and Greek governmental forces mainly in the mountain ranges of northern Greece. The war ended with the NATO bombing of Mount Grammos and the final defeat of the KKE forces. The civil war left Greece with a legacy of political polarization. As a result, Greece also entered into an alliance with the United States and joined NATO, while relationships with its communist northern neighbours, both pro-Soviet and neutral, became strained.

=== Postwar development and integration in Western Bloc (1949–1967) ===
In the 1950s and 1960s, Greece developed rapidly, initially with the help of the Marshall Plan's grants and loans, also to decrease the communist influence. In 1952, by joining NATO, Greece clearly became part of the Western Bloc of the Cold War. But in Greek society, the deep divide between the leftist and rightist sections continued.

The Greek economy advanced further through growth in the tourism sector. New attention was given to women's rights, and in 1952 suffrage for women was guaranteed in the Constitution, full Constitutional equality following, and Lina Tsaldari becoming the first female minister that decade.

The Greek economic miracle is the period of sustained economic growth, generally from 1950 to 1973. During this period, the Greek economy grew by an average of 7.7%, second in the world only to Japan.

=== Military dictatorship (1967–1974) ===
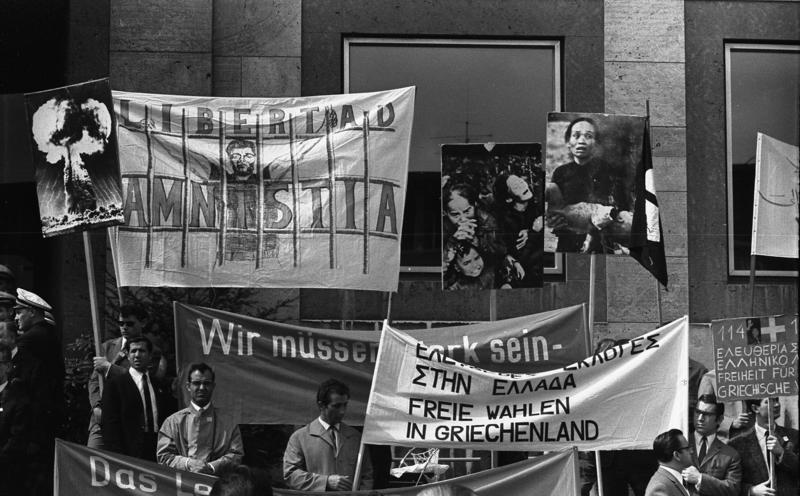
Protest against the junta by Greek political exiles in Germany, 1967

In 1967, the Greek military seized power in a coup d'état, overthrowing the centre right government of Panagiotis Kanellopoulos. It established the Greek military junta of 1967–1974 which became known as the Régime of the Colonels. The junta government's accession to power led to an isolation of Greece from European affairs and froze Greece's entry to the European Union. In 1973, the régime abolished the Greek monarchy and in 1974, dictator Papadopoulos denied help to the United States. After a second coup that year, Colonel Ioannides was appointed as the new head-of-state.

Ioannides was responsible for the 1974 coup against President Makarios of Cyprus. The coup became the pretext for the first wave of the Turkish invasion of Cyprus in 1974 (see Greco-Turkish relations). The Cyprus events and the outcry following a bloody suppression of Athens Polytechnic uprising in Athens led to the implosion of the military régime.

=== Third Hellenic Republic (1974 – present) ===
The fall of the junta was followed by the metapolitefsi, initiated when Konstantinos Karamanlis returned from self-exile in Paris at the invitation of the junta, to become interim prime minister on July 23, 1974. In August 1974, Greek forces withdrew from the integrated military structure of NATO in protest at the Turkish occupation of northern Cyprus. Karamanlis won the 1974 elections and put into question the monarchy through a referendum, in which Greeks voted 69%–31% to confirm the deposition of King Constantine II. Karamanlis then introduced a republican constitution that came into force. Later he gained re-election for another term as the head of the conservative New Democracy party. In 1980, he became President of Greece. Greece rejoined NATO in 1980, joined the European Union (EU) in 1981. After the restoration of democracy, Greece's stability and economic prosperity improved significantly. However, the Greek economy was facing pressure from the oil crises of the 1970s and from the increased competition by joining EU.

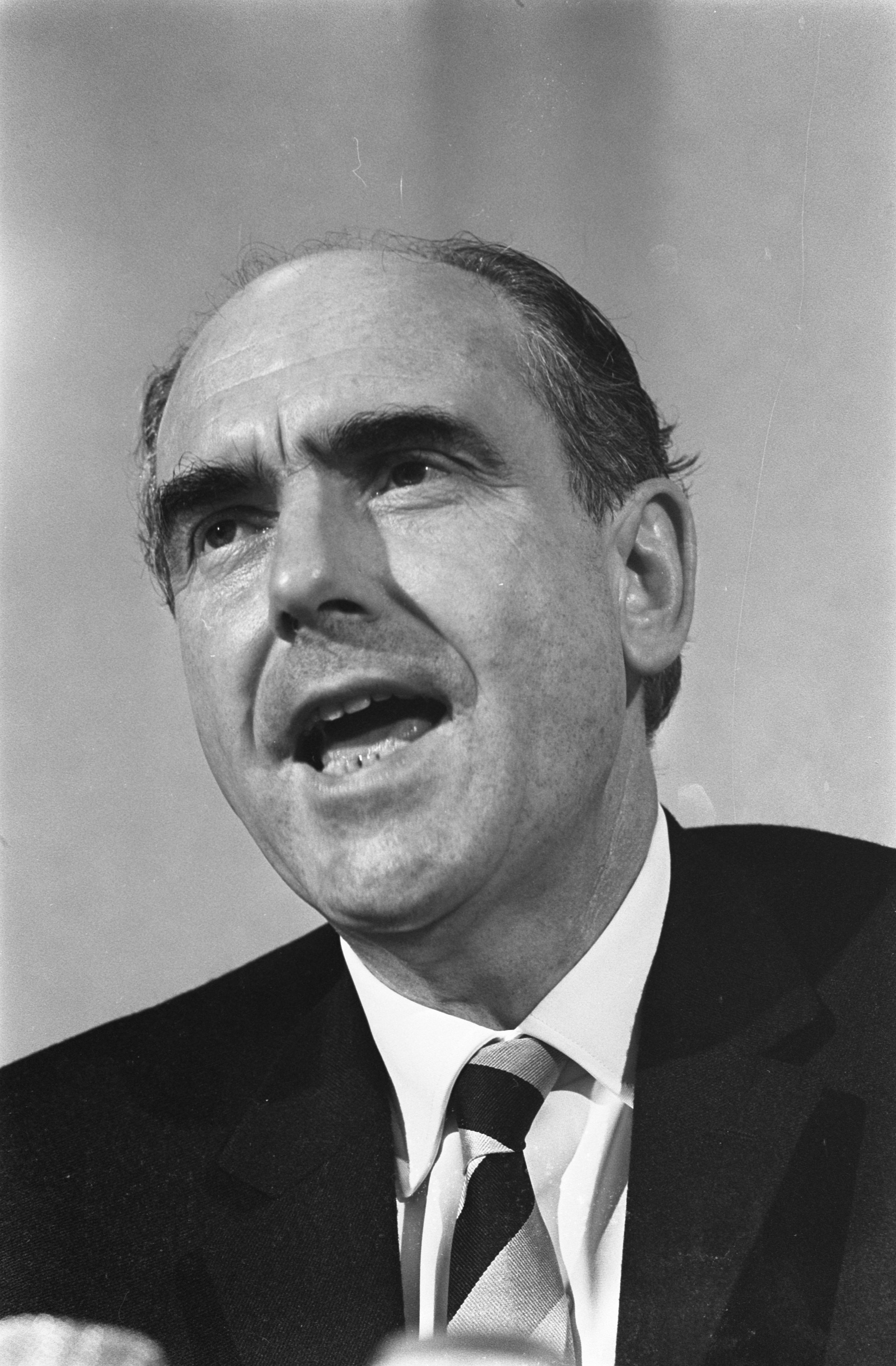
The socialist prime minister Andreas Papandreou

Another previously exiled politician, Andreas Papandreou also returned and founded the socialist PASOK Party (Panhellenic Socialist Movement), which won the 1981 election and dominated Greek politics for almost two decades. During his governorship, Papandreou implemented an ambitious program of social reforms, however, he made controversial foreign policy decisions that fueled the rise of terrorism in Greece, corruption became widespread (see Koskotas and Yugoslav corn scandals), and damaged the legitimacy of the constitution, while his economic policies failed to address Greece's economic problems.

Economic prosperity was restored after the austerity measures introduced by Konstantinos Mitsotakis toward meeting the Euro convergence criteria. These policies continued by Papandreou with his return to power in 1993. After Papandreou's death in 1996, his successor Costas Simitis put the economy in order with the completion of large-scale public works (e.g., Eleftherios Venizelos airport, the Athens Ring road, and Athens Metro) and Greece joined the Eurozone in 2001. Greece's reputation was also boosted by the successful 2004 Olympic Games in Athens.

New infrastructure funds from the EU and growing revenues from tourism, shipping, services, light industry and the telecommunications industry have brought Greeks an unprecedented standard of living. Tensions continue to exist between Greece and Turkey over Cyprus and the delimitation of borders in the Aegean Sea but relations have considerably thawed following successive earthquakes, first in Turkey and then in Greece, and an outpouring of sympathy and generous assistance by ordinary Greeks and Turks (see Earthquake Diplomacy).

==== Greece in the Eurozone ====
The 2008 global economic recession impacted Greece, as well as the rest of the countries in the eurozone. From late 2009, fears developed in investment markets of a sovereign debt crisis concerning Greece's ability to pay its debts, in view of the large increase in the country's government debt. This crisis of confidence was indicated by a widening of bond yield spreads and risk insurance on credit default swaps compared to other countries, most importantly Germany. Downgrading of Greek government debt to junk bond status created alarm in financial markets. On 2 May 2010, the Eurozone countries and the International Monetary Fund agreed on a €110 billion loan for Greece, conditional on the implementation of harsh austerity measures.

In October 2011, Eurozone leaders also agreed on a proposal to write off 50% of Greek debt owed to private creditors, increasing the European Financial Stability Facility amount to about €1 trillion, and requiring European banks to achieve 9% capitalization to reduce the risk of contagion to other countries. These austerity measures were extremely unpopular with the Greek public, precipitating demonstrations and civil unrest. This period corresponds to Greek government-debt crisis, that changed dramatically the political stage. Early in the period, PASOK were able to capitalise on a loss of support for ND. However, by the early 2010s, PASOK were also attracting blame for their handling of the crisis, and the radical party SYRIZA became the largest party on the left. The position of the far-right was also strengthened in this period.

SYRIZA has since overtaken PASOK as the main party of the centre-left.Alexis Tsipras led SYRIZA to victory in the general election held on 25 January 2015, falling short of an outright majority in Parliament by just two seats. The following morning, Tsipras reached an agreement with Independent Greeks party to form a coalition, and he was sworn in as Prime Minister of Greece. Tsipras called snap elections in August 2015, resigning from his post, which led to a month-long caretaker administration headed by judge Vassiliki Thanou-Christophilou, Greece's first female prime minister. In the September 2015 general election, Alexis Tsipras led SYRIZA to another victory, winning 145 out of 300 seats and re-forming the coalition with the Independent Greeks. However, he was defeated in the July 2019 general election by Kyriakos Mitsotakis who leads New Democracy. On 7 July 2019, Kyriakos Mitsotakis was sworn in as the new Prime Minister of Greece. He formed a centre-right government after the landslide victory of his New Democracy party.

In March 2020, Greece's parliament elected a non-partisan candidate, Katerina Sakellaropoulou, as the first female President of Greece. In June 2023, conservative New Democracy party won the legislative election, meaning another four-year term as prime minister for Kyriakos Mitsotakis.

In 2024, the Greek economy is forecast to grow nearly 3%, meaning it approaches its pre-crisis size of 2009 and far outpacing the euro zone average economic growth of 0.8%. On 31 August 2024, Greece declared a state of emergency in Volos after more than 100 metric tons of dead fish were recovered from the port of Volos. On 13 March 2025, Konstantinos Tasoulas was sworn in as Greece's new president.

== See also ==
- History of Crete
- History of Cyprus
- History of the Cyclades
- History of Thessaly
- History of Athens
- History of Macedonia
- History of Thrace
- History of the Greek language
- Timeline of Ancient Greece
- Timeline of modern Greek history
- Neolithic Greece
- Aegean civilization
- Cycladic culture
- Minoan civilization
- Mycenaean Greece
- Greek Dark Ages

Lists:

- List of ancient Greeks
- List of ancient Greek cities
- List of kings of Greece
- List of presidents of Greece
- List of prime ministers of Greece

General:

- History of the Balkans
- History of Asia Minor
- Intermediate Region
- History of Europe
