= Macedonian dialect =

Macedonian dialect may refer to:

- Dialects of Macedonian, the Eastern South Slavic language
- Ancient Macedonian language, usually classified as an ancient Greek dialect
- Varieties of Modern Greek, spoken in Greek Macedonia

== See also ==
- Macedonian Greek (disambiguation)
- Languages of Macedonia (disambiguation)
