= Slavic languages of Macedonia =

Slavic languages of Macedonia may refer to:

- Slavic languages of Macedonia (region), various Slavic languages (historical and modern) spoken in the geographical region of Macedonia (Old Slavic, Church Slavic, Macedonian, Bulgarian, Serbian)
- Slavic languages in Ottoman Macedonia, various Slavic languages and dialects spoken in the region of Macedonia during the Ottoman rule
- Slavic languages of Macedonia (Greece), various Slavic languages and dialects spoken in the Greek region of Macedonia
- Slavic languages of North Macedonia, various Slavic languages spoken in the Republic of North Macedonia (Macedonian, Bulgarian, Serbian)

== See also ==
- Languages of Macedonia (disambiguation)
- Macedonian language (disambiguation)
- Macedonia (disambiguation)
- Macedonian (disambiguation)
