= Macedonian art =

Macedonian art may refer to:

- Macedonian art (Byzantine), the period of Byzantine art, during the reign of Macedonian dynasty
- Art of Ancient Macedonia, the art of the ancient kingdom of Macedon and ancient Macedonians
- Greek art of Macedonia, Greece
- Art of North Macedonia, the art of North Macedonia, a country in southeastern Europe
  - Art of Macedonians (ethnic group), the art of Macedonians, a South Slavic ethnic group

== See also ==
- Macedonian culture (disambiguation)
- Macedonia (disambiguation)
- Macedonian (disambiguation)
