= Macedonian diaspora (disambiguation) =

The Macedonian diaspora consists of ethnic Macedonian emigrants and their descendants.

Macedonian diaspora may also refer to:

== In ethnic terms ==
- Greek Macedonian diaspora, diaspora of ethnic Greeks from the region of Macedonia

== In regional terms ==
- Macedonian regional diaspora, people of various ethnic backgrounds who originated from the region of Macedonia
- Diaspora of North Macedonia, people of various ethnic backgrounds who originated from North Macedonia

== See also ==
- Macedonia (disambiguation)
- Macedonian (disambiguation)
