= Macedonian Orthodox Church (disambiguation) =

The Macedonian Orthodox Church is an autocephalous Eastern Orthodox church in North Macedonia.

The term Macedonian Orthodox Church may also refer to:

- Archbishopric of Ohrid (1018–1767), a historical archbishopric
- Orthodox Ohrid Archbishopric, a now defunct autonomous archbishopric under the jurisdiction of the Serbian Orthodox Church
- Macedonian True Orthodox Church, a True Orthodox Church
- Metropolis of Thessaloniki, an Eastern Orthodox diocese in Greek Macedonia

== See also ==
- Archbishopric of Ohrid (disambiguation)
- Macedonia (disambiguation)
- Macedonian (disambiguation)
- Orthodox Church (disambiguation)
