= Religion in Macedonia =

The term Religion in Macedonia may refer to:

- Religion in Macedonia (region)
- Religion in Ancient Macedonia
- Religion in Macedonia (Greece)
- Religion in North Macedonia
- Religion in Pirin Macedonia (Bulgaria)

== See also ==
- Christianity in Macedonia (disambiguation)
- Culture of Macedonia (disambiguation)
- Macedonia (disambiguation)
- Macedonian (disambiguation)
