= Languages of Macedonia =

Languages of Macedonia may refer to:

- languages spoken in the geographical region of Macedonia
- Languages of Macedon, languages spoken in the ancient Greek kingdom of Macedon
- Languages of Macedonia (Greece), languages spoken in the Greek region of Macedonia
- Languages of North Macedonia, languages spoken in the Republic of North Macedonia

== See also ==
- Macedonia (disambiguation)
- Macedonian (disambiguation)
- Macedonian language (disambiguation)
- Slavic languages of Macedonia (disambiguation)
