= Christianity in Macedonia =

The term Christianity in Macedonia may refer to:

- Christianity in Macedonia (region)
- Christianity in Macedonia (Greece)
- Christianity in North Macedonia
- Christianity in Pirin Macedonia (Bulgaria)

== See also ==
- Religion in Macedonia (disambiguation)
- Macedonia (disambiguation)
- Macedonian (disambiguation)
