= Macedonian =

Macedonian may refer to someone or something from or related to Macedonia, in any of several meanings of that term. More specifically, it may refer to:

== People ==
=== Modern ===
- Macedonians (ethnic group), a South Slavic ethnic group and nation primarily associated with North Macedonia
- Macedonians (Greeks), ethnic Greeks inhabiting or originating from Greek Macedonia
- Macedonian Bulgarians, ethnic Bulgarians inhabiting or originating from the region of Macedonia

=== Medieval ===
- Macedonian dynasty, a line of rulers of the Byzantine Empire (867–1056)

=== Ancient ===
- Ancient Macedonians, the people of ancient Macedonia
- Pneumatomachi, also known as Macedonians, a 4th-century East Roman Christian sect

== Languages and dialects ==
=== Modern ===
- Macedonian language, an Eastern South Slavic language that is mainly spoken by ethnic Macedonians and is the primary language of North Macedonia
  - Dialects of Macedonian
- Macedonian dialect of Modern Greek, spoken in Greek Macedonia

=== Ancient ===
- Ancient Macedonian, spoken by the ancient Macedonians

== Other uses ==
- HMS Macedonian, a British frigate (1808–1812)
- USS Macedonian, the name of two ships in the United States Navy

== See also ==
- Macedonian (obsolete terminology)
- Macedon (disambiguation)
- Macedo-Romanians (disambiguation)
