= Raseia =

Raseia may refer to:

- Russia
- Ras and the Raška region, Serbia
- Rascia, an exonym for medieval Serbia and scarcely
- Rascians in the Pannonian Plain
