= Monk Simeon =

Serbian author

Monk Simeon is the Serbian author of Vukan's Gospel. This service Gospel -- aprakos—is the earliest manuscript illuminated in Raška between the end of the 12th-century (1196) and the beginning of the 13th-century (1202). It is believed that several scribes worked on the creation of the manuscript, however, a monk named Simon was identified as the leading scribe who proofread, edited and completed the work in a monastic cave near the residence of the župan at Stari Ras. Two miniatures in the Vukan Gospel exist, John the Evangelist and Christ Emmanuel, showing Byzantine art influence.

== See also ==
- Anonymous Zećanin of the 11th century
- Saint Sava
- Medieval Serbian literature
