= Vukan Gospel =

12th-century Serbian manuscript

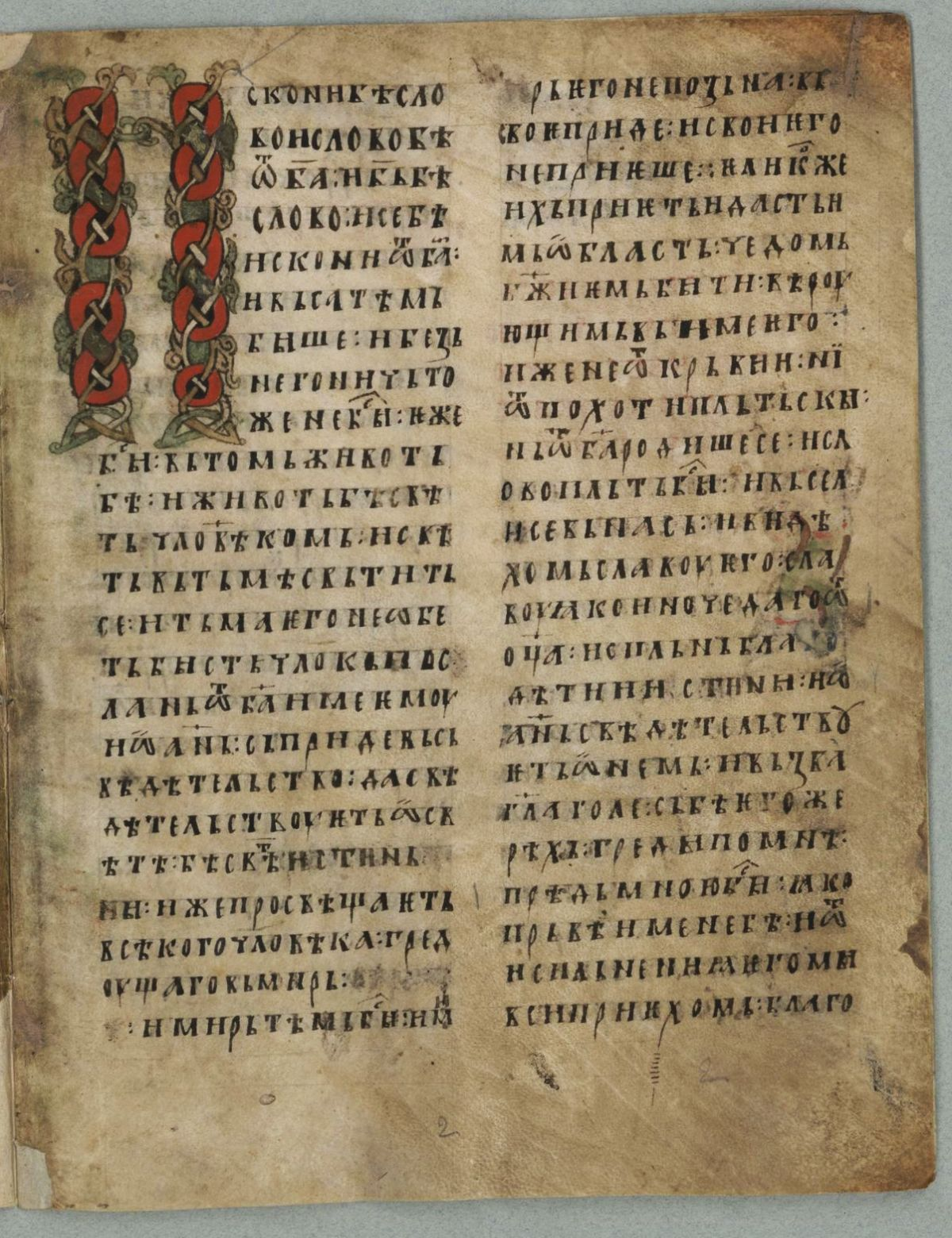
- A folio of the Gospel
- Created: 1200
- Author: Monk Simeon

Vukan Gospel (Serbian: Вуканово јеванђеље, romanized: Vukanovo jevanđelje) is a 13th-century illuminated manuscript (Gospel Book), written in Serbian recension of Church Slavonic language and the Cyrillic script. It is one of the oldest preserved Serbian medieval books, with more than 189 pages.

It was produced in Ras, which was the capital of the Grand Principality of Serbia, by the monk Simeon for the grand prince Vukan, the son of grand prince Stefan Nemanja. It is the oldest aprakos written in medieval Serbia.

Miniatures in Vukan Gospel from the beginning of the 13th century, are representative of the regional Raška miniature style. They were executed in the spirit of the late Komnenian art, characterized by graphic interpretations. The old monk Symeon left a long note saying that the manuscript had been made at the city of Ras, for the grand prince (veliki župan) Vukan Nemanjić. It is quite possible that Simeon was the author of the miniatures.

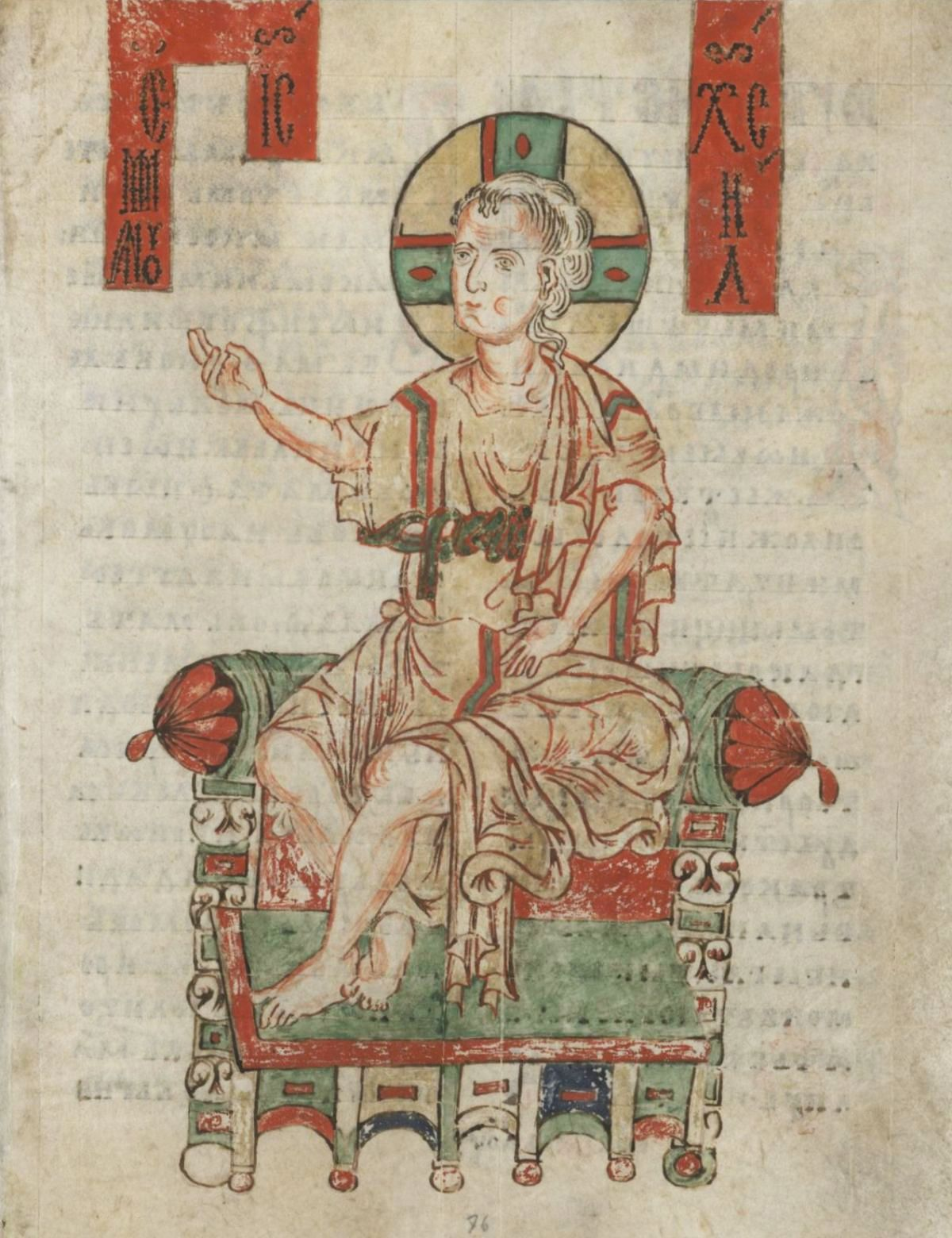
Miniature of the manuscript depicting Jesus Emmanuel

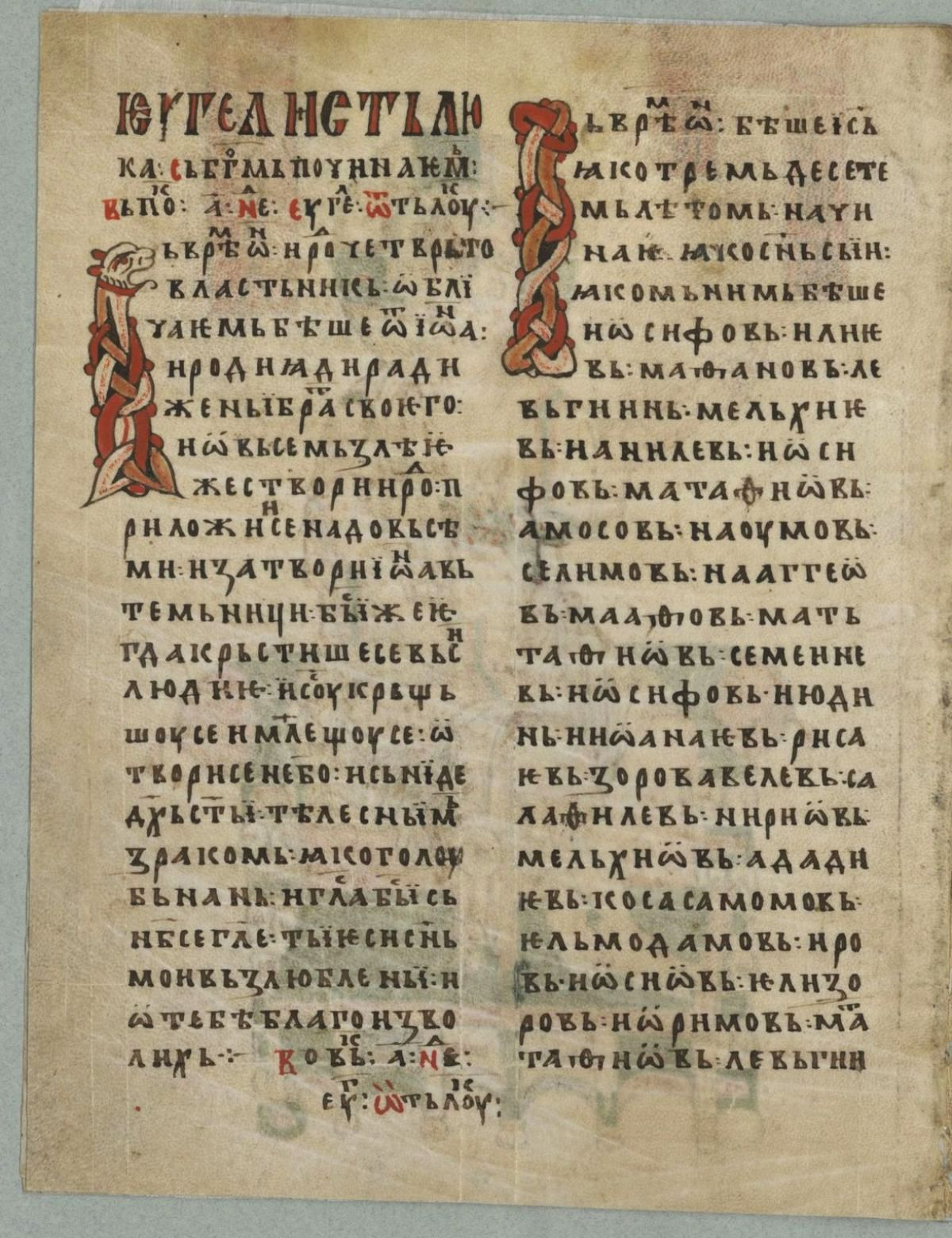
other folio

== See also ==
- Medieval Serbian literature
- List of Serbian manuscripts
- Illuminated manuscripts

== Sources ==
- Ćirković, Sima (2004). The Serbs. Malden: Blackwell Publishing.
- Curta, Florin (2006). Southeastern Europe in the Middle Ages, 500–1250. Cambridge: Cambridge University Press.
- Curta, Florin (2019). Eastern Europe in the Middle Ages (500-1300). Leiden and Boston: Brill.
- Fine, John Van Antwerp Jr. (1994) [1987]. The Late Medieval Balkans: A Critical Survey from the Late Twelfth Century to the Ottoman Conquest. Ann Arbor: University of Michigan Press.
- Ivić, Pavle, ed. (1995). The History of Serbian Culture. Edgware: Porthill Publishers.
- Janićijević, Jovan, ed. (1998). The Cultural Treasury of Serbia. Belgrade: Idea, Vojnoizdavački zavod, Markt system.
