= Byzantine Macedonia =

Byzantine Macedonia may refer to:

- Diocese of Macedonia, a diocese of the Eastern Roman Empire
- Byzantine period in the history of medieval Macedonia (region)
- Macedonia (theme), a distinctive administrative unit of the Byzantine Empire
- Thessalonica (theme), a distinctive administrative unit of the Byzantine Empire

== See also ==
- Macedonia (disambiguation)
- Ottoman Macedonia (disambiguation)
- Eastern Macedonia (disambiguation)
- Western Macedonia (disambiguation)
- North Macedonia
