= Stari Ras =

Archaeological site in Serbia

- Стари Рас (Serbian)
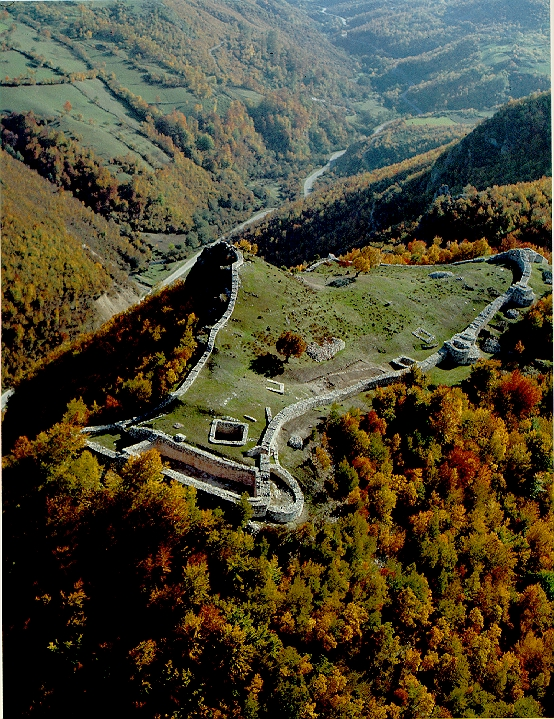
- Overview of Stari Ras (Gradina-Pazarište)

- Location of Stari Ras within Serbia
- 43°7′42″N 20°24′56″E
- Location: Near Novi Pazar, Serbia

Site notes
- Elevation: 755 m (2,477.0 ft)

UNESCO World Heritage Site
- Type: Cultural
- Criteria: i, iii
- Designated: 1979 (3rd session)
- Part of: Stari Ras and Sopoćani
- Reference no.: 96
- Region: Europe and North America

Cultural Heritage of Serbia
- Official name: Srednjovekovni grad Ras
- Type: Monument of Culture of Exceptional Importance
- Designated: 22 August 1947
- Reference no.: SK 534

Ras (Serbian: Рас; Latin: Arsa), known in modern Serbian historiography as Stari Ras (Стари Рас, "Old Ras"), was a medieval fortress complex located in the vicinity of former marketplace of Staro Trgovište, some 10–11 kilometers (6.2–6.8 mi) west of modern-day city of Novi Pazar in southwestern Serbia. Old Ras was part of the Eastern Roman Empire and was then a frontier fortress that switched hands between the First Bulgarian Empire and the Byzantine Empire, in the end becoming one of the first and main capitals of the medieval Serbian state. Located in today's region of Raška, its favorable position on the crossroads and trading routes between neighbouring regions added to its importance as a city.

Two fortifications (gradina) exist around the site, Gradina-Pazarište and Gradina-Postenje, while the urban place Staro Trgovište below Gradina-Pazarište developed since the late medieval period and influenced the foundation of Novi Pazar eastward during the Ottoman period. There are plans for future reconstruction of the site. In the close vicinity, there is an impressive group of medieval monuments, including churches and monasteries, such as Church of Saint Apostles Peter and Paul and the Sopoćani Monastery. The site of Stari Ras, in combination with nearby Sopoćani, is a UNESCO World Heritage Site.

== Etymology ==
The toponym Ras in Slavic form derives from pre-Slavic Arsa via metathesis. It is considered that it derives from a hydronym, the eponymous river Raška. The Slavic form Rasa is used by Constantine Porphyrogenitos in the 10th century. The oldest mention of the fortress of Ras is from c. 1127, while the oldest and only mention of the city of Ras in the native Serbian sources is from 1200, but as a toponym the region/župa of Ras is widely found. A 1186 charter is the first attested use of the term Raška (Latin: Rascia) as a designation for the Serbian state, but in the sources would still be used alongside Serbia (even simultaneously as "of Serbia and Rascia"). Raška/Rascia was mainly used a synonym for the Kingdom of Serbia (1217–1346).

The 14th-century semi-mythical Chronicle of the Priest of Duklja (LPD) anachronistically projects the events of Serbian early history before the 12th century also in the region called Raška (Rassa, Rassam, Rassae, Rasse), but identified it with all Serbian territory east of river Drina. From the 12th century onwards exist realistic topographic description of the surroundings of the Church of St. Peter (Caldanae is Novopazarska Banja; Bello is Podbijelje; the town could be identified with near fort Gradina-Postenje). Gradina-Pazarište is deemed the capital with the main fortress, and Gradina-Postenje as the fort closer to the bishopric church of St. Peter.

== History ==
=== Early Middle Ages ===
Archaeological findings of fortified structures and early churches from the area of Stari Ras, dated from fourth to the sixth century, correspond to the testimony of Byzantine historian Procopius who wrote that the Roman castellum of Arsa in the province of Dardania was refortified during the reign of the emperor Justinian I (r. 527–565).

There exists two fortifications (gradina), Gradina-Postenje (also known as "Ras-Postenje") and Gradina-Pazarište in the Ras area. Throughout history their development was interconnected and probably made a uniform defensive system. In the 3rd century AD of the Roman period it was on a crossroad, with mining fields nearby, and military settlement. The wider area was seemingly spared from the late 4th–5th century migration period invasions. In the 6th century, some Germanic barbarian remains were found, along with material associated with the Frankish Merovingian dynasty. In c. 518, the area of Ras was hit by a devastating earthquake which caused much damage in the Roman province of Dardania. The Central Balkans was attacked by Avars and settled more intensely by Slavs in the first quarter of the 7th century. Both gradina were damaged and abandoned at the beginning of the 7th century.

The 10th century De Administrando Imperio (DAI) mentions that Boris (r. 852–889) was escorted by the sons of Serbian ruler Mutimir as far as the frontier at Ras, usually dated around 880. Ras was not among the mentioned kastra (inhabited towns) of Serbia, nor specified on which side of the border it was located, so in the scholarship there's no consensus whether Ras was located on the Serbian, or Bulgarian side of the border, and whether it referred to a town or an area. Newer research indicates that in the mid-9th century and in the 10th century, Ras was a western frontier district of Bulgaria towards Serbia. The Bulgars used the fortifications of Ras-Postenje and Ras-Pazarište to prevent the Serbs from retaking territory (to the east) that they had inhabited in the 7th century. The lack of material of Bulgar origin in Vrsjenice (assumed to be Serbian city Destinikon), indicates that the border was at the Pešter plateau. Byzantine Emperor John Tzimiskes re-established control of Ras in 971 and established the Catepanate of Ras; the seal of protospatharios and katepano John of Ras (Greek: tou Rasou) has been found from that era. By 976, the Bulgarian state had regained Ras, and according to LPD it was the Serbs who defeated the Byzantines. At the end of the 10th century, the Podgrađe site shows that the locality was burnt down and abandoned. The site was abandoned and without Byzantine military-strategical importance until the end of the 11th century when it was made into a strong military base.

=== High Middle Ages ===
Basil II recaptured Ras in 1016–1018, and the region became part of the thema of Serbia. The imperial charter of Basil II from 1020 to the Archbishopric of Ohrid, in which the rights and jurisdictions were established, mentions the Episcopy of Ras as one of the bishoprics, that belonged to the Bulgarian autocephal church during the time of Peter I (927–969) and Samuel of Bulgaria (977–1014). It is considered that it was possibly founded by the Bulgarian emperor, or it is the latest date at which it could have been integrated to the Bulgarian Church. If it previously existed, it probably was part of the Bulgarian metropolis of Morava, but certainly not of Dyrrhachium. If it was on Serbian territory, it seems that the Church in Serbia or part of the territory of Serbia became linked and influenced by the Bulgarian Church between 870 and 924.

In 1032, the overall commander of the region was strategoi and doukes Constantine Diogenes, and Ras was part of a defensive line of Byzantine watchtowers alongside Lipjan, Zvečan, Galič, Jeleč south of Ras and Brvenik north of Ras, watching to the west over a "no-man's-land" named Zygos mountains, beyond which was Serbia. Ras was defensively upgraded at the end of the 11th century. It is unclear whether Ras came under Serbian rule in the late 11th century. Recent archaeological research supports the notion that the Byzantines held control of Ras during Alexios I Komnenos's reign (1081–1118), but possibly not continuously. A seal of Alexios dated to 1081–1092 was found in 2018 near the site. It seems that the watchtowers commanders' skirmishes into the Serbian eastern frontiers provoked Vukan, Grand Prince of Serbia in the early 1090s to counterattack and to conquer the border fortresses in the Byzantine–Serbian War (1090–1095), but although John Doukas regained most of them, in 1093 Vukan "ravaged the neighbouring towns and districts. He even got as far as Lipjan, which he deliberately burnt down", but when Alexios came close, Vukan escaped to Zvečan and started peace negotiations. The found seals of commanders Nikolaos Synesios, Eustathios Kamytzes and Constantine Dalassenos perhaps dates to campaigns against Vukan. In the 1120s, the fortress of Ras was again burnt and destroyed by the Serbs, a "Dalmatian nation". Its commander Kritoplos was punished by the Emperor for the fall of the fortress. It remained a Byzantine frontier area until John II Komnenos lost the area to the Serbs as a result of the Byzantine–Hungarian War (1127–1129).

The Byzantines rebuilt the fortress by 1143. It was retaken by Uroš II (r. 1145–1161) with the aim of distracting the Byzantines from engaging with Roger II of Sicily. The Serbian Uprising of 1149 caused Byzantine emperor Manuel I Komnenos to penetrate "Dalmatia", destroying the Ras fortress and devastate everything along the way, "the countless multitudes that he made slaves, he left there with the army of sebastohypertatos Constantine Angelos". He continued into Nikava, conquering all the forts with ease. After storming the nearby Galič, whose inhabitants were partly warriors and herdsmen who took away and settled in Serdika and other Roman regions, and "having learned from Angelos that the Župan, waiting for an opportune moment after his departure from there began to attack the Romans and that a fight had already taken place, set out as fast as he could from there to capture him. But this one, hearing that the Romans were coming, fled over the mountain passes and escaped the danger on foot. The emperor headed through the country, since there was no one to stop him at all, devastated it, and after burning the buildings there intended for the archizoupanos as the ruling centre, left". The following year, they continued to successfully fight off the Serbians and Hungarians, ending with the Battle of Tara (1150). Somewhere in the second half of the 12th century, Ras would have been finally conquered and controlled by the Serbs, who greatly renovated it, and made it to a centre of defence and royal residency. Stefan Nemanja, who previously received the Byzantine land of Dendra west of Niš, usurped the Serbian throne and expanded his territories in the late 1160s. In celebration, Nemanja erected the monastery of Đurđevi stupovi, with an inscription showing that the end of the construction was in 1170-1171. The city of Ras was not yet a capital in the general sense but the wider area of Raška with various fortifications, as there's no evidence of urbanization until the 14th century. In 1188, Nemanja showed intention to make Niš the centre of the state, and there was also a royal court in Kotor. Byzantine intervention continued until the end of the 12th century and the Serb feudal rulers of the region were often under Byzantine suzerainty. The full independence of Serbia including the region of Raška was recognized by the Byzantines in 1190 after an indecisive win by Isaac II Angelos over Nemanja. Nemanja's son Stefan, who eventually was elevated to king, acceded the Serbian throne at Ras. Its favorable position in the area known as Old Serbia, along the Raška gorge at Pešter plateau, on the crossroads and trading routes between neighbouring regions of Zeta and Bosnia in the west and Kosovo in the south, added to its importance as a city.

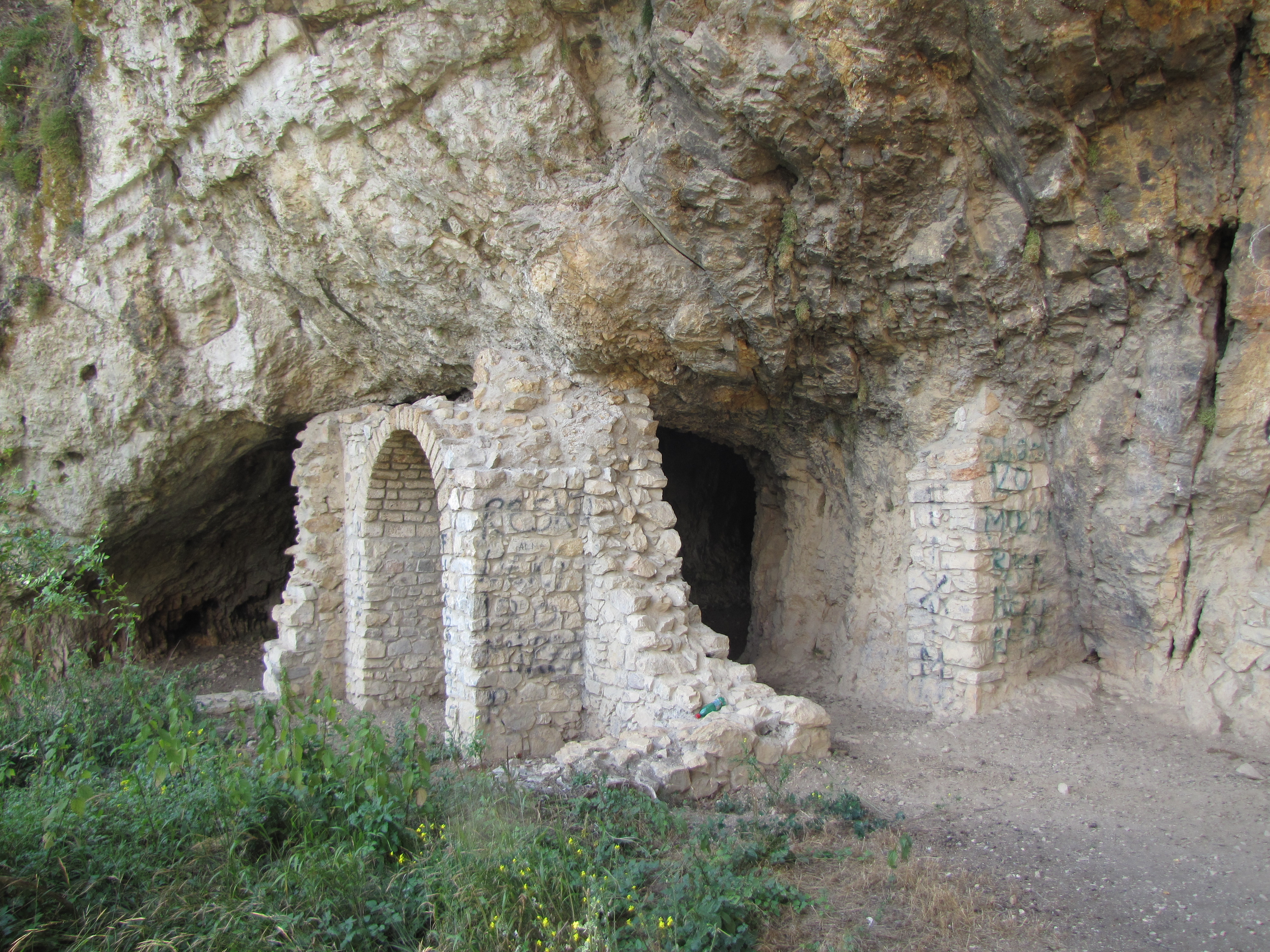
The cave monastery of Archangel Michael, active in the 12th–13th century.

The cave monastery of St. Michael (where Monk Simeon was later active and wrote Vukan's Gospel dated to c. 1202) was constructed beneath the Podgrađe of the Gradina-Pazarište on a rocky cliff of the hill. In 1196 Nemanja held an assembly in Ras. In the 1230s a Serbian mint was located there, possibly also the royal treasury. A big granary was also found. Somewhere in the early 13th century, it became damaged amid civil war, but extensively renovated again by the time of the second Serbian king Stefan Radoslav (1228–1233). However, there is not much archaeological evidence that it was burnt and became desolated around the 1230s, probably being the scene of noble battles in which Radoslav lost and Stefan Vladislav (1234–1243) came to the throne. Seemingly it was not well renovated again, and from that point in time gradually lost its status as the Serbian state "capital", but until then the Serbian's state name became closely associated with the name of Rascia, and Serbian people with the Rasciani. The final desolation happened in the early 14th century during the reign of Stefan Milutin (1282–1321).

=== Late Middle Ages ===
During the 14th century, there was an important marketplace below the Stari Ras, Trgovište, that started to develop. The scholarly thesis of Novi Pazar being a continuation of Stari Ras by identifying it with Ras-Trgovište has by now been rejected. By the mid-15th century, in the time of the final Ottoman conquest of the region, another marketplace was developing to the east. The older place was known as Staro Trgovište ("old marketplace", Turkish: Eski Pazar) and younger as Novo Trgovište ("new marketplace", Turkish: Yeni Pazar). The latter developed into the modern city of Novi Pazar, and there is no medieval archaeological site found in the centre of Novi Pazar. In the Ottoman administrative division, Ras in 1455 was part of the vilayet of Skopje, by 1463 the nahiye of Ras existed within the vilayet of Jeleč (a fort 12 km south of Novi Pazar), and in 1475 Novi Pazar was founded, which soon became its centre (although Novi Pazar itself should not be considered as a continuity of Ras). The toponym of Ras vanished in the 18th century, influenced by the First of Great Migrations of the Serbs in the end of the 17th century.

== Cultural Heritage ==
Stari Ras and the Sopoćani monastery were inscribed on the UNESCO World Heritage List in 1979. The combined site also includes Peter's Church and Đurđevi stupovi. Stari Ras was declared a Monument of Culture of Exceptional Importance in 1990, and it is protected by the Republic of Serbia.

There exists two fortifications (gradina), Gradina-Postenje (also known as "Ras-Postenje") and Gradina-Pazarište in the Ras area. Throughout history their development was interconnected and probably made a uniform defensive system.

Archaeological sondage sampling of the Stari Ras area began in 1975 by a team of historians and archaeologists. The medieval city of Ras was likely at Gradina-Postenje, as per archaeological findings, although it might have also been at Gradina-Trgovište.

=== Archaeological sites ===
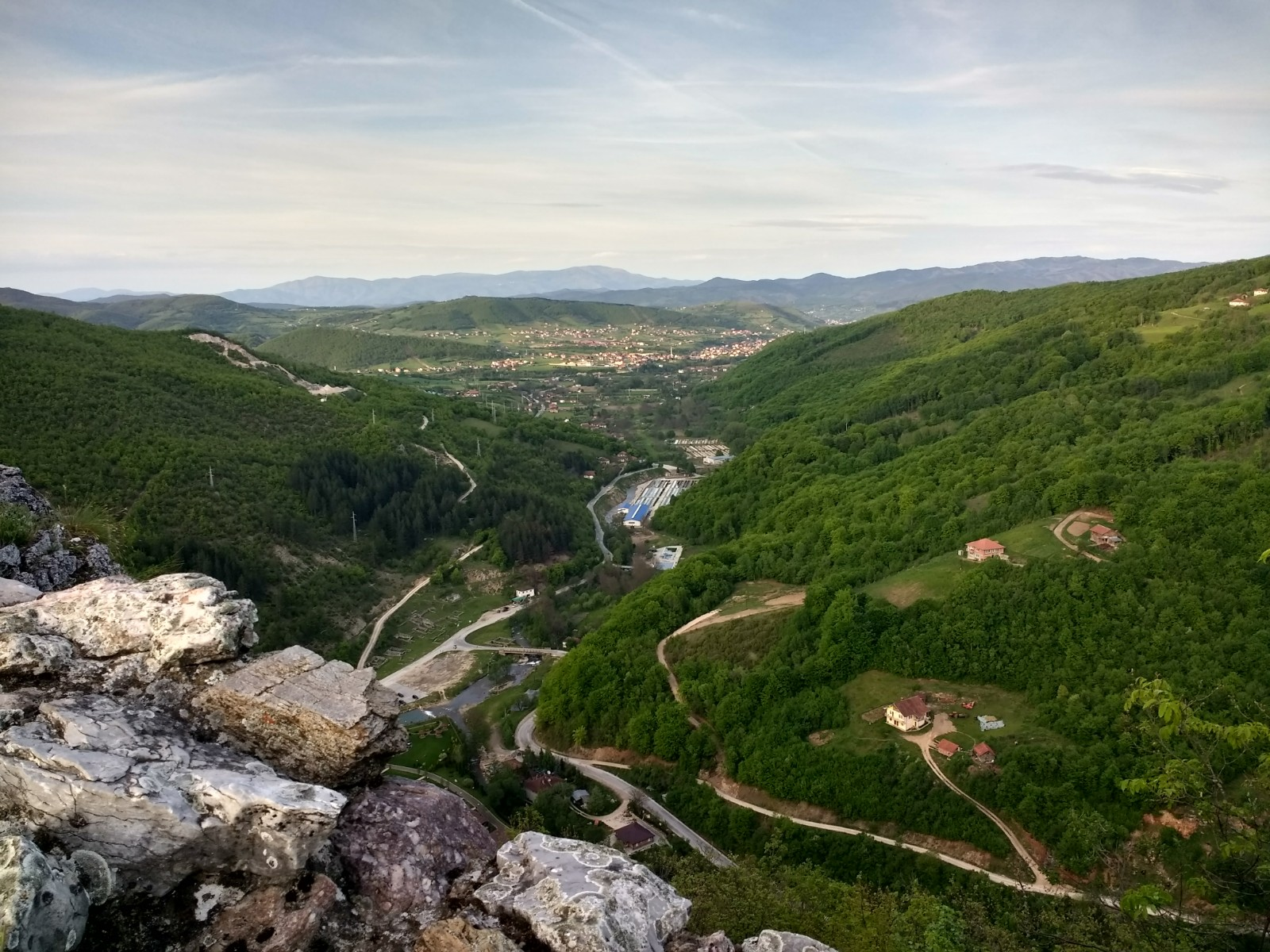
View from Gradina-Pazarište to the northeast.

==== Gradina-Pazarište, Podgrađe ====
The Ras Fortress (Рас) or Gradina-Pazarište, is an archaeological complex including the sites of Gradina at a plateau of the Pazarište hill and Podgrađe situated at the eastern slopes of the Gradina. It was archaeologically surveyed between 1975 and 1991 with interruptions. There are several layers at the site, including a prehistoric settlement (Early Bronze Age, and 7th–6th century BC), Antique speculum (second half of 3rd century AD), Early Byzantine fortification (older, 4th–5th century, younger, 6th century), Early Medieval fortification (mid-9th to 11th century), Medieval Fortress (of three periods, stretching from end of 11th to the 13th century).

The prehistoric settlement includes ceramics part of the Hallstatt horizon (800–500 BC) of the Glasinac culture IV and V, as well as northern Greek imports dated to the 7th–6th century BC, and sporadic finds in the Basarabi culture style. Metalwork is very scarce, with small findings amounting to Scythian horse headgear found in the Carpathian basin and Pannonia. The Early Iron Age layer has scarce findings, existing for the 6th century BC, but shows that there was a wider settlement. Velika gradina is a small site some 500 meters south of Pazarište, with scarce prehistoric Hallstatt-era ceramic finds, perhaps being a sentry point of the Podgrađe prehistoric settlement. The Gradina-Pazarište complex, and the wider area of the Raška spring, was abandoned after the beginning of the 5th century BC, and was uninhabited for more than eight centuries. Antique object finds are scarce, and only found at Podgrađe, except Roman coins at Gradina, showing that a resettlement happened in the second half of the 3rd century AD. "House 17" dates to the 4th century and "Tower VII" was built as an independent watchtower (speculum) in the 3rd–4th century transition, only temporarily used. The remains of medieval architecture, from the mid-9th to 1240s, is best preserved.

==== Trgovište ====
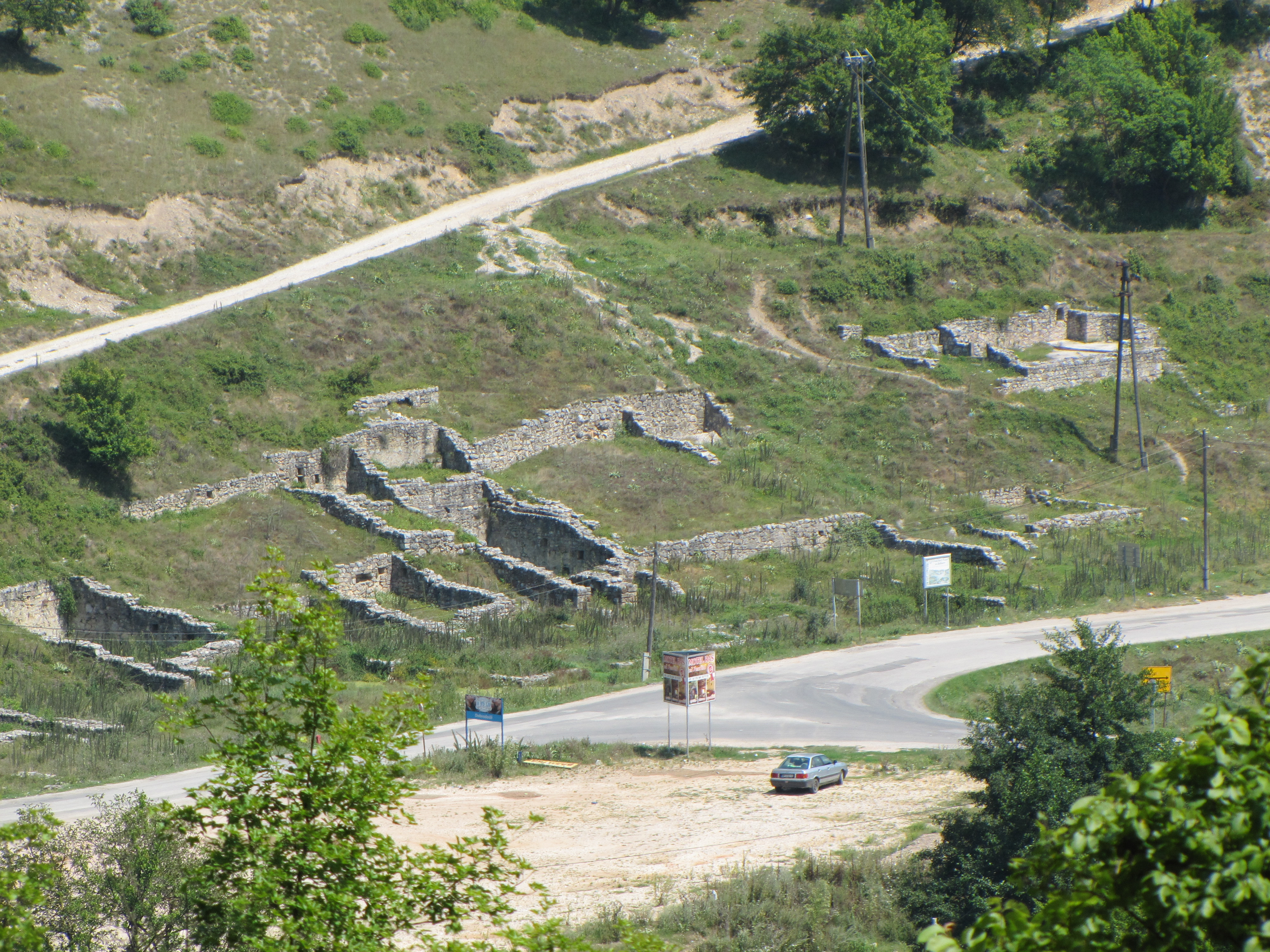
Remains of Trgovište.

Trgovište is located below Gradina-Pazarište, directly across the Raška river, by the Raška–Sebečevska confluence. It includes remains of urban settlement dating to 14–17th centuries, with older grave findings. An urn dating to the 8th century BC was found here.

==== Reljina gradina ====
Reljina gradina in Lukocrevo, some 2 km east of Pazarište, could be functionally connected to Pazarište. It has the remains of the Monastery of St. Barbara, where the metropolitans of Raška were seated in the 16th–17th centuries.

==== Gradina-Postenje ====
Excavations at Postenje began in 1982–1984 with findings of the Early Iron Age, Late Antique, Justinian and Komnenoi periods.

In the second half of the 9th century and in the 10th century, the Postenje fortification was renovated and the former settlement partly reused. The type of ceramics used in the renovation was imported from either the Black Sea coast or Macedonia. Some of the urns with inscribed runes have similarities with findings in Bulgaria, and overall are in line with the Bulgarian state expansion. Other ceramic findings do not have cognates in central or eastern Balkans (Bulgaria). The decorated bronze findings at the Podgrađe site are of the general nomadic type, with similarities to Bulgar Turkic and Magyar findings.

=== Other sites ===
In the region of Raška also existed other ancient church buildings, a basilica in village Pope north of Pazarište and a church within Novi Pazar/Novopazarska Banja borders (both outside fortifications), and churches in Gradina-Postenje and Zlatni Kamen (both within fortifications). Such concentration could indicate the existence of an ancient episcopy (with a seat at a basilica near Pazarište), possibly connected to the ancient Bishopric of Ulpiana. The oldest early medieval church-building in Serbia, the Church of the Holy Apostles Peter and Paul (also known as St. Peter's Church), was founded near Novi Pazar, sometime during the 9th century. Its commonly considered to have been built on the 6th century Byzantine foundations.

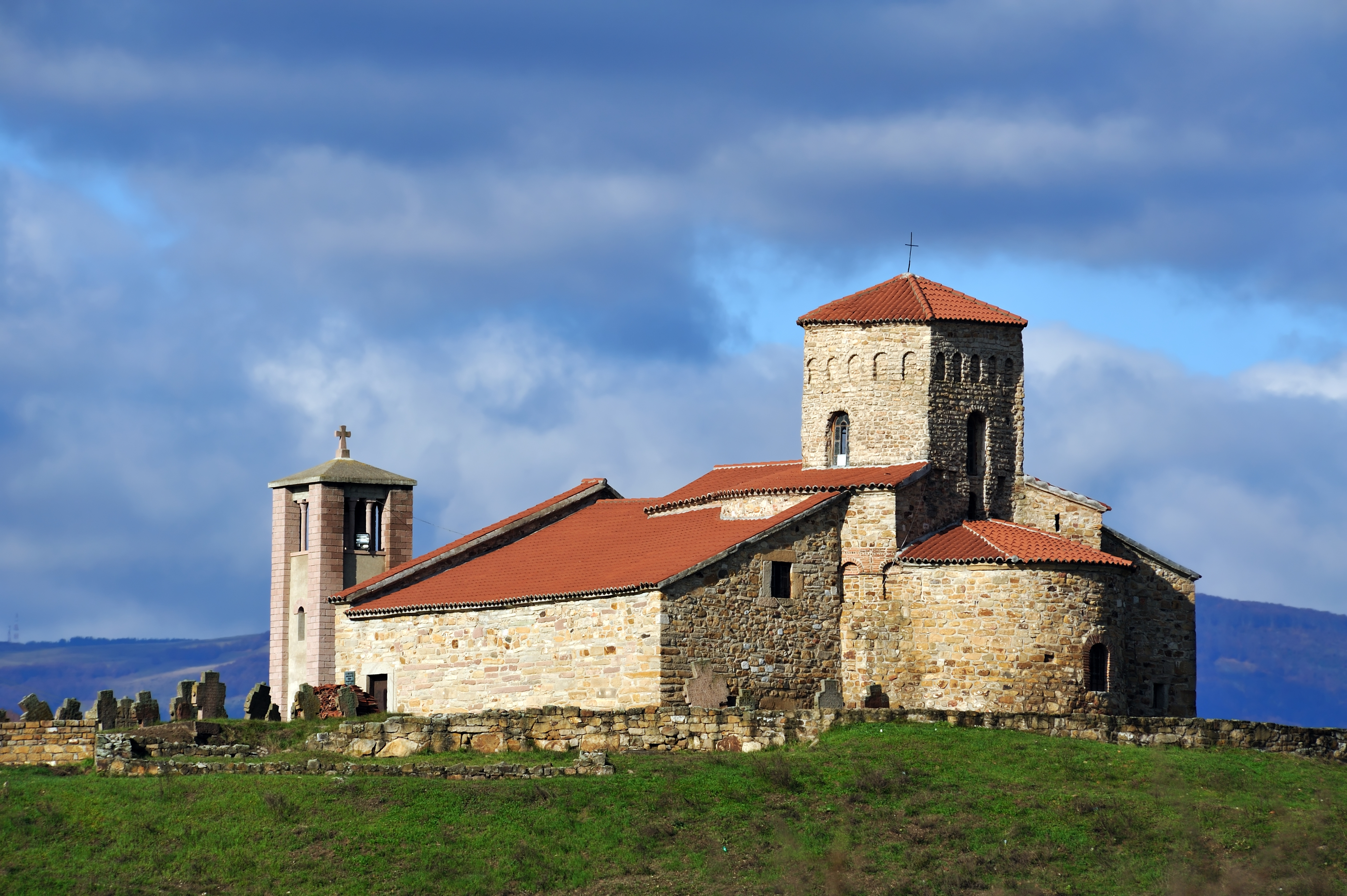
Church of the Holy Apostles Peter and Paul

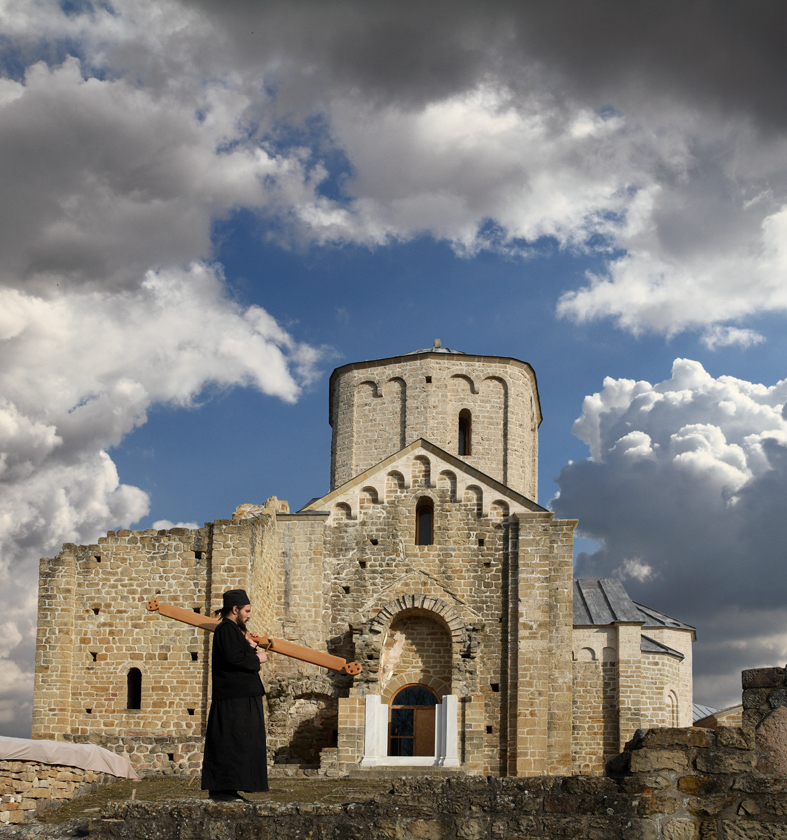
Đurđevi stupovi, 12th century

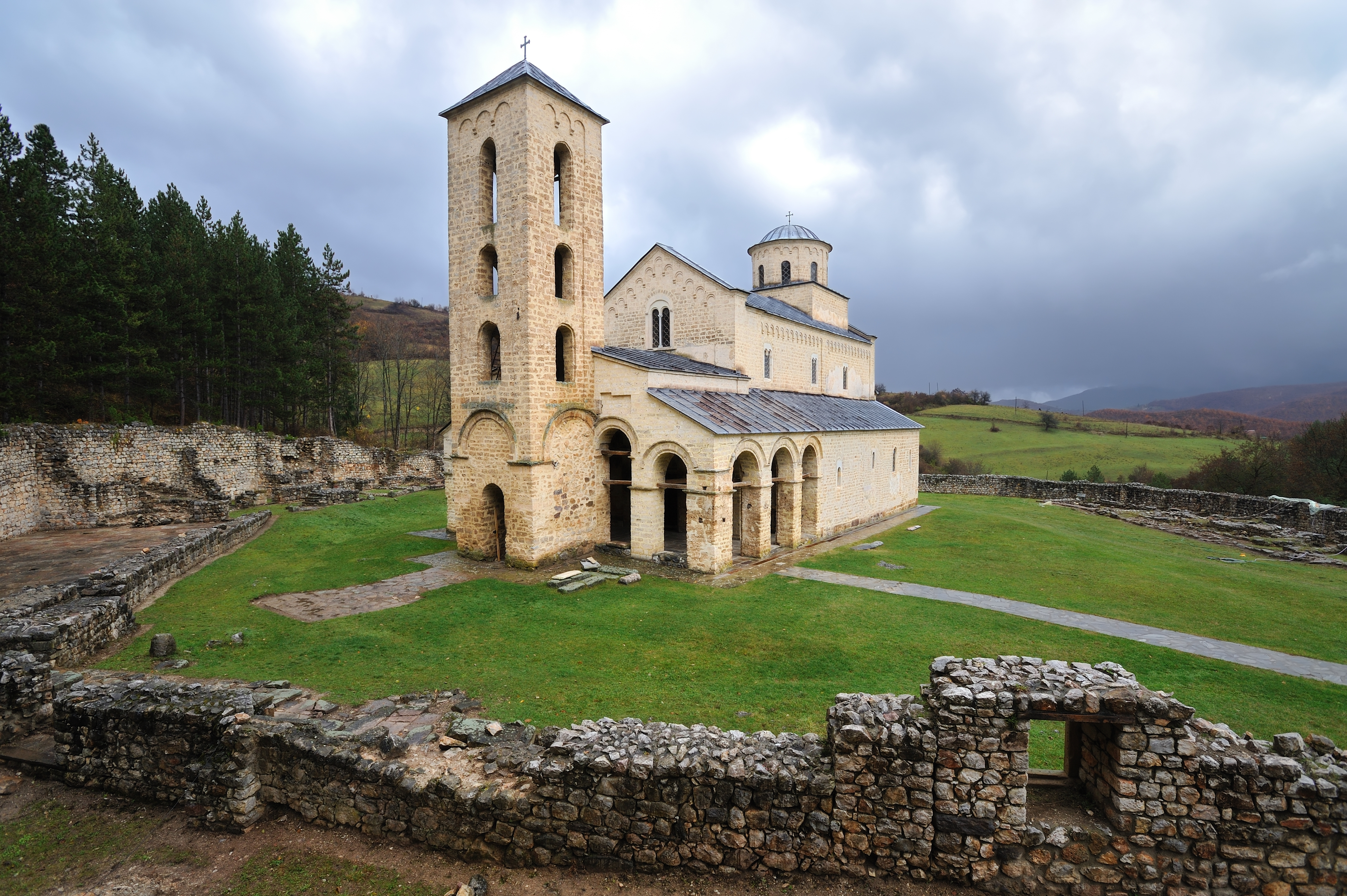
Sopoćani, 13th century

== See also ==
- Monument of Culture of Exceptional Importance
- Tourism in Serbia
- Nemanjić dynasty
- Spatial Cultural-Historical Units of Great Importance
