= Synesios (commander) =

Byzantine commander

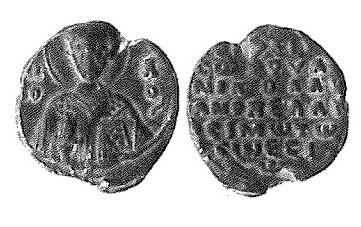
- Seal of Synesios, found at Stari Ras
- Born: 11th century Byzantine Empire
- Died: after 1090s
- Military career
- Allegiance: Byzantine Empire
- Rank: protonobelissimos
- Conflicts: Battle of Levounion

Nikolaos Synesios (Greek: Νικόλαος Συνέσιος) was a Byzantine court official (protoproedros) and army commander (protonobelissimos) that served under emperor Alexios I Komnenos (r. 1081–1118).

Synesios is mentioned without a given name in the biographical work Alexiad of Anna Komnene, the daughter of emperor Alexios I. At least three of his seals have been found, two which mention him as protonobelissimos. His military activity in the Alexiad is dated to 1087–1091, when he is described as a commander close to Alexios I that fought against the Pechenegs in the Balkans. One of his seals was found at the frontier fortress of Stari Ras towards Serbia (in southwestern Serbia), with the depiction of St. Nicholas on the obverse. Another seal was likely found in southern or southeastern Bulgarian theme, with the title of protoproedros. The Alexiad mentions the last of Synesios' activity as the Battle of Lebounion (1091) against the Pechenegs. His elevation to protonobelissimos, as evident in the seals, is likely after the Pecheneg campaign and dates perhaps to the campaign against Serbian ruler Vukan in the 1090s. The seals of Alexios, Eustathios Kamytzes and Constantine Dalassenos were also found at Stari Ras, with Dalassenos known to have commanded troops alongside Alexios at Lebounion.

His seal found at Ras was inventoried by Serbian Byzantologist Ljubomir Maksimović as seal #805.

== Sources ==
- Ivanišević, Vujadin; Krsmanović, Bojana (2013). "Byzantine seals from the Ras fortress" (PDF). Recueil des travaux de l'Institut d'études byzantines. 50 (1): 449–460. doi:10.2298/ZRVI1350449I.
- Komnene, Anna (1969) [1148]. The Alexiad of Anna Comnena. Translated by Sewter, E. R. A. Penguin Classics, London. ISBN 0-14-044215-4.
- Popović, Marko (1999). Tvrđava Ras [The Fortress of Ras] (in Serbian). Belgrade: Archaeological Institute. ISBN 9788680093147.
  - Maksimović, Ljubomir (1999). "Olovni pečati vizantijskog porekla". Tvrđava Ras [The Fortress of Ras] (in Serbian). Belgrade: Archaeological Institute. pp. 437–439. ISBN 9788680093147.
