= Catepanate of Ras =

Province of the Byzantine Empire

Catepanate of Ras Κατεπανίκιον Ἄρσης
- Province of Byzantine Empire
- 971–976
- Capital: Ras
  - Type: Catepanate
- Historical era: Middle Ages
  - Established: 971
  - Disestablished: 976
| Preceded by | Succeeded by |
| Principality of Serbia (early medieval) | First Bulgarian Empire |

The Catepanate of Ras (Byzantine Greek: Κατεπανίκιον Ἄρσης) was a province (catepanate) of the Byzantine Empire, established around 971 in central regions of early medieval Serbia, during the rule of Byzantine Emperor John Tzimiskes (969–976). The catepanate was named after the fortified town of Ras, eponymous for the historical region of Raška (Latin: Rascia). The province was short-lived, and collapsed soon after 976, following the Byzantine retreat from the region after the restoration of the Bulgarian Empire.

== History ==
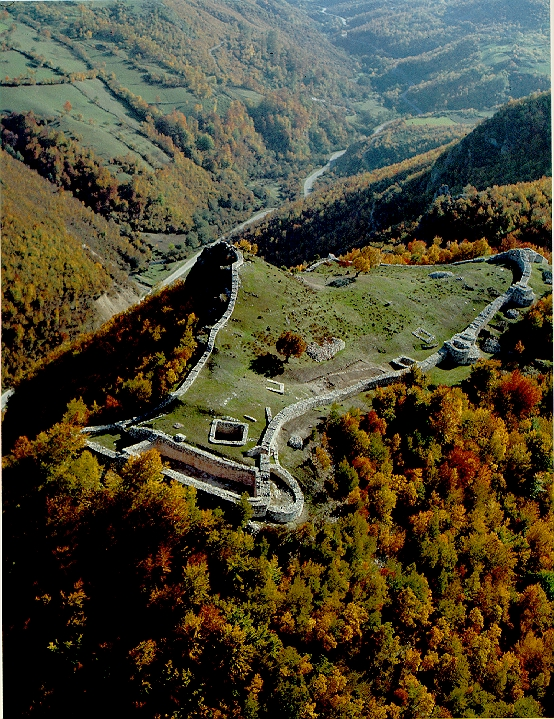
Medieval fortified city of Ras

In the middle of the 6th century, during the reign of Byzantine emperor Justinian I (d. 565), a fortress of Arsa (Greek: Ἄρσα) in the province of Dardania was refortified, as attested by historian Procopius. At the beginning of the 7th century, Byzantine rule collapsed, and the region was settled by the Slavs. Up to the middle of the 10th century, the fortress of Ras was a borderline stronghold between the Principality of Serbia and First Bulgarian Empire, as attested by the Byzantine emperor and historian Constantine VII Porphyrogenitus (d. 959) in his work De Administrando Imperio.

The earliest possible date of later Byzantine invasion of Rascian region and the creation of a province is around 971, when Byzantine armies conquered Bulgaria and re-established Byzantine supreme rule over the interior of Southeastern Europe. One of the newly formed administrative units was the Catepanate of Ras. It was established as a Byzantine stronghold in Serbian lands, but its territorial jurisdiction can not be precisely determined, but Serbia probably also was conquered. The Catepanate was short-lived, as well as the Byzantine rule in the rest of Bulgarian and Serbian lands. After the death of emperor John (976), a successful uprising started in the South Slavic provinces of the Byzantine Empire, led by Cometopuli, resulting in total breakdown of Byzantine power in the region and the restoration of the Bulgarian Empire.

The main sources for the organization of the Catepanate of Ras is a seal of a strategos of Ras, dated to the reign of Byzantine Emperor John Tzimiskes (969–976). The seal belonged to protospatharios and katepano of Ras named John.

After 976, the region was dominated by the restored Bulgarian Empire, that had complex relations with neighbouring Serbian princes. Byzantine rule in the region was restored in 1018, under emperor Basil II (d. 1025), and new administrative units in Serbian lands were created, including new themes, one centered in the region of Syrmia to the north (Theme of Sirmium), and other in central Serbia (Theme of Serbia).

== See also ==
- Early Medieval Principality of Serbia
- Chronicle of the Priest of Duklja
- Sviatoslav's invasion of Bulgaria
- Byzantine conquest of Bulgaria
- Raška (region)

== Sources ==
- Булић, Дејан (2007). "Градина-Казновиће, резултати археолошких истраживања" [Gradina-Kazanoviće, Results of Archeological Research]. Историјски часопис (in Serbian). 55: 45–62.
- Ćirković, Sima (2004). The Serbs. Malden: Blackwell Publishing. ISBN 9781405142915.
- Ivanišević, Vujadin; Krsmanović, Bojana (2013). "Byzantine seals from the Ras fortress" (PDF). Recueil des travaux de l'Institut d'études byzantines. 50 (1): 449–460. doi:10.2298/ZRVI1350449I.
- Калић, Јованка (1989). "Прокопијева Арса". Зборник радова Византолошког института. 27–28: 9–17.
- Kalić, Jovanka (1995). "Rascia - The Nucleus of the Medieval Serbian State". The Serbian Question in the Balkans. Belgrade: Faculty of Geography. pp. 147–155.
- Komatina, Ivana (2016). Црква и држава у српским земљама од XI до XIII века [Church and State in the Serbian Lands from the XIth to the XIIIth Century]. Београд: Institute of History. ISBN 9788677431136.
- Krsmanović, Bojana (2008). The Byzantine Province in Change: On the Threshold Between the 10th and the 11th Century. Belgrade: Institute for Byzantine Studies. ISBN 9789603710608.
- Кунчер, Драгана (2009). Gesta Regum Sclavorum. Vol. 1. Београд-Никшић: Историјски институт, Манастир Острог.
- Madgearu, Alexandru (2008). "The mission of Hierotheos: Location and Significance". Byzantinoslavica. 66: 119–138.
- Madgearu, Alexandru (2013). Byzantine Military Organization on the Danube, 10th–12th Centuries. Leiden-Boston: Brill. ISBN 9789004252493.
- Moravcsik, Gyula, ed. (1967) [1949]. Constantine Porphyrogenitus: De Administrando Imperio (2nd revised ed.). Washington D.C.: Dumbarton Oaks Center for Byzantine Studies. ISBN 9780884020219.
- Nesbitt, John; Oikonomides, Nicolas, eds. (1991). Catalogue of Byzantine Seals at Dumbarton Oaks and in the Fogg Museum of Art, Volume 1: Italy, North of the Balkans, North of the Black Sea. Washington, DC: Dumbarton Oaks Research Library and Collection. ISBN 0-88402-194-7.
- Ostrogorsky, George (1956). History of the Byzantine State. Oxford: Basil Blackwell.
- Stephenson, Paul (2003a). The Legend of Basil the Bulgar-Slayer. Cambridge: Cambridge University Press. ISBN 9780521815307.
- Stephenson, Paul (2003b). "The Balkan Frontier in the Year 1000". Byzantium in the Year 1000. BRILL. pp. 109–134. ISBN 9004120971.
- Vlasto, Alexis P. (1970). The Entry of the Slavs into Christendom: An Introduction to the Medieval History of the Slavs. Cambridge: Cambridge University Press. ISBN 9780521074599.
- Živković, Tibor (2008). Forging unity: The South Slavs between East and West 550-1150. Belgrade: The Institute of History, Čigoja štampa. ISBN 9788675585732.
- Живковић, Тибор (2009). Gesta Regum Sclavorum. Vol. 2. Београд-Никшић: Историјски институт, Манастир Острог.
