= Đurđevi stupovi =

Monastery in Serbia

Coordinates: 43°09′56″N 20°29′48″E

Đurđevi Stupovi Monastery
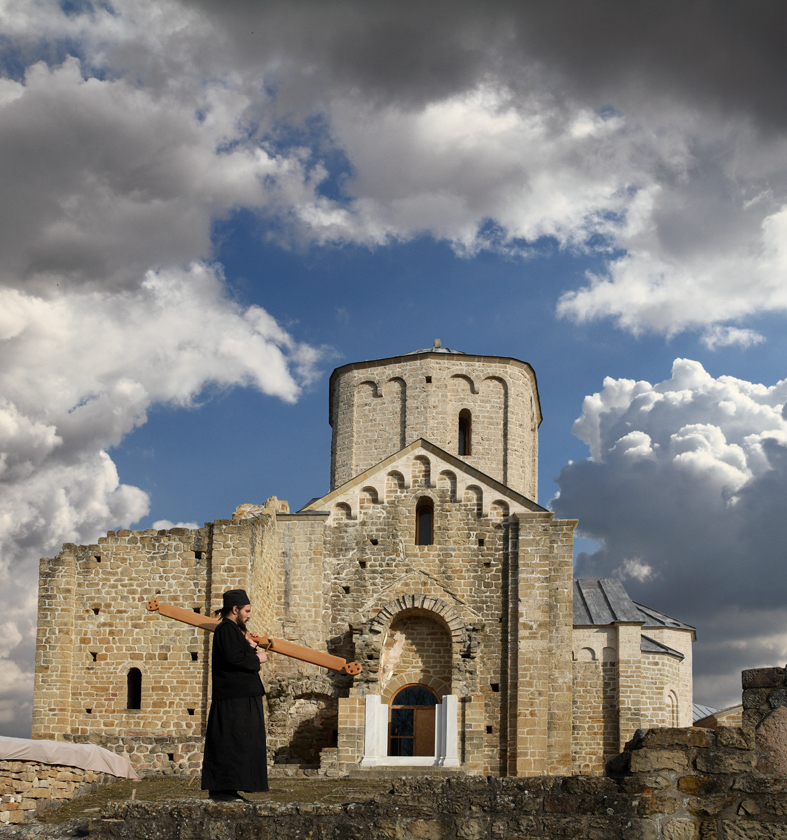
- Exterior view of monastery
- Đurđevi Stupovi Monastery
- Location: Novi Pazar, Serbia
- Country: Serbia
- Denomination: Serbian Orthodox

History
- Founder: Stefan Nemanja
- Dedication: Holy Virgin

Architecture
- Functional status: Public access
- Style: Raška school Byzantine
- Years built: 1170
- Completed: 1170

Specifications
- Materials: Stone

Administration
- Archdiocese: Eparchy of Raška and Prizren

UNESCO World Heritage Site
- Type: Cultural
- Criteria: i, iii
- Designated: 1979 (3rd)
- Part of: Stari Ras and Sopoćani
- Reference no.: 96
- Region: Europe and North America

Cultural Heritage of Serbia
- Official name: Manastir Đurđevi stupovi
- Type: Cultural monument of Exceptional Importance
- Designated: 26 August 1947
- Reference no.: SK 155

The Đurđevi Stupovi Monastery (Serbian: Манастир Ђурђеви ступови, romanized: Manastir Đurđevi stupovi, lit. "Pillars of St. George") is a Serbian Orthodox monastery located in the vicinity of medieval Stari Ras and today's city of Novi Pazar, in the Raška region of Serbia.

The monastery is located near Novi Pazar, on the top of a prominent elevation covered with woods. It was erected in ca. 1170 as an endowment of Grand Prince Stefan Nemanja, dedicated to Saint George; it is known as the "Pillars of St. George". The monastery is exceptional not only for its position and significance it had according to medieval chronicles and manuscripts, but also for its particular architecture. It was named after the church dedicated to St George and its two former bell towers, two high towers – pillars (old Slavic language- stolp, stub). Namely, according to Stefan the First-Crowned, Nemanja had built this church to commemorate his gratitude to St. George for saving him from dungeons-caves where he was put by his brothers.

== Gallery ==
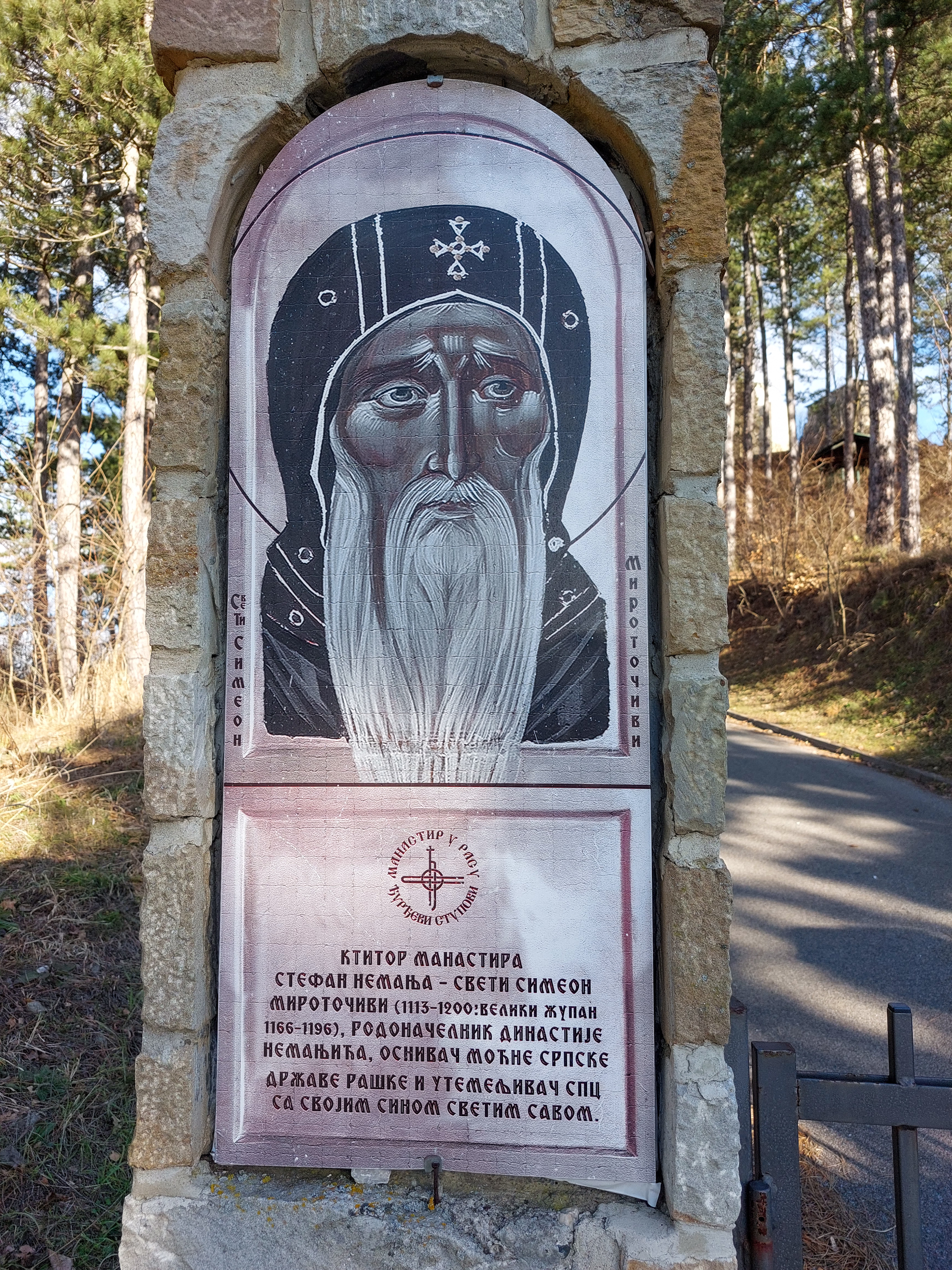
At the entrance.

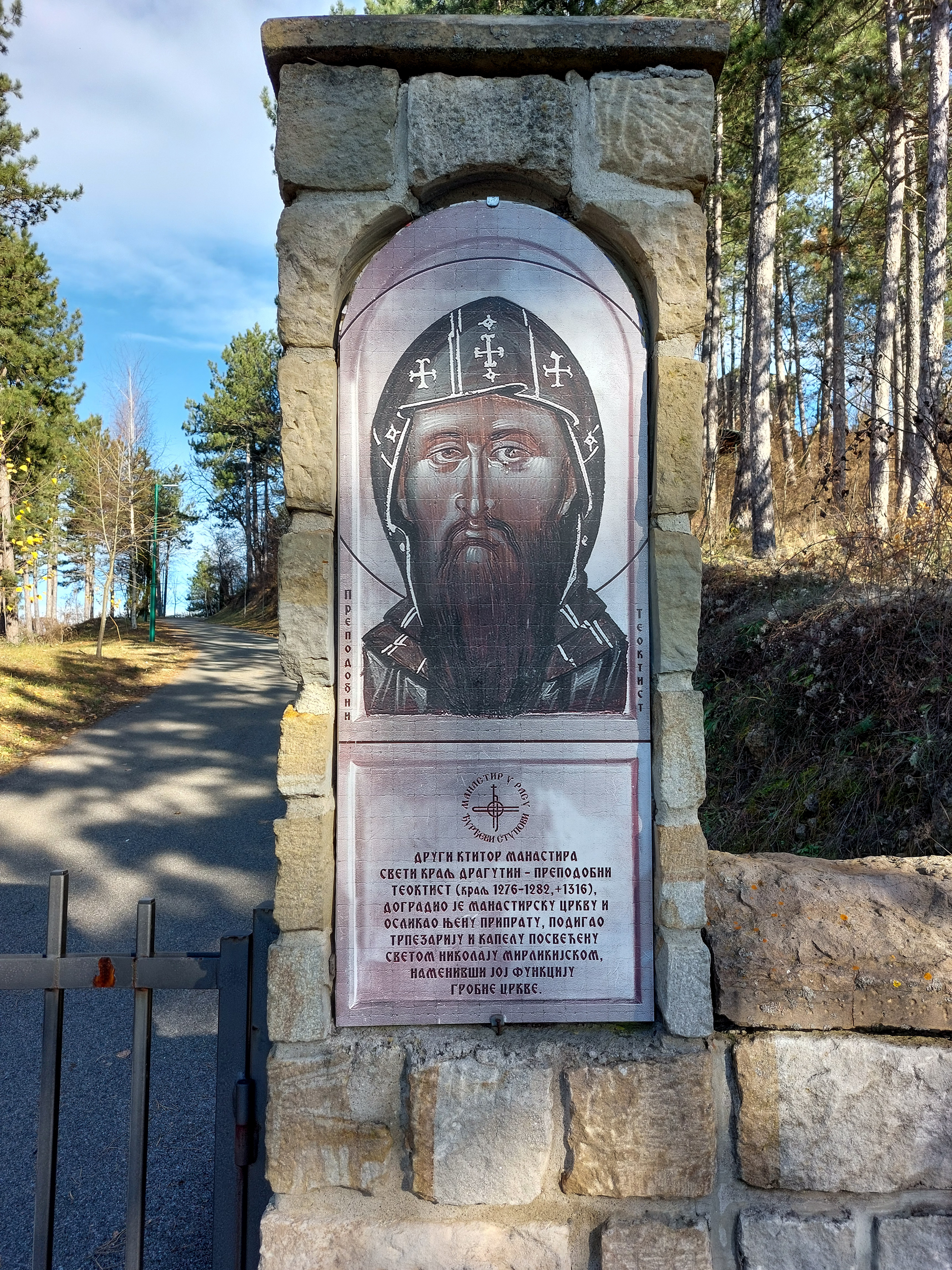
At the entrance.

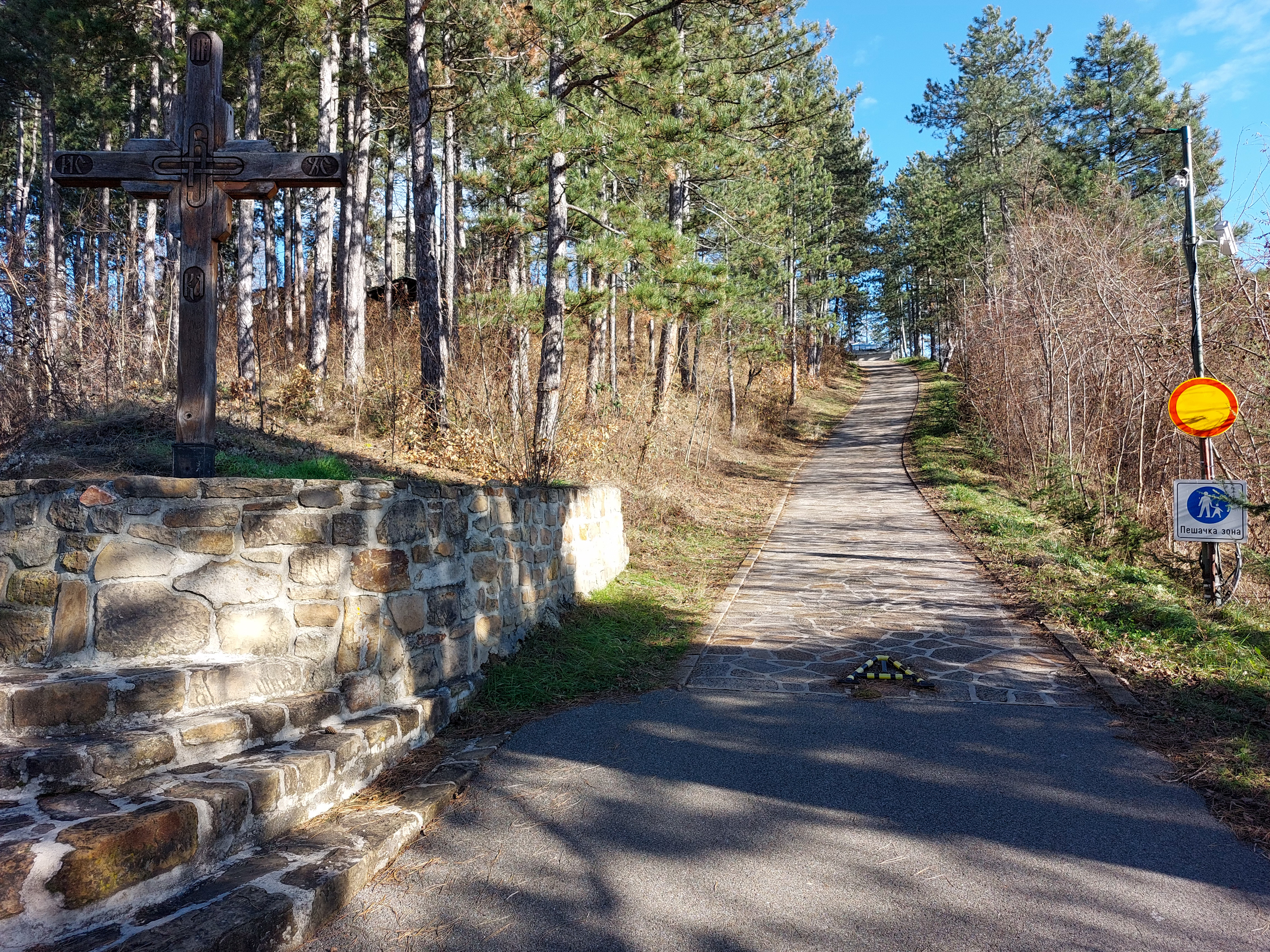
A footpath which lead to the Monastery.

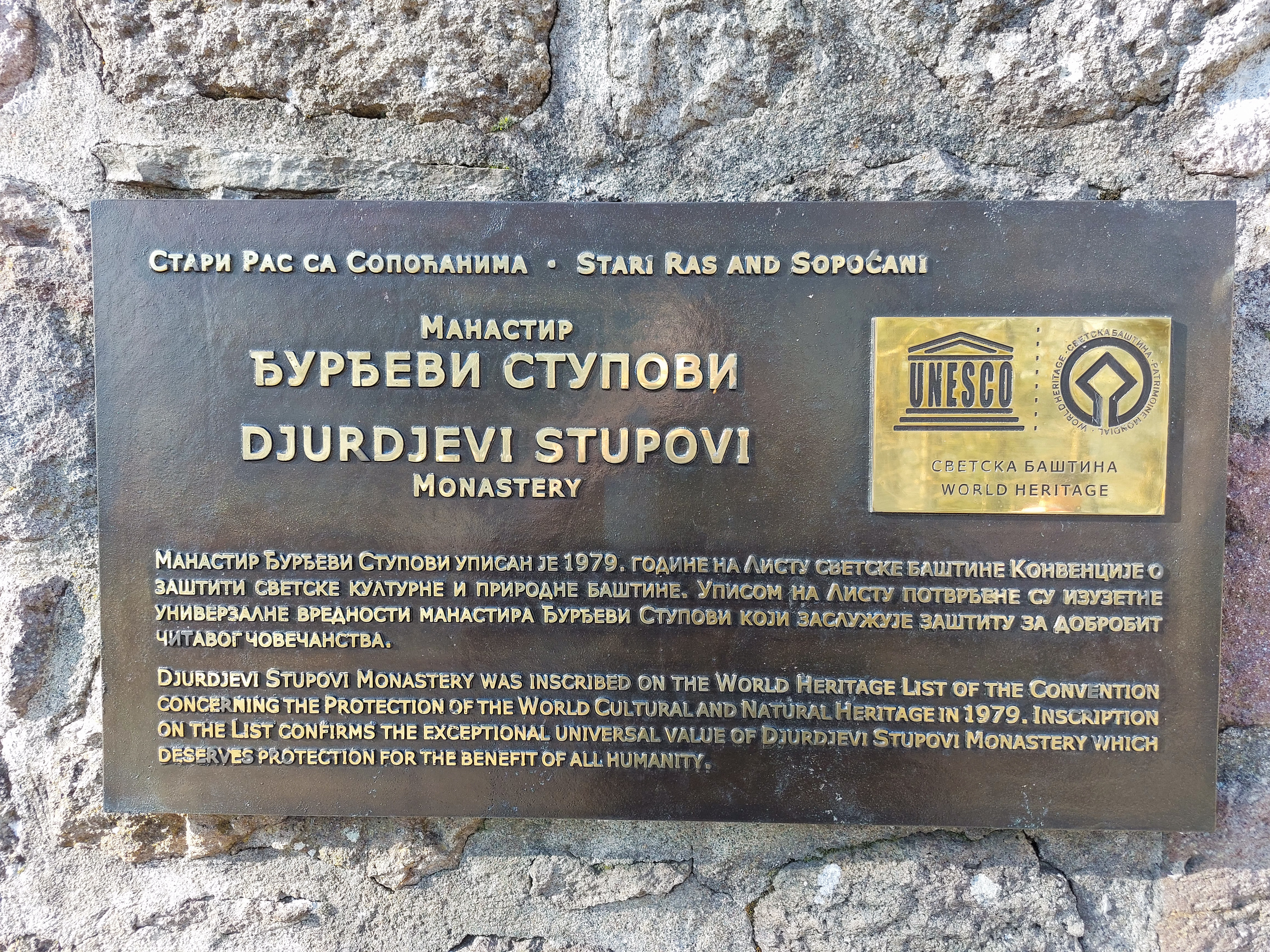

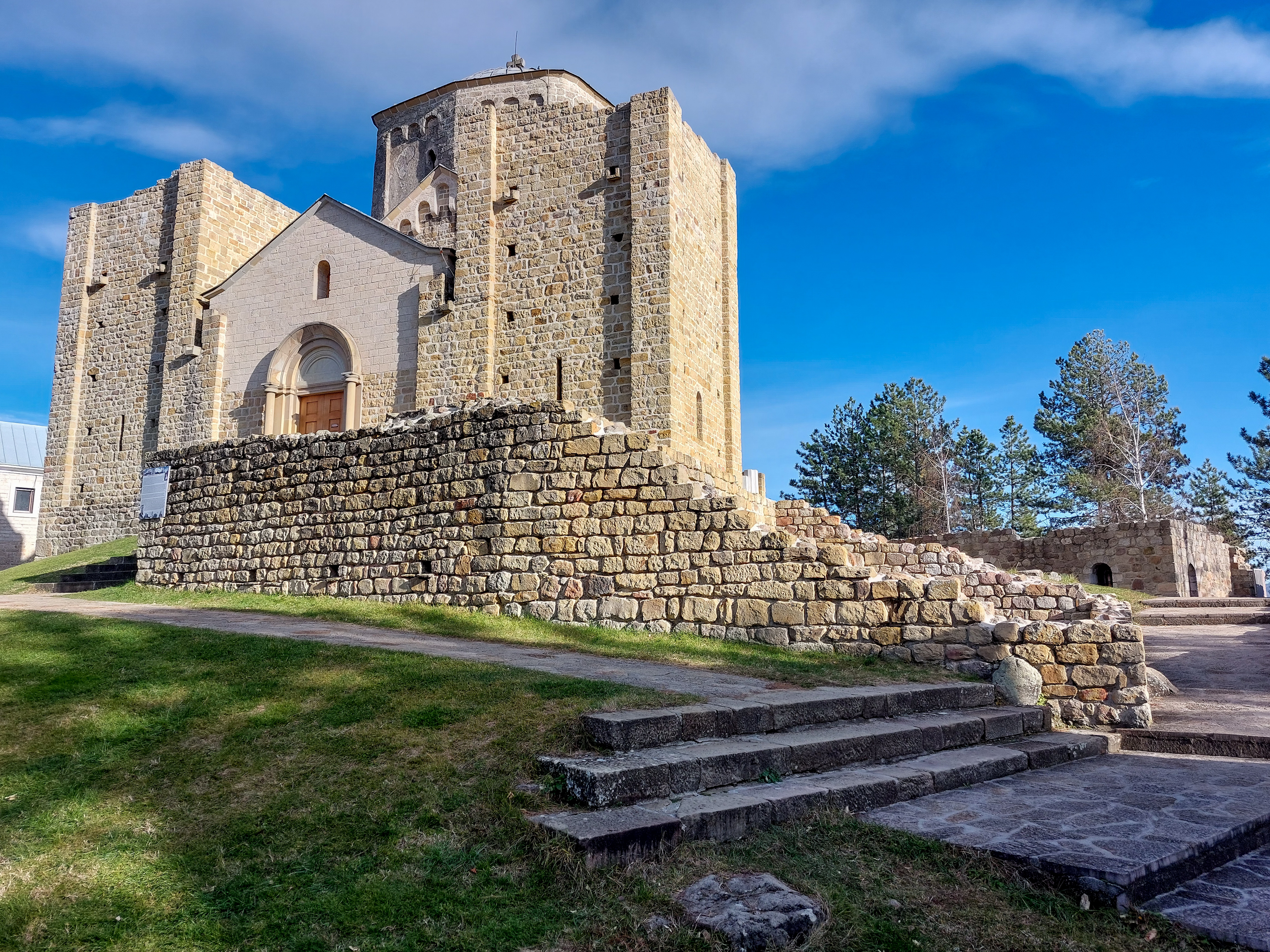
Monastery complex.

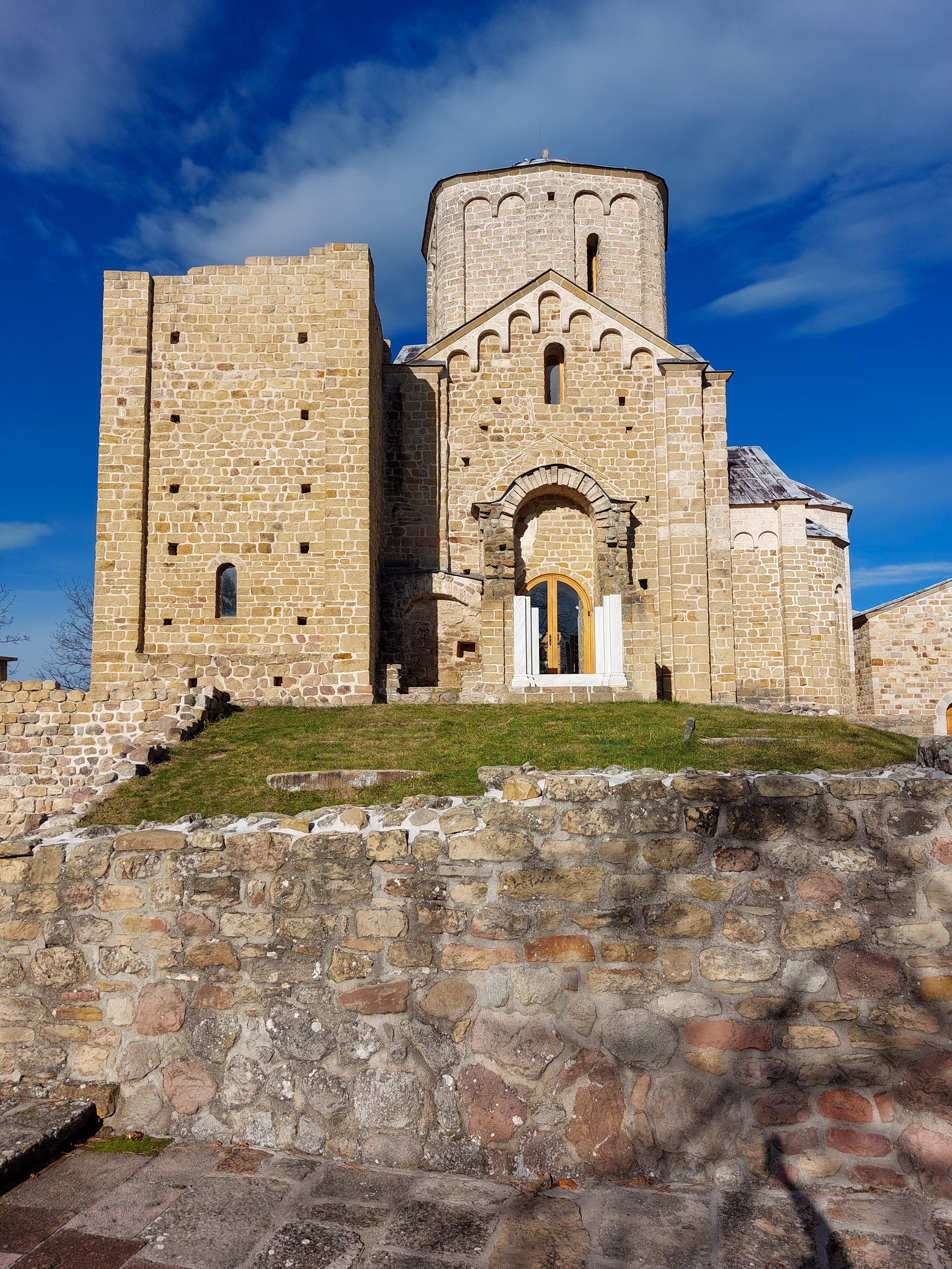
Monastery complex.

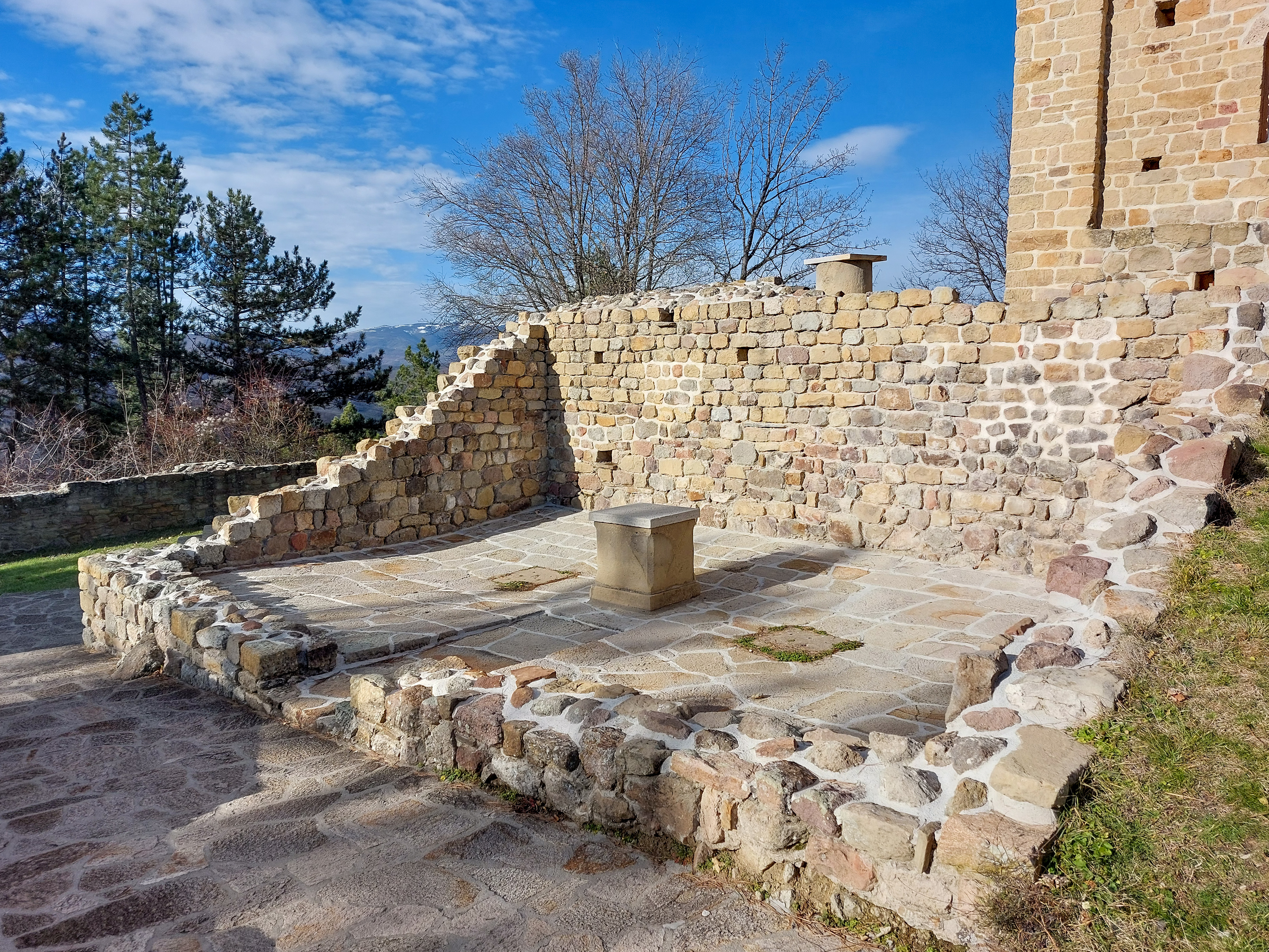
Monastery complex.

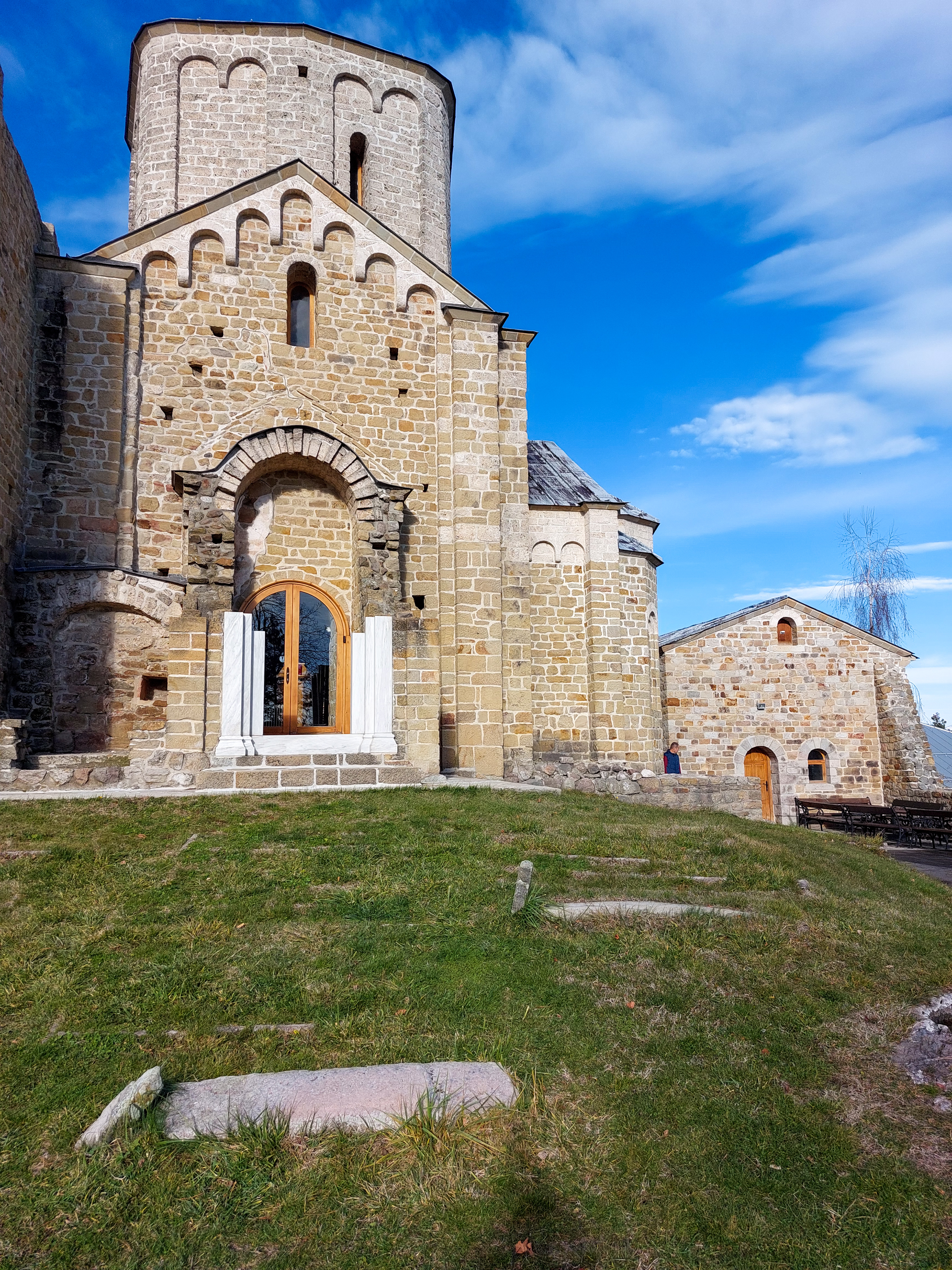
Monastery complex.

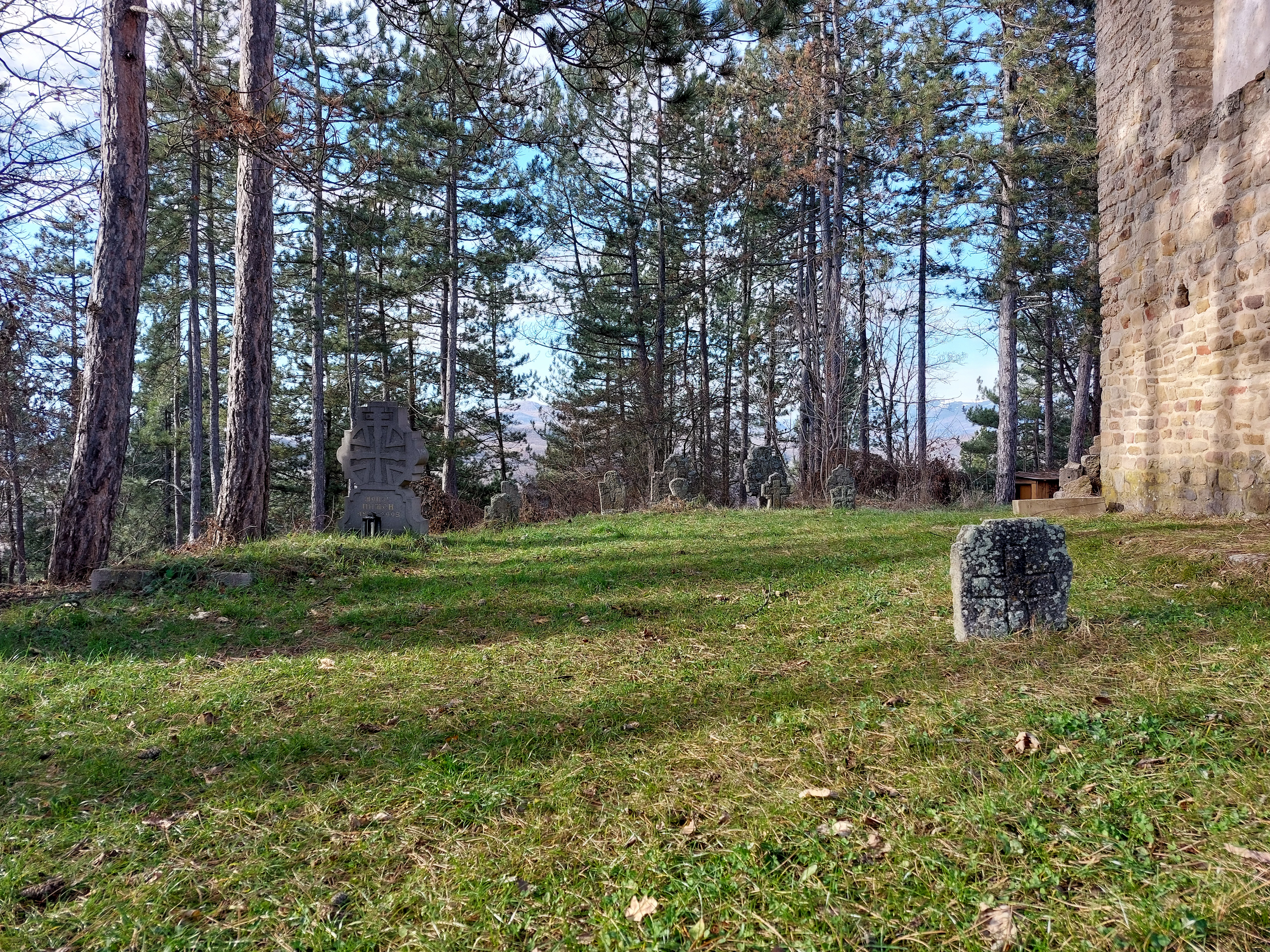

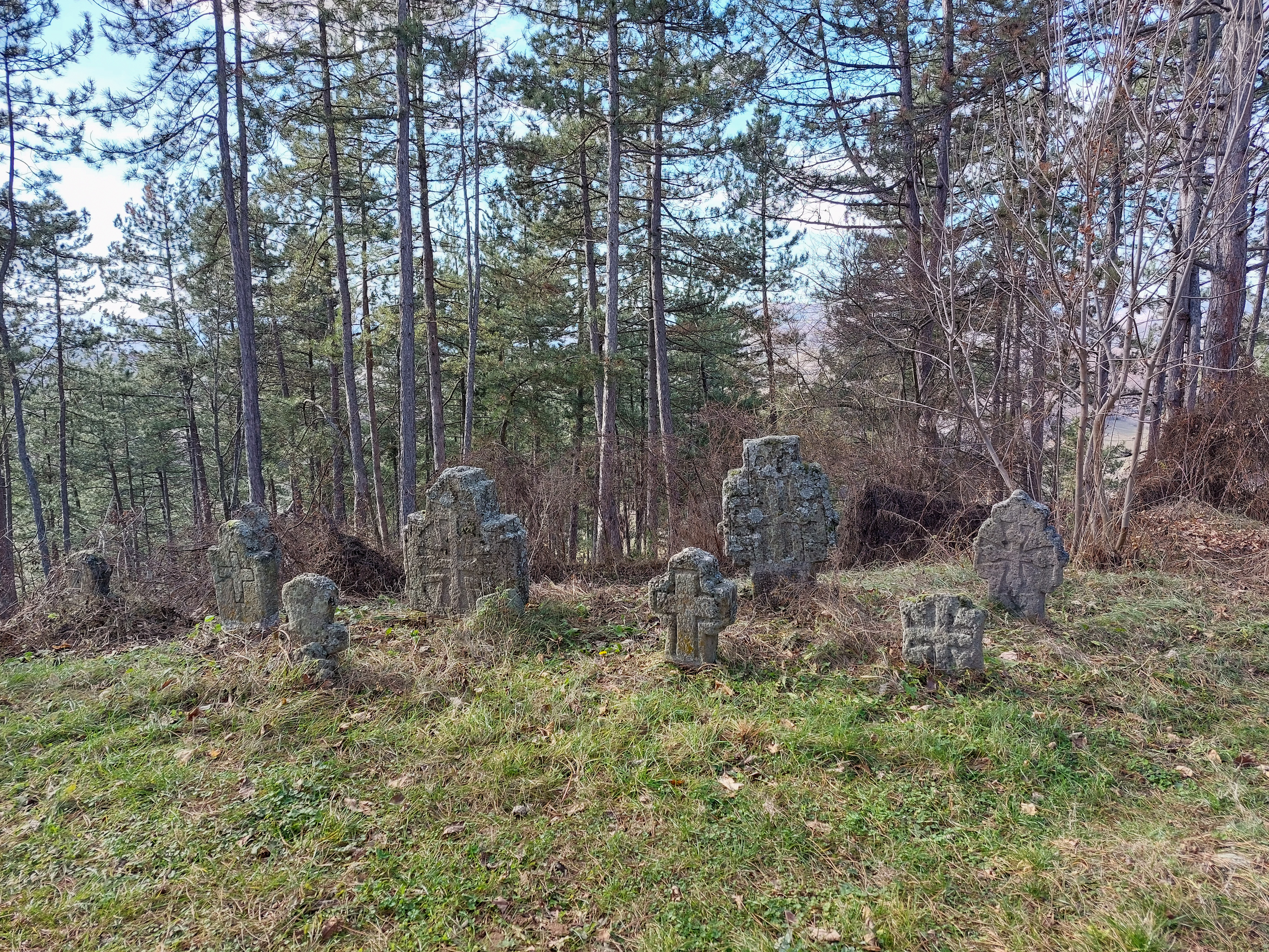

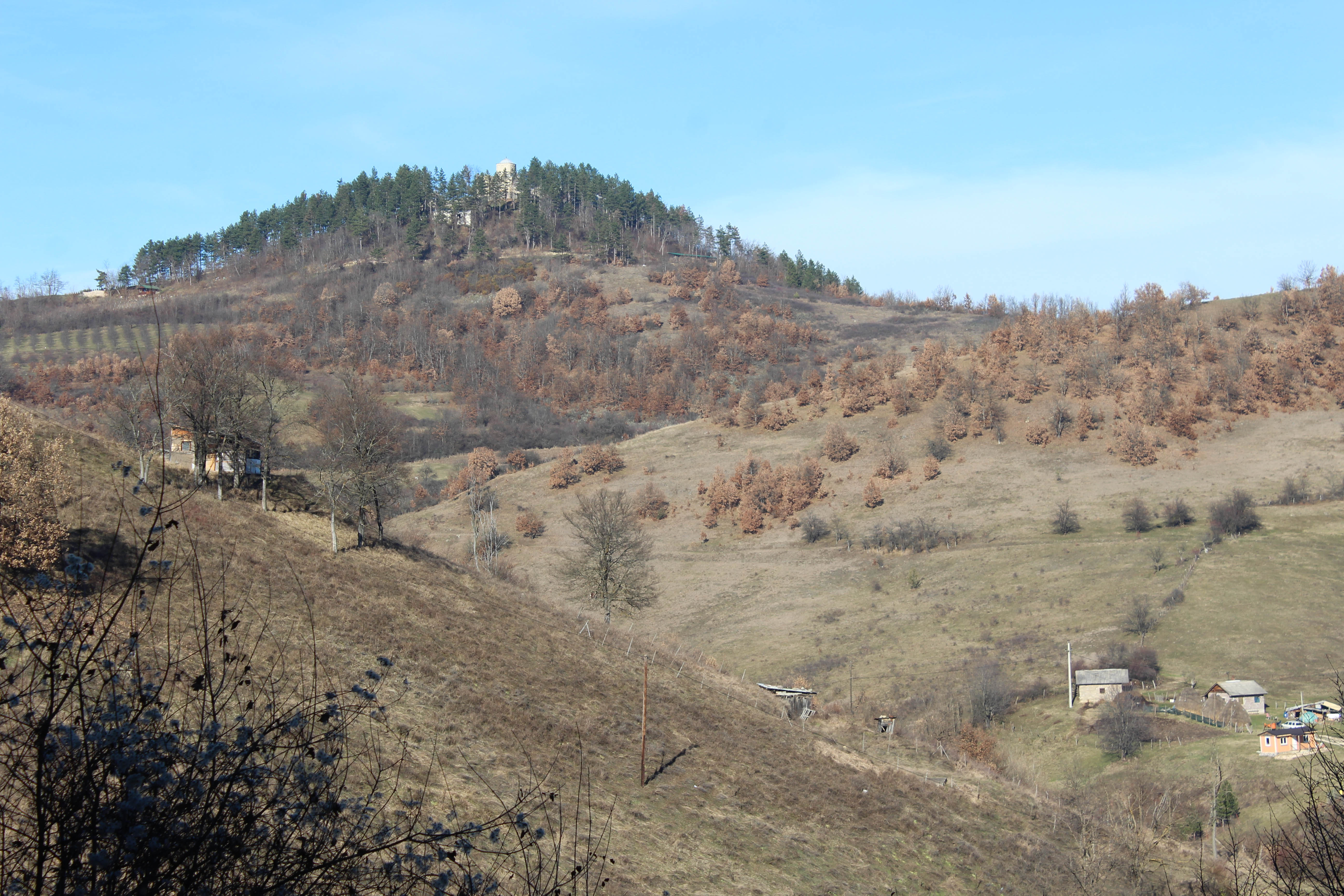
The monastery was built on this prominent hill.

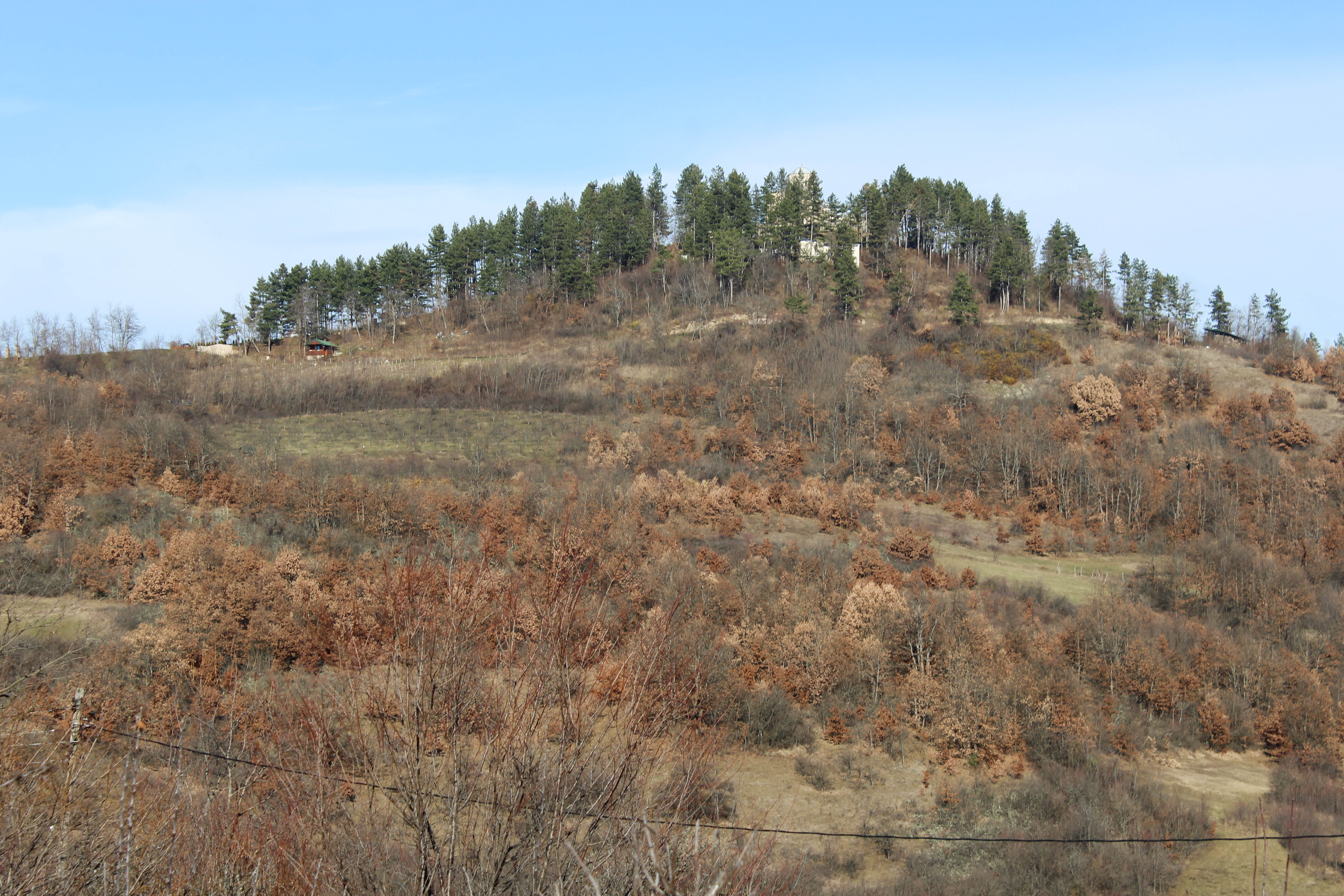
The monastery was built on this prominent hill.

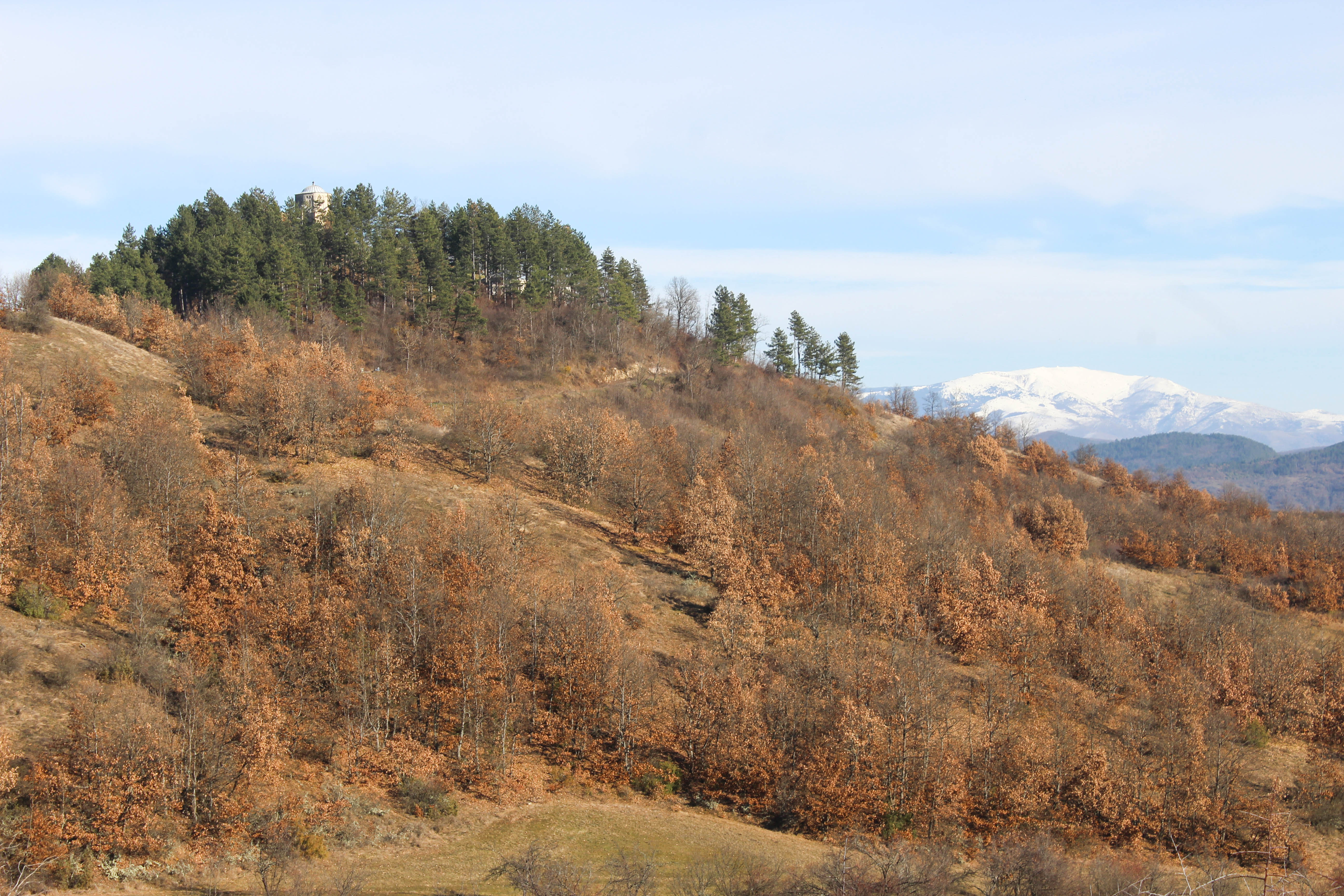
The monastery was built on this prominent hill.

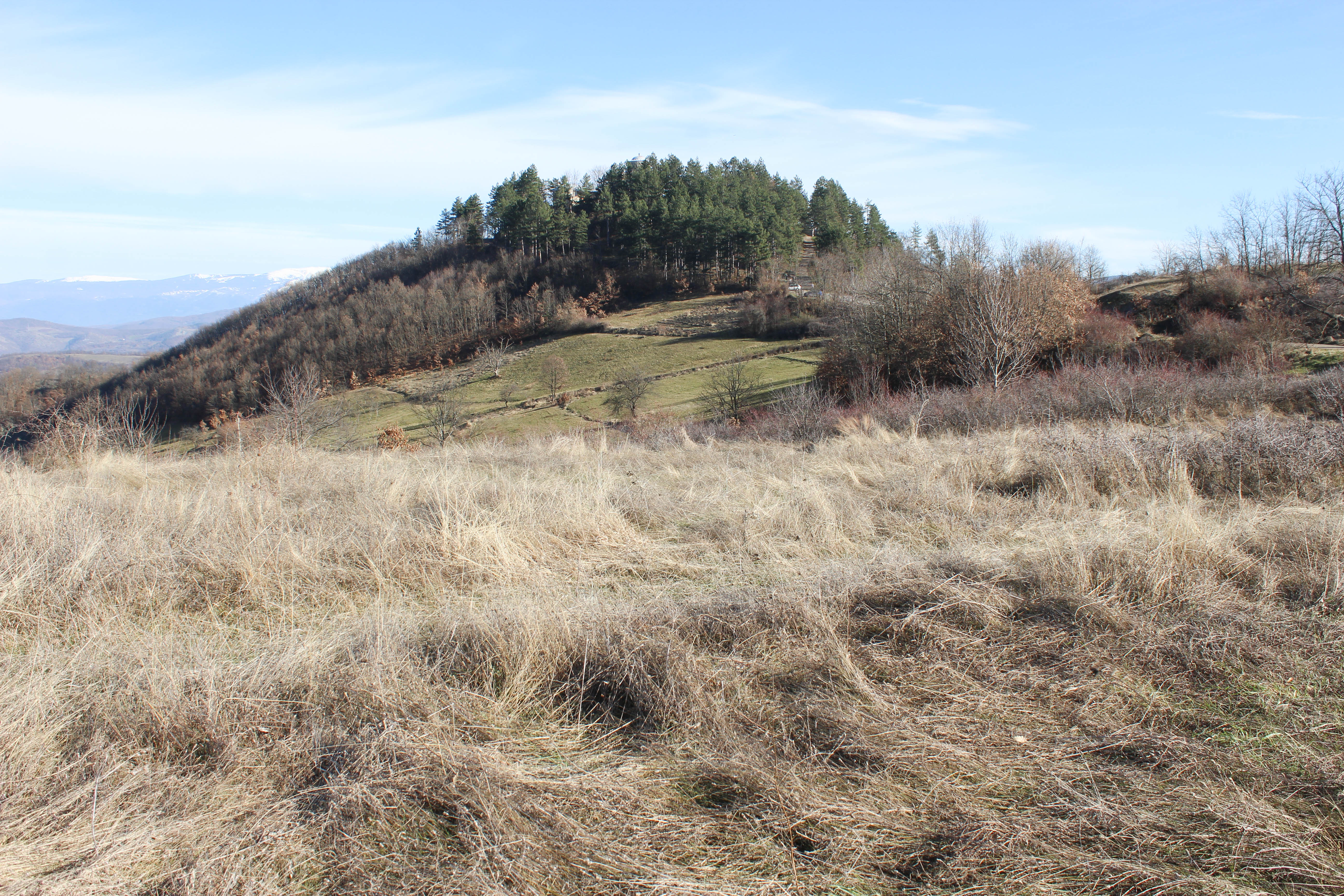
The monastery was built on this prominent hill.

== Burials ==
- Stefan Dragutin of Serbia

== See also ==
- List of Serbian Orthodox monasteries

== Sources ==
- Vojvodić, Dragan; Marković, Miodrag (2023). Djurdjevi Stupovi in Ras. Novi Sad: Platoneum.
