= Ottoman Macedonia =

Ottoman Macedonia may refer to:

- The region of Macedonia when ruled by the Ottoman Empire from the 14th to early 20th century
  - Salonica vilayet, administrative division of the Ottoman Empire from 1867 to 1912 covering southern and eastern parts of the region
  - Manastir vilayet, administrative division from 1874 to 1877 covering western parts of the region of Macedonia
  - Kosovo vilayet, administrative division from 1878 until 1909 covering some northern parts of the region of Macedonia
- Macedonia (Greece) § Ottoman rule, for history of Ottoman rule on the territory of present-day Greek Macedonia
- North Macedonia under the Ottoman Empire, for history of Ottoman rule on the territory of present-day North Macedonia

== See also ==
- Demographic history of Macedonia § Ottoman rule, demographic history of the region of Macedonia under the Ottoman Empire
- Slavic speakers in Ottoman Macedonia, Slavic ethnolinguistic groups in Ottoman Macedonia
- Macedonia (disambiguation)
- Macedonia (terminology)
