= Aprakos =

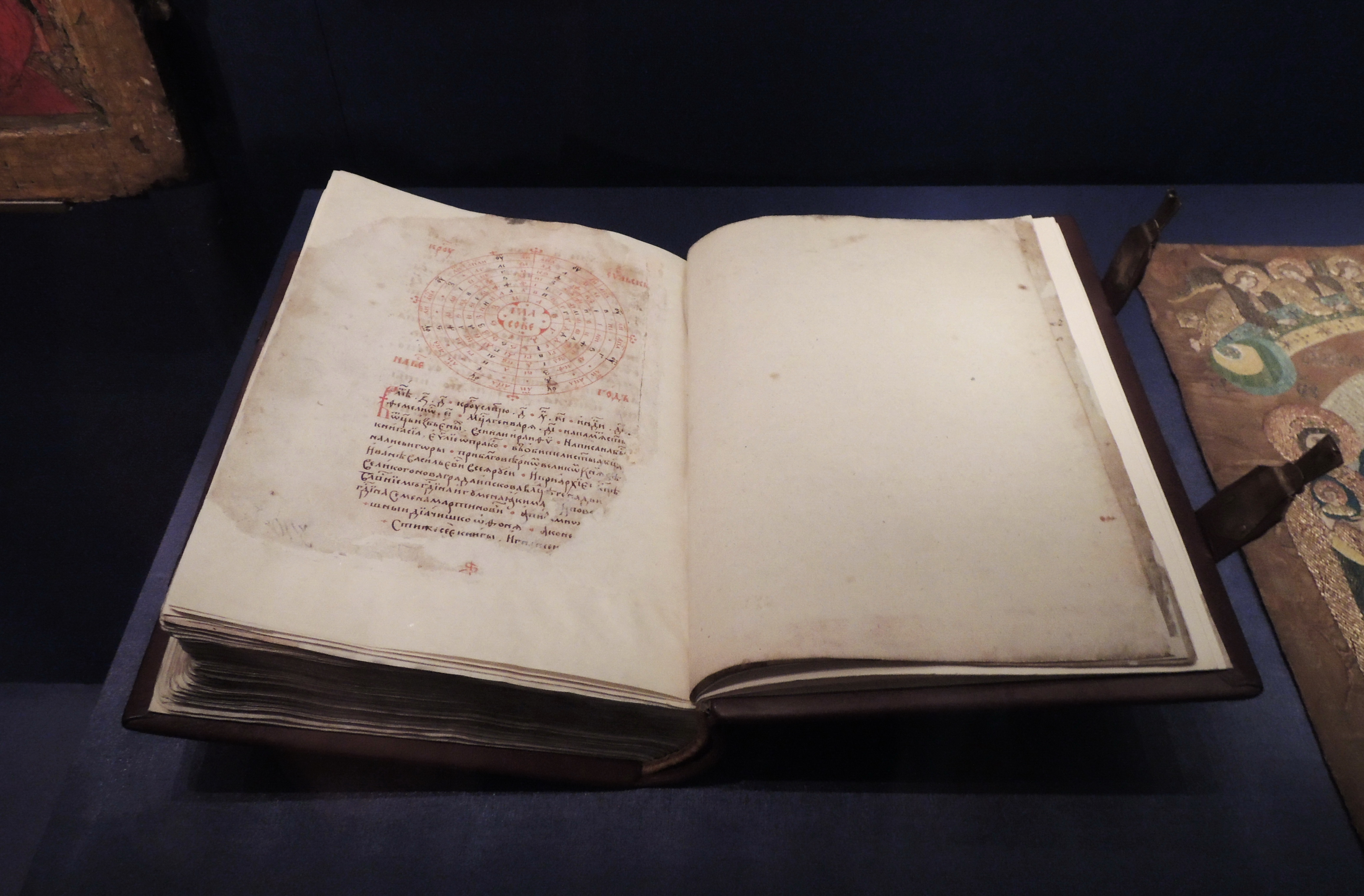
A 1496 aprakos Gospel from Lisitskiy monastery, Novgorod.

An aprakos is a reading of Gospel or Epistle book, otherwise known as daily or liturgical Gospel readings.

In aprakoses, the text is organized not in the natural order of books, but along with the weekly church readings starting from Bright Week (Easter) as used in the Eastern Orthodox Church. In particular, the text of Aprakos-Gospels begins with the first chapter of Gospel according to John, whereas regular Gospels (Tetra-Gospels) begin with the Gospel according to Matthew. Many of the oldest Slavic manuscripts are aprakoses, like Codex Assemanius, Ostromir Gospels or Vukan's Gospel.

Similar books used in Western Christianity are known as Lectionaries (a much broader meaning), or as Evangeliarium or Evangelistarium (Gospels only).
