= Raška (region) =

Historical region of Serbia

Raška Рашка
- Historical and geographical region of Serbia
- Coat of arms of Raška (Fojnica Armorial)
- Country: Serbia
- Largest city: Novi Pazar

Population
  - Total: c. 340,000

Raška (Serbian Cyrillic: Рашка; Latin: Rascia) is a geographical and historical region in the southwestern Serbia. Initially a small borderline district between early medieval Serbia and Bulgaria (city/area of Ras), and the Byzantine Empire, it became the center of the Grand Principality of Serbia and later of the Serbian Kingdom. From that period on, the name of Raška became associated with the state of Serbia, eventually covering the southwestern parts of modern-day Serbia and northern parts of modern-day Montenegro.

== Etymology ==
The name is derived from the name of the region's most important fortress, Ras, which first appeared in the 6th century sources as Arsa, recorded under that name in the work De aedificiis of Byzantine historian Procopius. By the 10th century, the variant Ras became common name for the fort, as attested by the work De Administrando Imperio, written by Constantine Porphyrogenitus, and also by the Byzantine seal of John, governor of Ras (c. 971–976). At the same time, Ras became the seat of the Eastern Orthodox Eparchy of Ras, with episcopal see in the Church of the Holy Apostles Peter and Paul. The name of the eparchy eventually started to denote the entire area under its jurisdiction and later, thus becoming the common regional name.

Under Stefan Nemanja (1166–1196), the region was finally conquered by the Serbs and the fortress of Ras was re-generated as the state capital, and as such it became the eponymous name for the Grand Principality of Serbia and mainly the Serbian Kingdom. The first attested use of the term Raška (Latin: Rascia or Rassia) as a designation for the Serbian state was made in a charter issued in Kotor in 1186, mentioning Stefan Nemanja as the ruler of Rascia.

Without any evidence and support in the historical sources, the early historical region of Raška is commonly misidentified and misunderstood as a synonym for Serbian state before the mid-12th century (influenced by the semi-mythical 14th century Chronicle of the Priest of Duklja which anachronistically calls the Principality of Serbia as Raška). The high medieval chronicle also gives the impression that Raška was not considered as the central and capital part of medieval Serbia, but as a separate small domain within Serbia.

== History ==
=== Middle Ages ===
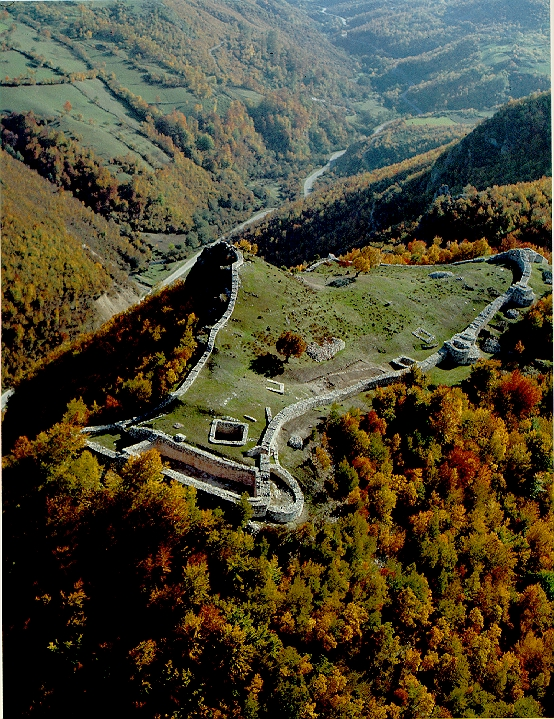
Ruins of the fortress of Ras, one of the centers of the Grand Principality of Serbia

The 10th-century De Administrando Imperio mentions Rasa (Stari Ras) as a border area between Bulgaria and Serbia at the end of the 9th century. It was not mentioned among the inhabited cities of early medieval Serbia, and there is no general consensus as to whether Ras was on the Serbian or Bulgarian side of the border, as well as whether its mention in DAI referred to a fortress or an area. The consideration that the Serbian border was further to the Southeast of Ras is poorly substantiated. Newer research indicates that the principal settlement of Ras and its region in the 9th and 10th century was part of the First Bulgarian Empire. Bulgarian borderline was at Pešter plateau and to the north at Čačak.

In 971, the Byzantine Catepanate of Ras was established, but in 976 Bulgarian control was restored. Basil II recaptured it in 1018, and by 1032, the overall commander of the region was strategoi and doukes Constantine Diogenes, as part of a defensive line of Byzantine watchtowers alongside Lipjan, Zvečan, Galič, Jeleč south of Ras and Brvenik north of Ras, watching to the west over a "no-man's-land" named Zygos mountains beyond which was Serbia. Recent archaeological research supports the notion that the Byzantines held control of Ras during Alexios I Komnenos's reign (1048–1118), but possibly not continuously. In the time of Alexios, Ras was one of the northern border military strongholds that was fortified. His seal which dates to the period 1081–1092 was found in 2018 near the site. It is possible that Vukan may have temporarily taken Ras and other watchtowers in the early 1090s, but although John Ducas regained most of them, in 1093 Vukan "ravaged the neighbouring towns and districts. He even got as far as Lipjan, which he deliberately burnt down", but when Alexios came close, Vukan escaped to Zvečan and started peace negotiations, and reportedly his attack on the watchtowers was a countermeasure against their commanders who ravaged Serbian eastern frontiers.

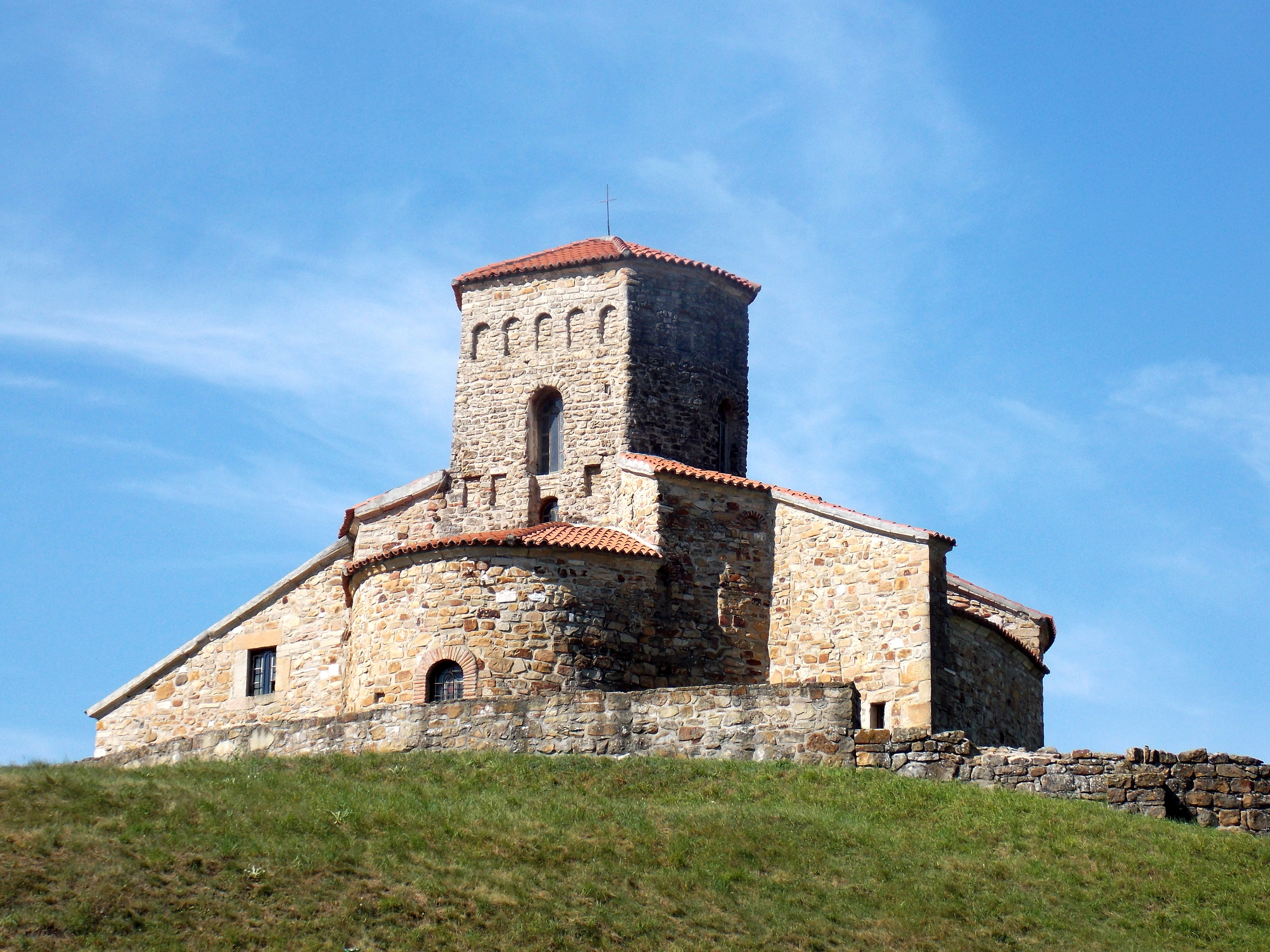
Church of the Holy Apostles Peter and Paul, near Novi Pazar

The Byzantine border fort of Ras was most likely burnt c. 1120-1122, and this is probably the reason why John II Komnenos undertook a punitive campaign against the Serbs, during which many Serbs from the region of Raška were deported to Asia Minor. The alliance between Hungary and the Serbian rulers remained in place and Ras was burnt again by the Serbian army in 1127–1129. Its last commander was a Kritoplos who was then punished by the Emperor for the fall of the fortress. In 1149, Manuel I Comnenus recovered the fortress of Ras and Galič, and the following year, continued to successfully fight off the Serbians and Hungarians, with the Serbs swearing loyalty to the Byzantines. Somewhere in the next decades, Serbians conquered and started to fully control Ras, with Stefan Nemanja building the monastery of Đurđevi stupovi in celebration of the feat, with an inscription showing that the end of the construction was in 1170-1171. It became a royal residence, but it was not a permanent residence or that of his successors as the ruling dynasty also ruled over other such palatial centres in its territory. Byzantine intervention continued until the end of the 12th century and the Serb feudal rulers of the region were often under Byzantine suzerainty. The full independence of Serbia including Raška's region was recognized by the Byzantines in 1190 after an indecisive war between Isaac II Angelos and Stefan Nemanja. However, the Bulgarian-Serbian border in the late 12th and early 13th century probably was still "very fluid".

The town which had developed near the fortress of Ras and the territory which comprised its bishopric were the first significant administrative unit which Serb rulers acquired from the Byzantine Empire. As it was made the seat of the Serbian state in Latin sources of the era, Serb rulers began to be named Rasciani and their state as Rascia. The name was used among Hungarians and Germans up until the nineteenth and twentieth centuries.

==== Timeline ====
- Ras (mid 9th–mid 10th century) – Ras is borderland between the Principality of Serbia and the First Bulgarian Empire, but probably as a Bulgarian frontier district.
- Catepanate of Ras (c 971–976/1016–1127) – Raška denotes the central part of the catepanate (Byzantine frontier province).
- First Bulgarian Empire (976–1016/18)
- Byzantine Empire (1016/18–1149) – parts of the region remained Byzantine until 1149.
- Serbian Grand Principality (1120s–1240s) – Serbian forces burnt down Ras in 1127, but Byzantines renovated it and reestablished control by 1149.
- Serbian Grand Principality (mid-12th century–1217) – Raška is a central province, or capital region, under full Serbian control, with Serbia's full independence from the Byzantine Empire, including over the Raška region, recognised in 1190
- Serbian Kingdom (1217–1345) – Raška is one of the main provinces, or crownlands, although its status has gradually diminished.
- Serbian Empire (1345–1371) – Raška is one of the main inner provinces.
- Serbian Despotate (15th century) – Raška is conquered by the Ottoman Empire c. 1455.

=== Modern period ===
In 1833, some northern parts of the historical Raška region, up to the confluence of rivers Raška and Ibar, were detached from the Ottoman rule and incorporated into the Principality of Serbia. In order to mark the occasion, prince Miloš Obrenović (1815–1839) founded a new town, that was also called Raška, situated at the very confluence of Raška river and Ibar, right at the border with Ottoman territory.

In 1878, some southwestern parts of the historical Raška region, around modern Andrijevica, were liberated from the Ottoman rule and incorporated into the Principality of Montenegro. In order to mark the occasion, prince Nicholas of Montenegro (1860–1918) decided to name the newly formed Eastern Orthodox diocese as the Eparchy of Zachumlia and Raška (Serbian: Епархија захумско-рашка, romanized: Eparhija zahumsko-raška). In the 19th century the region also became part of the wider "Old Serbia" historiographical term.

In 1912, central parts of the historical Raška region were liberated from the Ottoman rule, and divided between the Kingdom of Serbia and the Kingdom of Montenegro, with eponymous medieval fortress of Stari Ras belonging to Serbia.

Between 1918 and 1922, Raška District was one of the administrative units of the Kingdom of Serbs, Croats and Slovenes. Its seat was in Novi Pazar. In 1922, a new administrative unit known as the Raška Oblast was formed with its seat in Čačak. In 1929, this administrative unit was abolished and its territory was divided among three newly formed provinces (banovinas). Within the borders of modern Serbia, post mid-12th century historical Raška region covers (approximately) the territorial span of three districts: Raška, Zlatibor and Moravica.

== Geography ==
The Raška region encompass the following sub-regions:

- Raška (in narrower sense) – territories of the City of Novi Pazar and municipalities of Raška and Tutin
- Stari Vlah – municipalities of Priboj, Prijepolje, and Nova Varoš
- Pešter – municipality of Sjenica
- Zlatibor – municipality of Čajetina

== See also ==
- List of regions of Serbia
- Sandžak

== Sources ==
- Bataković, Dušan T., ed. (2005). Histoire du peuple serbe [History of the Serbian People] (in French). Lausanne: L'Age d'Homme. ISBN 978-2-8251-1958-7.
- Ćirković, Sima (2004). The Serbs. Malden: Blackwell Publishing. ISBN 978-1-4051-4291-5.
  - Ćirković, Sima (2008). The Serbs. Malden: Blackwell Publishing. ISBN 978-1-4051-4291-5.
- Curta, Florin (2006). Southeastern Europe in the Middle Ages, 500–1250. Cambridge: Cambridge University Press.
- Curta, Florin (2019). Eastern Europe in the Middle Ages (500-1300). Leiden and Boston: Brill. ISBN 978-90-04-39519-0.
- Dimnik, Martin (1995). "Kievan Rus', the Bulgars and the southern Slavs, c. 1020-c. 1200". The New Cambridge Medieval History. Vol. 4/2. Cambridge: Cambridge University Press. pp. 254–276. ISBN 978-0-521-41411-1.
- Ducellier, Alain (2008). "Balkan power: Albania, Serbia and Bulgaria (1200–1300)". In Shepard, Jonathan (ed.). The Cambridge History of the Byzantine Empire c.500-1492. Cambridge University Press. pp. 779–802. ISBN 9780521832311.
- Ферјанчић, Божидар (1959). "Константин VII Порфирогенит". Византиски извори за историју народа Југославије. Vol. 2. Београд: Византолошки институт. pp. 1–98.
- Fine, John V. A. Jr. (1991) [1983]. The Early Medieval Balkans: A Critical Survey from the Sixth to the Late Twelfth Century. Ann Arbor: University of Michigan Press. ISBN 0-472-08149-7.
- Fine, John V. A. (1994) [1987]. The Late Medieval Balkans: A Critical Survey from the Late Twelfth Century to the Ottoman Conquest. Ann Arbor, Michigan: University of Michigan Press. ISBN 978-0-472-10079-8.
- Gigović, Ljubomir (2008). "Etnički sastav stanovništva Raške oblasti" (PDF). Globus (in Serbian). Vol. 39, no. 33. Београд. pp. 113–132. Archived from the original (PDF) on 2014-05-06.
- Hupchick, Dennis P. (2002). The Balkans: From Constantinople to Communism. New York: Palgrave. ISBN 978-0-312-21736-5.
- Ivić, Pavle, ed. (1995). The History of Serbian Culture. Edgware: Porthill Publishers. ISBN 978-1-870732-31-4.
- Janićijević, Jovan, ed. (1998). The Cultural Treasury of Serbia. Belgrade: Idea, Vojnoizdavački zavod, Markt system. ISBN 978-86-7547-039-7.
- Ivanišević, Vujadin; Krsmanović, Bojana (2013). "Byzantine Seals from the Ras Fortress" (PDF). Зборник радова Византолошког института. 50 (1): 449–460.
- Kalić, Jovanka (1979). "Назив Рашка у старијој српској историји (IX-XII век)". Зборник Филозофског факултета. 14 (1): 79–92.
- Kalić, Jovanka (1989). "Прокопијева Арса". Зборник радова Византолошког института. 27–28: 9–17.
- Kalić, Jovanka (1995). "Rascia – The Nucleus of the Medieval Serbian State". The Serbian Question in the Balkans. Belgrade: Faculty of Geography. pp. 147–155.
- Калић, Јованка (2004). "Рашка краљевина: Regnum Rasciae". Зборник радова Византолошког института. 41: 183–189.
- Калић, Јованка (2010). "Стара Рашка". Глас САНУ. 414 (15): 105–114.
- Kalić, Jovanka (2017). "The First Coronation Churches of Medieval Serbia". Balcanica (48): 7–18. doi:10.2298/BALC1748007K. hdl:21.15107/rcub_dais_4886.
- Krsmanović, Bojana (2008). The Byzantine Province in Change: On the Threshold Between the 10th and the 11th Century. Belgrade: Institute for Byzantine Studies. ISBN 978-960-371-060-8.
- Petrović, Milić F. (2007). "Raška oblast u Jugoslovenskoj državi 1918–1941". Časopis Arhiv. Vol. VIII, no. 1/2. Beograd.
- Moravcsik, Gyula, ed. (1967) [1949]. Constantine Porphyrogenitus: De Administrando Imperio (2nd revised ed.). Washington D.C.: Dumbarton Oaks Center for Byzantine Studies. ISBN 978-0-88402-021-9.
- Nesbitt, John; Oikonomides, Nicolas, eds. (1991). Catalogue of Byzantine Seals at Dumbarton Oaks and in the Fogg Museum of Art, Volume 1: Italy, North of the Balkans, North of the Black Sea. Vol. 1. Washington, DC: Dumbarton Oaks Research Library and Collection. ISBN 0-88402-194-7.
- Острогорски, Георгије; Баришић, Фрањо, eds. (1966). Византијски извори за историју народа Југославије. Vol. 3. Београд: Византолошки институт.
- Popović, Marko (1999). Tvrđava Ras [The Fortress of Ras] (in Serbian). Belgrade: Archaeological Institute. ISBN 9788680093147.
- Samardžić, Radovan; Duškov, Milan, eds. (1993). Serbs in European Civilization. Belgrade: Nova, Serbian Academy of Sciences and Arts, Institute for Balkan Studies. ISBN 978-86-7583-015-3.
- Stephenson, Paul (2003). The Legend of Basil the Bulgar-Slayer. Cambridge: Cambridge University Press. ISBN 978-0-521-81530-7.
- Stephenson, Paul (2004) [2000]. Byzantium's Balkan Frontier: A Political Study of the Northern Balkans, 900–1204. Cambridge University Press. ISBN 978-0-521-77017-0.
- Stephenson, Paul (2008). "Balkan borderlands (1018–1204)". In Shepard, Jonathan (ed.). The Cambridge History of the Byzantine Empire c.500-1492. Cambridge University Press. pp. 664–691. ISBN 9780521832311.
- Stojkovski, Boris (2020). "Byzantine military campaigns against Serbian lands and Hungary in the second half of the eleventh century.". In Theotokis, Georgios; Meško, Marek (eds.). War in Eleventh-Century Byzantium. Routledge. ISBN 978-0-429-57477-1.
- Šćekić, Radenko; Leković, Žarko; Premović, Marijan (2015). "Political Developments and Unrests in Stara Raška (Old Rascia) and Old Herzegovina during Ottoman Rule". Balcanica (46): 79–106. doi:10.2298/BALC1546079S.
- Thurn, Hans, ed. (1973). Ioannis Scylitzae Synopsis historiarum. Berlin-New York: De Gruyter. ISBN 978-3-11-002285-8.
- Whittow, Mark (1996). The Making of Orthodox Byzantium, 600–1025. Basingstoke: Macmillan. ISBN 978-1-349-24765-3.
- Живковић, Тибор (2002). Јужни Словени под византијском влашћу 600–1025 (South Slavs under the Byzantine Rule 600–1025). Београд: Историјски институт САНУ, Службени гласник. ISBN 978-86-7743-027-6.
- Živković, Tibor (2008). Forging unity: The South Slavs between East and West 550–1150. Belgrade: The Institute of History, Čigoja štampa. ISBN 978-86-7558-573-2.
