= Music of Macedonia (Greece) =

Overview of music traditions in Macedonia

The music of the Greek region of Macedonia forms part of the broader musical tradition of the Greek mainland and of the southern Balkans. Compared to other regions of Greece, the music of Macedonia is characterized by a high degree of diversity, due to the numerous influences it has received over the years from neighboring countries and particularly from refugees arriving in the early 20th century. In general terms, Macedonian music can be thought of as the connecting chain between the Western musical tradition of Epirus and Thessaly and the Eastern musical tradition of Thrace and Constantinople.

Macedonian music is known for its tradition of patriotic folk songs, including klepht songs and songs that make references to the Macedonian Struggle. It is also notable for the use of brass instruments (called chálkina), trumpets, tympana and koudounia. Other instruments used include clarinet, violin and Macedonian lyra.

Folk dances from Macedonia include the Macedonia, Hasapiko and Syrtaki (found allover Greece), Leventikos, Endeka Kozanis, Stankena, Akritikos, Baidouska, Macedonikos antikristos, Kori Eleni, Partalos, Kleftikos Macedonikos, Mpougatsas, Kastorianos, O Nikolos, Antikrystos, Sirtos Macedonias, Zeibekiko and Kapitan Louka.

Macedonia and especially its capital, Thessaloniki, maintain a thriving music scene and have been home to many of Greece's most prominent popular musicians of singers, including Marinella, Stavros Kouyioumtzis, Giannis Kalatzis, Paschalis Terzis, Natassa Theodoridou, Antonis Remos, Nikos Papazoglou, Giannis Aggelakas, as well as bands such as Onirama, Xylina Spathia, Trypes and Nightrage.

== History ==
Excavations in Macedonia have discovered musical instruments similar to the aulos as early as the Neolithic Era and throughout classical antiquity. The Ancient Macedonians enjoyed similar music to the rest of the Ancient Greeks and Alexander the Great and his successors built odea for musical performances in every city they built, from Alexandria in Egypt to cities as distant as Ai-Khanoum in what is now modern-day Afghanistan.

Macedonian songs are in particular influenced by the Acritic Byzantine tradition, while instruments such as the tambourine, the Macedonian lyra and the Macedonian bagpipe are directly descended from medieval Greek equivalents. Many local dances such as Syrtos have also been danced to similar music for hundreds of years.

Modern Macedonian music is an admixture of the music of pre-20th century Greek Macedonians, which has some similarities to the music of neighboring Epirus and Thessaly, such as the music of Greek refugees from Asia Minor, who arrived following the Asia Minor disaster.

== Regional variation ==
Western Macedonian music is the closest to that of Thessaly and Epirus and is dominated by brass instruments, with the exception of Grevena and the surrounding area, where the Epirot orchestra (clarinet, violin, laouto and tambourine) is more common. Grevena is also known for its folk and Acritic songs traditionally sung by women without accompanying instruments to celebrate Easter. These songs date back to the Middle Ages and were passed down over the centuries among the then largely illiterate rural population. A similar tradition is found in the historically Greek-speaking villages of the western and southern parts of Kozani. The cities of Kozani and Kastoria follow a separate tradition of urban songs, which survive until this day.

A rich brass tradition also evolved in Pella and Kilkis, replacing the earlier zurna (karamuza) and bagpipe bands, which still dominate Imathia and much of Central and Eastern Macedonia. In Naoussa and the surrounding area, traditional orchestras consist of the famous davul and zurna combination, while Veria is known for its Ottoman-style urban music. In mountainous Pieria, the dominant instrument was the gaida, while Chalkidike, due to its tradition of sea-faring trade, shares more in common with the music of the Aegean islands, the dominant instruments there being the violin and the laouto.

Nearer the border with North Macedonia and particularly in Florina, songs such as Leventikos and associated dances are shared between Greek and Slavic speakers, with the same songs often having lyrics in both languages.

== Folk songs ==
- My white doves (Ασπρα μου περιστέρια) - love song
- Oh, that the mountains had been lowered (Ας χαμήλωναν τα βουνά) - love song
- A lady called me (Με μήνυσε μια αρχόντισσα) - love song
- Famous Macedonia (military march from the Balkan Wars adapted from the traditional 'Macedonian dance', itself a derivation of an Acritic song, written in iambic decapentasyllabic - today serves as the anthem of the region of Macedonia)
- They will never take the Macedonians' land (Δεν θα την πάρουνε ποτέ την γη των Μακεδόνων) - patriotic song from Balkan Wars
- Tzouvanaki: wedding song from Thessaloniki
- We were three brothers: wedding song from Thessaloniki
- Lenio: local "butcher's song" from Assiros
- The quiet one: wedding dance
- Sultana: song from Pylaia
- Konstantinos: old folk song from Ossa, Thessaloniki
- As many mountains as I passed: lounge song
- Mother, a silver klontiri: wedding song from Serres
- They put me in prison: Table song from Draviskos, Serres
- Bulgarian women go up: Song from Serres
- The castle of Mourias: Byzantine folk song from Kastanochori, Serres
- Turks in Toumba: Slavic language song from Florina
- Oh, Royal Tree: Lament from Eratyra about the Fall of Constantinople

== Folk dances ==
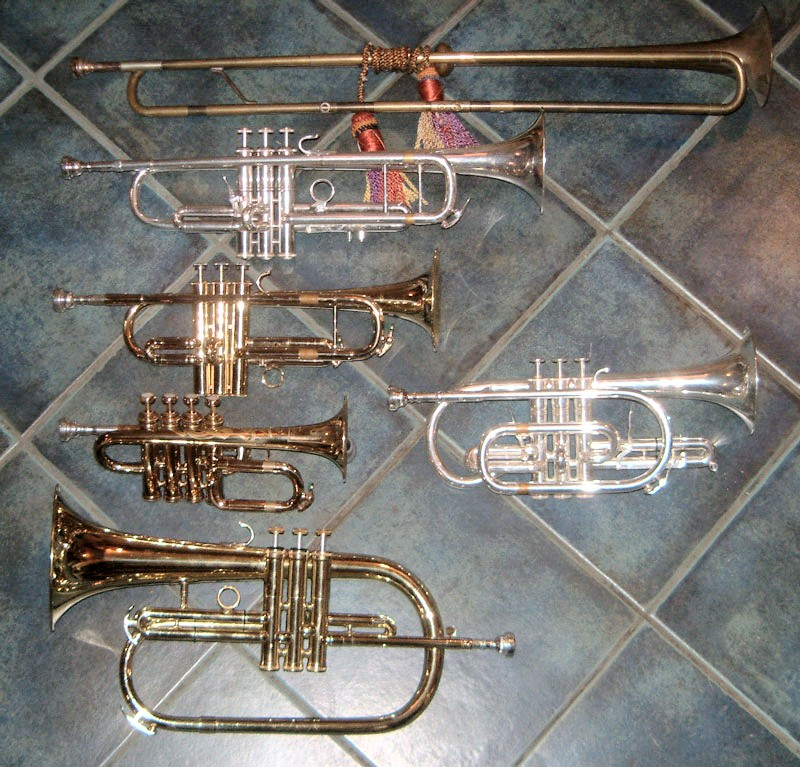
The use of brass instruments (chálkina) is notable in the music of the region

Folk dances in the Macedonian region of Greece include:

- Akritikos
- Baidouska
- Endeka Kozanis
- Kastorianos
- Leventikos
- Makedonia (dance)
- Makedonikos antikristos
- Kori Eleni (Eleno Mome)
- O Nikolos
- Partalos
- Proskinitos
- Syrtos
- Tsamiko
- Zaharoula

== See also ==
- Music of North Macedonia
- Music of Southeastern Europe
