= Macedonian conjugation =

Inflection of verbs in the Macedonian language

Macedonian conjugation (Macedonian: конјугација) is the creation of derived forms of a Macedonian verb from its principal parts by inflection.

Macedonian verbs are conventionally divided into three main conjugations according to the thematic vowel used in the citation form (i.e. 3p-pres-sg):

- а–group (e.g. вика, бега);
- и–group — further divided into three subgroups according to the thematic vowel in the 1p-aor-sg:
  - и–subgroup (прати—пратив, направи—направив),
  - е–subgroup (остари—остарев, оздрави—оздравев),
  - а–subgroup (стои—стојав, лежи—лежов).
- е–group — further divided into four subgroups according to the thematic vowel in the 1p-aor-sg:
  - а–subgroup (викне—викнав, падне—паднав),
  - е–subgroup (умре—умрев, задре—задрев),
  - о–subgroup (пече—пеков, сече—секов),
  - ∅–subgroup (i.e. with an athematic stem; пие—пив, трие—трив).

Futurity is expressed by placing the invariable particle ќе before a verb phrase.

== Synthetic series ==
The synthetic series consists of three simple tenses—the present, imperfect and aorist—and the imperative mood.

=== Present tense ===
Citation form	Stem	Present Tense (а–group)					
Citation form	Stem	Singular			Plural		
Citation form	Stem	1st person	2nd person	3rd person	1st person	2nd person	3rd person
вика	вик–	викам	викаш	вика	викаме	викате	викаат
бега	бег–	бегам	бегаш	бега	бегаме	бегате	бегаат

Citation form	Stem	Present Tense (и–group)					
Citation form	Stem	Singular			Plural		
Citation form	Stem	1st person	2nd person	3rd person	1st person	2nd person	3rd person
носи	нос–	носам	носиш	носи	носиме	носите	носат
учи	уч–	учам	учиш	учи	учиме	учите	учат
остари	остар–	остарам	остариш	остари	остариме	остарите	остарат
оздрави	оздрав–	оздравам	оздравиш	оздрави	оздравиме	оздравите	оздрават
стои	сто(и)–	стојам^{1}	стоиш	стои	стоиме	стоите	стојат^{2}
лежи	леж–	лежам	лежиш	лежи	лежиме	лежите	лежат

^{1, 2} The syllabic thematic vowel и changes to the non-syllabic ј when preceding inflectional suffixes which begin with a vowel.

Citation form	Stem	Present Tense (е–group)					
Citation form	Stem	Singular			Plural		
Citation form	Stem	1st person	2nd person	3rd person	1st person	2nd person	3rd person
викне	викн–	викнам	викнеш	викне	викнеме	викнете	викнат
умре	умр–	умрам	умреш	умре	умреме	умрете	умрат

=== Past tenses ===
==== Imperfect ====
Citation form	Stem	Imperfect (а–group)					
Citation form	Stem	Singular			Plural		
Citation form	Stem	1st person	2nd person	3rd person	1st person	2nd person	3rd person
вика	вика–	викав	викаше	викаше	викавме	викавте	викаа
бега	бега–	бегав	бегаше	бегаше	бегавме	бегавте	бегаа

Citation form	Stem	Imperfect (и–group)					
Citation form	Stem	Singular			Plural		
Citation form	Stem	1st person	2nd person	3rd person	1st person	2nd person	3rd person
оди	оде–	одев	одеше	одеше	одевме	одевте	одеа

Citation form	Stem	Imperfect (е–group)					
Citation form	Stem	Singular			Plural		
Citation form	Stem	1st person	2nd person	3rd person	1st person	2nd person	3rd person
јаде	јаде–	јадев	јадеше	јадеше	јадевме	јадевте	јадеа

==== Aorist ====
===== а–group =====
Citation form	Stem	Aorist (а–group)					
Citation form	Stem	Singular			Plural		
Citation form	Stem	1st person	2nd person	3rd person	1st person	2nd person	3rd person
прочита	прочита–	прочитав	прочита	прочита	прочитавме	прочитавте	прочитаа

===== и–group =====
Citation form	Stem	Aorist (и–group, и–subgroup)					
Citation form	Stem	Singular			Plural		
Citation form	Stem	1st person	2nd person	3rd person	1st person	2nd person	3rd person
прати	прати–	пратив	прати	прати	пративме	пративте	пратија^{3}

^{3} An intrusive /j/ occurs between /i/ and /a/.

Citation form	Stem	Aorist (и–group, е–subgroup)					
Citation form	Stem	Singular			Plural		
Citation form	Stem	1st person	2nd person	3rd person	1st person	2nd person	3rd person
оздрави	оздраве–	оздравев	оздраве	оздраве	оздравевме	оздравевте	оздравеа

Citation form	Stem	Aorist (и–group, а–subgroup)					
Citation form	Stem	Singular			Plural		
Citation form	Stem	1st person	2nd person	3rd person	1st person	2nd person	3rd person
издржи	издржа–	издржав	издржа	издржа	издржавме	издржавте	издржаа

===== е–group =====
Citation form	Stem	Aorist (е–group, а–subgroup)					
Citation form	Stem	Singular			Plural		
Citation form	Stem	1st person	2nd person	3rd person	1st person	2nd person	3rd person
стане	стана–	станав	стана	стана	станавме	станавте	станаа

Citation form	Stem	Aorist (е–group, е–subgroup)					
Citation form	Stem	Singular			Plural		
Citation form	Stem	1st person	2nd person	3rd person	1st person	2nd person	3rd person
сотре	сотре–	сотрев	сотре	сотре	сотревме	сотревте	сотреа

Citation form	Stem	Aorist (е–group, о–subgroup)					
Citation form	Stem	Singular			Plural		
Citation form	Stem	1st person	2nd person	3rd person	1st person	2nd person	3rd person
дојде	дојд–	дојдов	дојде	дојде	дојдовме	дојдовте	дојдоа

Citation form	Stem	Aorist (е–group, ∅–subgroup)					
Citation form	Stem	Singular			Plural		
Citation form	Stem	1st person	2nd person	3rd person	1st person	2nd person	3rd person
измие	изми–	измив	изми	изми	измивме	измивте	измија^{4}

^{4} An intrusive /j/ occurs between /i/ and /a/.

=== Imperative mood ===
Citation form	Stem	Imperative (а–group)					
Citation form	Stem	Singular			Plural		
Citation form	Stem	1st person	2nd person	3rd person	1st person	2nd person	3rd person
вика	вик–	—	викај	—	—	викајте	—
бега	бег–	—	бегај	—	—	бегајте	—

Citation form	Stem	Imperative (и–group)					
Citation form	Stem	Singular			Plural		
Citation form	Stem	1st person	2nd person	3rd person	1st person	2nd person	3rd person
носи	нос–	—	носи	—	—	носете	—
учи	уч–	—	учи	—	—	учете	—

Citation form	Stem	Imperative (е–group)					
Citation form	Stem	Singular			Plural		
Citation form	Stem	1st person	2nd person	3rd person	1st person	2nd person	3rd person
викне	викн–	—	викни	—	—	викнете	—
умре	умр–	—	умри	—	—	умрете	—

== Non-finite series ==
The non-finite series consists of the verbal л-form, verbal adverb, verbal noun and verbal adjective.

- The verbal л-form occurs in two forms: one based on the imperfect stem and one based on the aorist stem. The verbal л-form inflects for gender and number.

Stem base	Verbal л-form of донесе			
Stem base	Masculine	Feminine	Neuter	Plural (all genders)
Imperfect	донел	донела	донело	донеле
Aorist	донесол	донесла	донесло	донесле

- The verbal adverb is an invariant form, based on the imperfect stem with the addition of the suffix -јќи; ex. викајќи.
- The verbal noun is based on the imperfect stem of imperfective verbs with the addition of the suffix -ње; ex. одење. The verbal noun inflects for number and case as with other nouns.
- The verbal adjective is based on the aorist stem when the stem ends in /a/. Otherwise, the imperfect stem is used. It is formed by adding -/t/ to the end of the stem where the vowel is preceded by -/n/ or -/ɲ/, otherwise -/n/ is used; for example, покани 'to invite' has the verbal adjective поканет 'invited', and дојде 'to come' has the verbal adjective дојден 'arrived'. The verbal adjective inflects for number, gender and case as with other adjectives.

== Analytic series ==
The analytic series consists of compound tenses and the conditional mood. It is further divided into the сум-series, беше-pluperfect series and има-series.

=== Сум-series ===
- The сум-aorist is formed using the present tense of сум (inflecting for person, and dropped in 3P sg. and 3P pl.) and the aorist verbal л-form.
- The сум-imperfect is formed using the present tense of сум (inflecting for person, and dropped in 3P sg. and 3P pl.) and the imperfect verbal л-form

Verb	Tense	Сум-series					
Verb	Tense	Singular			Plural		
Verb	Tense	1st person	2nd person	3rd person	1st person	2nd person	3rd person
гали	Aorist	сум галил	си галил	галил	сме галиле	сте галиле	галиле
гали	Imperfect	сум галел	си галел	галел	сме галеле	сте галеле	галеле

=== Беше-pluperfect series ===
- The беше-aorist is formed using the aorist of сум (inflecting for person) and the aorist verbal л-form.
- The беше-imperfect is formed using the imperfect of сум (inflecting for person) and the imperfect verbal л-form.

Verb	Tense	Беше-pluperfect series					
Verb	Tense	Singular			Plural		
Verb	Tense	1st person	2nd person	3rd person	1st person	2nd person	3rd person
гали	Aorist	бев галил	беше галил	беше галил	бевме галиле	бевте галиле	беа галиле
гали	Imperfect	бев галел	беше галел	беше галел	бевме галеле	бевте галеле	беа галеле

=== Има-series ===
- The има-perfect is formed using the present tense of има (inflecting for person) and the neuter sg. verbal adjective.
- The имаше-pluperfect is formed using the imperfect of има (inflecting for person) and the neuter sg. verbal adjective.
- The имал-perfect is formed using the present tense of сум (inflecting for person, and dropped in 3P sg. and 3P pl.), the verbal л-form of има and the neuter sg. verbal adjective.

Verb	Tense	Има-series					
Verb	Tense	Singular			Plural		
Verb	Tense	1st person	2nd person	3rd person	1st person	2nd person	3rd person
гали	Има-perfect	имам галено	имаш галено	има галено	имаме галено	имате галено	имаат галено
гали	Имаше-pluperfect	имав галено	имаше галено	имаше галено	имавме галено	имавте галено	имаа галено
гали	Имал-perfect	сум имал галено	си имал галено	имал галено	сме имале галено	сте имате галено	имале галено

=== Conditional mood ===
The conditional mood is formed using the invariant particle би with the verbal л-form. Imperfective and perfective verbs typically use the imperfect and aorist verbal л-forms, respectively.

== Bibliography ==
- Koneski, B. (1996), Граматика на македонскиот јазик ['A Grammar of the Macedonian Language'] (Macedonian), Skopje: Prosvetno Delo Inc.
- Friedman, V. A. (2001), Macedonian, SEELRC: Duke University.
- Lunt, H. G. (1952), A Grammar of the Macedonian Literary Language, Skopje.
- Foulon–Hristova, J. and Poposki, A. (1998), Grammaire pratique du macédonien ['A Practical Grammar of Macedonian'] (French), Paris: Langues & mondes, l'Asiatthèque.
