= Music of Macedonia =

Music of Macedonia may refer to:

- Music of North Macedonia, a sovereign state in southeastern Europe
- Music of Macedonia (Greece), a region of Greece immediately south of North Macedonia

== See also ==
- Music of Southeastern Europe
