= Macedonian language naming dispute =

Dispute over the name of South Slavic language

South Slavic language spoken in North Macedonia and some adjacent areas has been referred to using several different terms. Its native speakers, as well as the Constitution of North Macedonia, call it Macedonian language (Macedonian: македонски, makedonski). It is also the name under which the language is internationally recognized. However, for historical reasons, as well as due to the Macedonia naming dispute, several other terms of reference are used when describing or referring to the language. Some of the names use the family to which the language belongs ("Slavic", "South Slavic" or similar) to disambiguate it from the non-Slavic ancient Macedonian language, a different language in the Hellenic branch; sometimes the autonym "Makedonski" is used in English for the modern Slavic language, with "Macedonian" being reserved for the ancient language. There is also a dialect of Modern Greek called Macedonian Greek and spoken by the Greek Macedonians. Such variations in nomenclature are often due to political opposition from Greece rather than scientific or linguistic reasons, as the usage of the term Macedonian to describe the Slavic language remains dominate in academic and international circles.

On 3 June 2018, the Greek Minister of Shipping and Island Policy Panagiotis Kouroumblis, acknowledged that Greece fully recognizes the term "Macedonian language" for the modern Slavic language, since the 1977 UN Conference on the Standardization of Geographical Names, a fact confirmed on 6 June by the Greek Minister for Foreign Affairs Nikos Kotzias, who stated that the language was recognized by the New Democracy-led government of that time. Kotzias also revealed classified documents confirming the use of the term "Macedonian Language" by the past governments of Greece, as well as pointing out to official statements of the Greek Prime Minister Evangelos Averoff who in 1954 and 1959 used the term "Macedonian language" to refer to the South Slavic language. New Democracy denied these claims, noting that the 1977 UN document states clearly that the terminology used thereof (i.e. the characterization of the languages) does not imply any opinion of the General Secretariat of the UN regarding the legal status of any country, territory, borders etc. Further, New Democracy stated that in 2007 and 2012, as governing party, included Greece's objections in the relevant UN documents. On 12 June 2018, Prime Minister of North Macedonia Zoran Zaev, announced that the recognition of the Macedonian language by Greece is reaffirmed in the Prespa agreement.

== Macedonian dialect of Modern Greek ==
“Macedonian dialect of modern Greek” is a Greek dialect spoken in most of northern Greece, particularly in the rural areas of Macedonia. It is fully intelligible with other Greek dialects. The dialect is usually referred as Makedonika (Greek: Μακεδονικά, Makedoniká, "Macedonian") or Makedonitika (Μακεδονίτικα, Makedonítika, "Macedonitic").

== Macedonian Slavic ==
The term "Macedonian Slavic" also includes variants such as "Macedonian Slav", "Slavic Macedonian", "(Slavic) Macedonian", "Macedonian (Slavonic)" etc. Macedonian Slavic (Macedonian: македонски словенски, makedonski slovenski) is listed by Ethnologue as an alternative name for the Macedonian language, along with simply "Slavic" (see section on Slavomacedonian below). As of 2004, Eurominority reports that the Council of Europe uses the term "Macedonian (Slavic)" to refer to the Macedonian language.

In his book Can Threatened Languages be Saved? (2000, ed. Joshua A. Fishman), Australian linguist Michael Clyne states that in 1994, the state government of Victoria "bowed to pressure from Greek diplomatic representatives and sections of the Greek community" by declaring that the Macedonian language should be referred to as "Macedonian (Slavonic)"; that in 1997, the ethnic Macedonian community appealed to the Human Rights and Equal Opportunity Commission but that the appeal was unsuccessful; that in 1998, the community appealed to the Supreme Court and that the decision was overturned; and that the state government then made an appeal but that the verdict was affirmed in 2000.

== Slavomacedonian ==
The term Slavomacedonian (Cyrillic script: славомакедонски, Greek: Σλαβομακεδονικά) was introduced in Greece in the 1940s. A native of Greek Macedonia, a pioneer of ethnic Macedonian schools in the region and local historian, Pavlos Koufis, says:

[During its Panhellenic Meeting in September 1942, the KKE mentioned that it recognises the equality of the ethnic minorities in Greece] the KKE recognised that the Slavophone population was ethnic minority of Slavomacedonians. This was a term, which the inhabitants of the region accepted with relief. [Because] Slavomacedonians = Slavs+Macedonians. The first section of the term determined their origin and classified them in the great family of the Slav peoples.

Although acceptable in the past, current use of this name in reference to both the ethnic group and the language can be considered pejorative and offensive by ethnic Macedonians. The Greek Helsinki Monitor reports,

... the term Slavomacedonian was introduced and was accepted by the community itself, which at the time had a much more widespread non-Greek Macedonian ethnic consciousness. Unfortunately, according to members of the community, this term was later used by the Greek authorities in a pejorative, discriminatory way; hence the reluctance if not hostility of modern-day Macedonians of Greece (i.e. people with a Macedonian national identity) to accept it.

The term was initially used by the EBLUL to refer to both the Slavic-speaking (a.k.a. slavophone) minority of the Greek region of Macedonia, and the majority ethnic group of North Macedonia. Use of the term was later discontinued, but references to the Slavic people and Slavic minority were retained on the EBLUL website. Commenting on the name change, the Greek Helsinki Monitor said it hoped the decision would be shared by EBLUL with the Greek media and authorities:

...in the hope that, at long last, they respect the use of the name of the language (and the corresponding people) chosen by its users and unanimously accepted by the international scholarly and NGO community, as well as by many intergovernmental fora.

== FYRO Macedonian ==
The terms "FYRO Macedonian" and "Macedonian (FYROM)" have been used by the Microsoft corporation in its Windows software. In 2003, Metamorphosis, an NGO registered in the Republic of Macedonia reported that Mr. Goran Radman, General Manager of Microsoft Adriatics (the region including all ex-Yugoslav countries and Albania) explained that Microsoft would "correct the 'mistake' regarding its attitude towards the Macedonian identity", such as using constructs like 'FYRO Macedonian' instead of 'Macedonian' as the name of the language in its publications. The report stated that this came about as the result of a deal between Microsoft and the government of the Republic of Macedonia. As of today, Microsoft simply uses 'Macedonian' in reference to the Slavic language.

== Slavic dialect of the State of Skopje ==
This phrase was used in print by Nicholas P. Andriotis, professor of Linguistics at the Aristotle University of Thessaloniki. Chapter VI of his book, The Federative Republic of Skopje and its Language (Athens, 1966), is entitled "The impact of the Greek Language on the Slavic Dialect of the State of Skopje". His choice of descriptors for the language reflects Greek objections both to the use of the term 'Macedonian' to designate the language of the North Macedonia, and to the use of the term 'Macedonia' to designate the state.

== Macedonian literary language ==
This term is used by experts working within the field of Slavic linguistics to refer to the standardised language developed in Communist Yugoslavia after 1944. The term has notably been used in the title of Harvard professor Horace Lunt's A Grammar of the Macedonian Literary Language published in 1952 and sponsored by the Yugoslav ministry of Science, which was the first English-language grammar of the Macedonian language.

== See also ==
- Centre for the Macedonian Language in Greece
- European Bureau for Lesser-Used Languages
- Macedonia naming dispute
- Political views on the Macedonian language
- Slavic language (Greece)
