= Macedonian anthem =

Macedonian anthem or anthem of Macedonia can refer to:

- "Denes nad Makedonija" ('Today over Macedonia'), the national anthem of North Macedonia
- "Famous Macedonia" (Makedonia Ksakousti), unofficial regional anthem of Greek Macedonia
