= Modern history of Macedonia (Greece) =

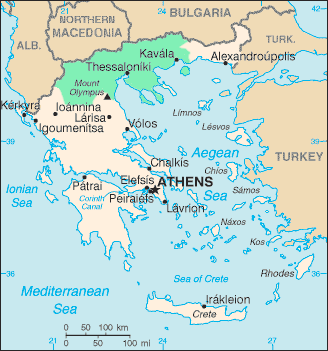
Macedonia's location in Greece

In the 19th century, the national revival in the Balkans began; national and religious antagonism flared, and conflict was heightened by the Ottoman policy of playing one group against the other. Meanwhile, the Ottoman Empire lost control over the major sections of Greece, Serbia, and Bulgaria, each of which claimed Macedonia on historical or ethnical grounds.

In the Treaty of San Stefano (1878), which terminated the Russo-Turkish War of 1877–78, Bulgaria was awarded much of Macedonia. However, the settlement was nullified by the European powers in the same year (see Congress of Berlin), and Macedonia was left under direct Ottoman control.

After the Greco-Turkish war of 1897, which proved a disaster for Greece, Bulgarian nationalism started strengthening in Macedonia. On the feast day (20 July) of the prophet Elijah in 1903 there was an uprising, known as the Ilinden Uprising, which the Ottoman army soon suppressed.

== Greek Struggle for Macedonia ==
The rising, however, made plain the danger that Macedonia might be lost for ever, which stimulated a general mobilisation on the part of the Greeks. So it came about, in 1904, that the armed Greek Struggle for Macedonia began, lasting until 1908. During this period, units made up of volunteers from the free Greek state, from Crete and from other areas poured into region of Macedonia in solidarity with the local Makedonomáchoi (Greek: Μακεδονομάχοι, "Macedonian fighters"). Together, they confronted the Bulgarian forces in an attempt to assert hegemony over the central and southern parts of Macedonia.

== Balkan Wars ==
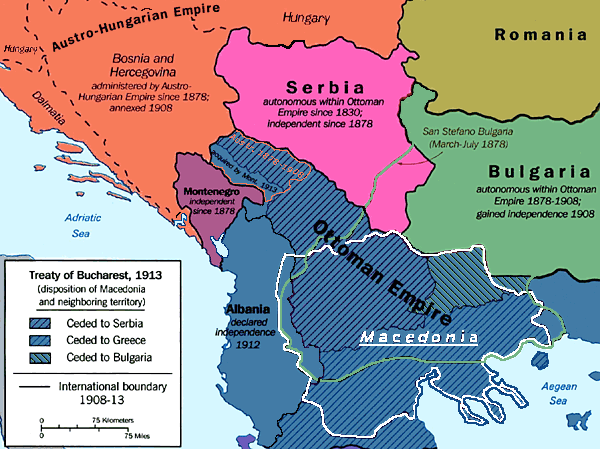
Macedonia's division in 1913

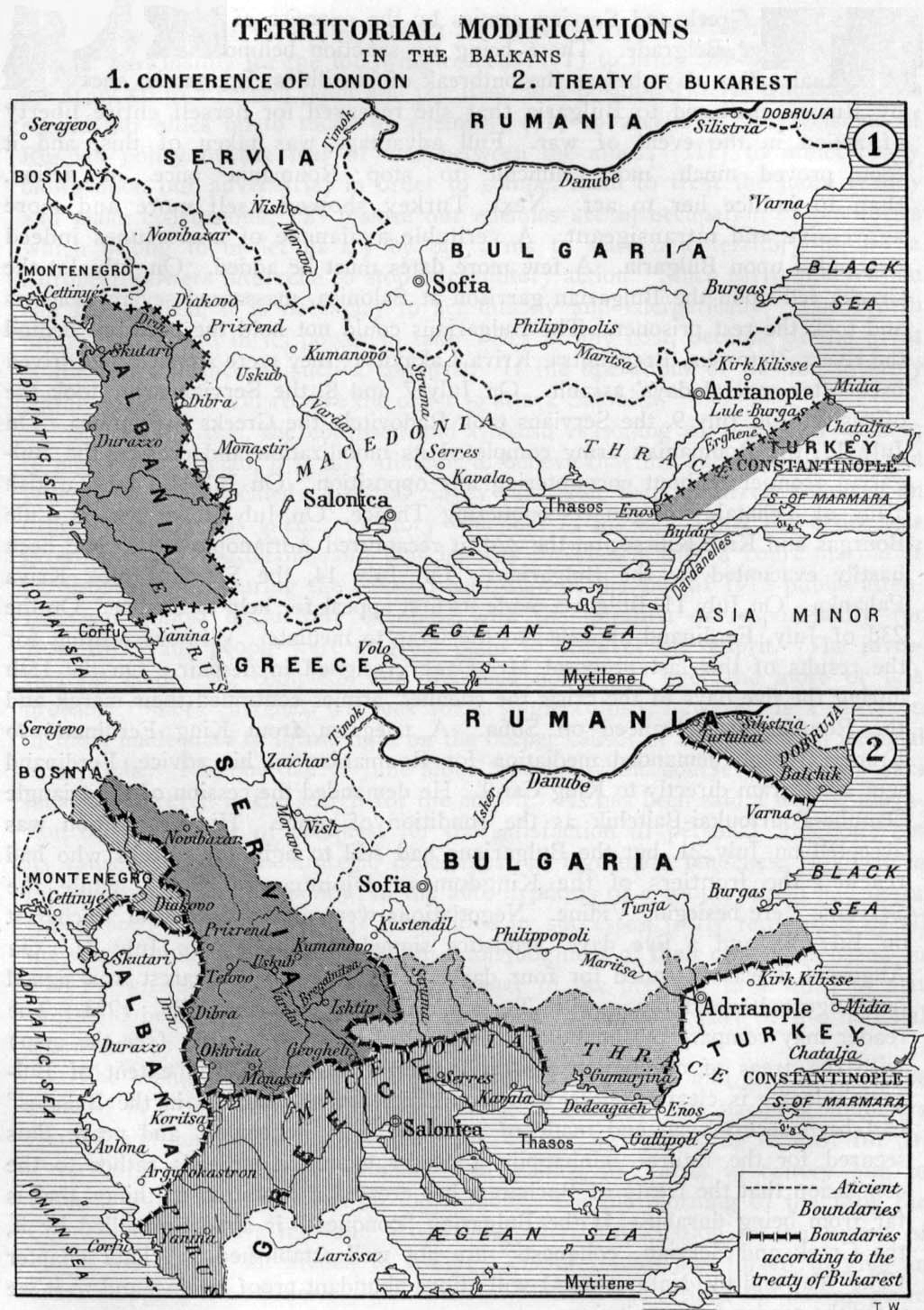
Boundaries on the Balkans after the First and the Second Balkan War (1912–1913)

The Balkan Wars (First and Second), of 1912–13 put an end to five centuries of Ottoman domination in Macedonia.

=== First Balkan War ===
The antagonisms between the Christian states (Serbia, Montenegro, Greece and Bulgaria) still persisted, and after the successful conclusion of the First Balkan War, they resurfaced, especially over the partition of Macedonia. In Treaty of London, 1913 the allies (see:Balkan League) disagree about the division of Macedonia.

=== Second Balkan War ===
Greece and Serbia turned against Bulgaria in the Second Balkan War, and the Treaty of Bucharest (1913) left Bulgaria only a small share of Macedonia, the rest of which was divided roughly along the present lines.

In 1913, following the Treaty of Bucharest, the region was divided among Greece, which took Greek Macedonia (composed from the Vilayets of Salonica, and Manastir); Serbia, which took Vardar Macedonia (today, the Republic of North Macedonia); and the areas of Ottoman Kosovo that were part of the Macedonian region – today, South Kosovo. Bulgaria took what is now Blagoevgrad Province from the Salonica Vilayet. This was followed by massive population movements. Thousands of Macedonian Bulgarians fled to Bulgaria.

== World War I and National Schism ==
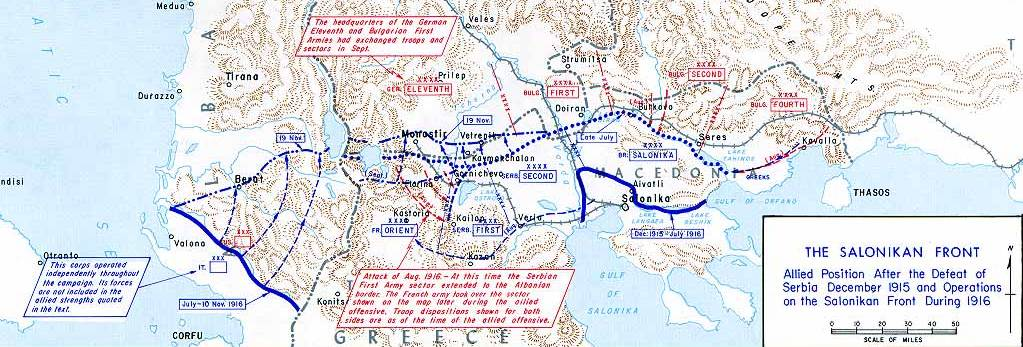
Fighting along the Greek border in Macedonia, 1916

Venizelos was in support of the Allies and wanted Greece to join the war on their side, while the pro-German King wanted Greece to remain neutral, which would favor the plans of the Central Powers. The disagreement had wider implications, since it would also affect the character and role of the king in the state. The unconstitutional dismissal of Venizelos by the King resulted in a deep personal rift between the two and in subsequent events their followers divided into two radically opposed political camps affecting the wider Greek society.

With the landing of Allied forces in Thessaloniki with Venizelos' permission and the unconditional surrender by the King of a military fort in Macedonia to German-Bulgarian forces, the disagreement of the two men started to take the form of civil war. In August 1916, followers of Venizelos set up a provisional state in Northern Greece with Entente support with the aim of reclaiming the lost regions in Macedonia, effectively splitting Greece into two entities.

After intense diplomatic negotiations and an armed confrontation in Athens between Entente and royalist forces (an incident known as Noemvriana) the king abdicated, and his second son Alexander took his place. Venizelos returned to Athens on 29 May 1917 and Greece, now unified, officially joined the war on the side of the Allies, emerging victorious and securing new territory by the Treaty of Sèvres.

== Treaty of Lausanne (1923) ==
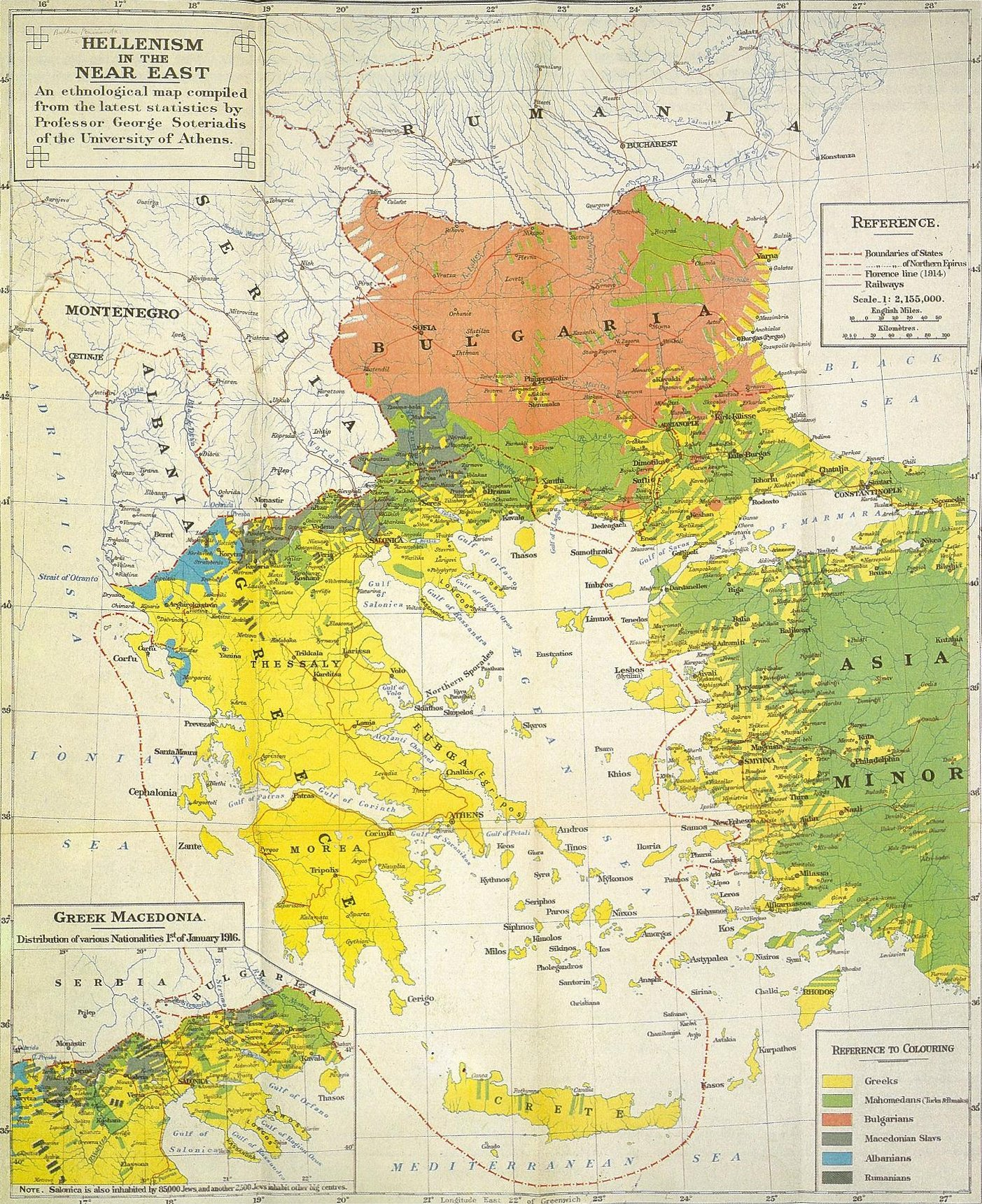
Greek ethnographic map of south-eastern Balkans before the population exchanges, 1918

The Treaty of Lausanne (1923) put an end to the traditional Greek policy of the "Great Idea". This allowed the Greek governments of the inter-war years to turn their attention to the country's domestic affairs and to the building of the modern Greek state. The population exchanges among Greece, Turkey, and Bulgaria after 1923 resulted in the replacement by Greek refugees from Asia Minor of most of the Slavic and Turkish elements in Macedonia.

Macedonia experienced a radical demographic transformation with the arrival of the Greek refugees; the Greeks, who had been the 43% in 1913, were estimated to constitute 89% of the population of Macedonia by 1928.

Bulgarian relations with Yugoslavia (before 1929 the Kingdom of Serbs, Croats and Slovenes) remained strained over the Macedonian question. Frontier incidents were frequent, as were Yugoslav charges against Bulgaria for fostering the Internal Macedonian Revolutionary Organization (IMRO), a nationalist group that used violence, in Yugoslavia. Macedonian agitation against Serbian rule culminated (1934) in the assassination of King Alexander of Yugoslavia by a Bulgarian nationalist at Marseille.

== World War II ==
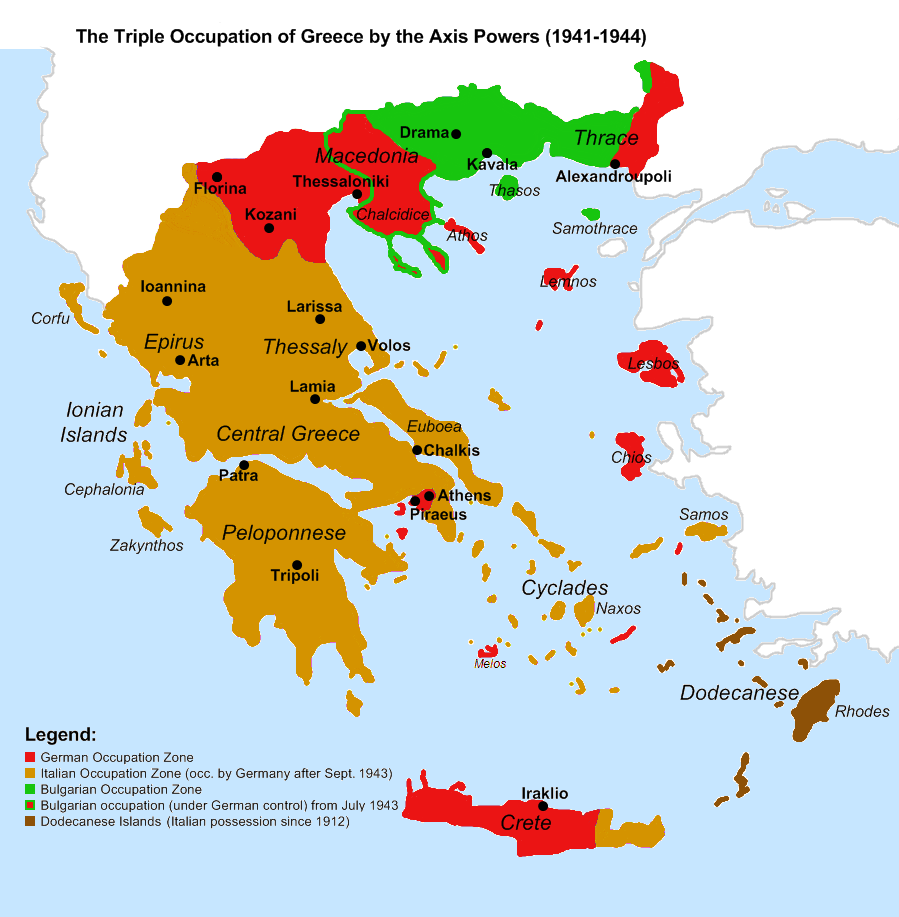
Bulgarian occupation zone in Greece during World War II

In World War II, following the Italian invasion on 28 October 1940, Greece repelled the initial Italian attack and a counter-attack in March 1941. When the German invasion, known as Operation Marita, began on 6 April, the bulk of the Greek Army was on the Greek border with Albania, then a vassal of Italy, from which the Italian troops had attacked. German troops invaded from Bulgaria, creating a second front. The Greek army found itself outnumbered in its effort to defend against both Italian and German troops. As a result, the Metaxas defensive line was quickly overrun by the Germans, who then outflanked the Greek forces at the Albanian border, forcing their surrender. Greece's territory was divided into occupation zones run by the Axis powers, with the Germans proceeding to administer the most important regions of the country themselves, including Thessaloniki. Other regions of the country were given to Germany's partners, Italy and Bulgaria. Thrace and eastern Macedonia were occupied (1941–44) by Bulgaria, which sided with the Axis Powers.

The occupation ruined the Greek economy and brought about terrible hardships for the Greek civilian population. At the same time the Greek Resistance was formed in Macedonia as well as in the rest of Greece. These resistance groups launched guerrilla attacks against the occupying powers, fought against the collaborationist Security Battalions, and set up large espionage networks. The Greek Resistance killed 21,087 Axis soldiers (17,536 Germans, 2,739 Italians, 1,532 Bulgarians) and captured 6,463 (2,102 Germans, 2,109 Italians, 2,252 Bulgarians), for the death of 20,650 Greek partisans and an unknown number captured.

=== Greek Civil War ===
Much of the Greek Civil War was fought in Macedonia. The Communist Party of Greece or KKE and the Democratic Army of Greece or DSE were heavily established in Macedonia. The National Liberation Front was established by Slavic speakers who associate themselves with Yugoslavia who resided in Greece, to assist with the war effort, in return for minority status recognition and rights. However, when the DSE lost the Greek Civil War thousands of people who fought for the Communist side fled Greece, taking thousands of ethnic Macedonian children from the Greek region of Macedonia with them.

Tension over the region of Macedonia continued in the early postwar years. During the Greek Civil War there was much conflict between Greece and Yugoslavia over Macedonia, and the breach between Yugoslavia and Bulgaria after 1948 helped to make the Macedonian question explosive. However, with the settlement of the civil war and with the easing of Yugoslav-Bulgarian relations after 1962, tension over Macedonia was reduced. A 1982 amnesty law stated "Free to return to Greece are all Greeks by Genus who during the civil war of 1946–1949 and because of it have fled abroad as political refugees, despite that Greek citizenship has been taken away from them" had the right as Greeks, to take back their Greek citizenship and return, including the Macedonian Greeks, but excluding those who identified as non-Greeks, who were mainly ethnic Macedonians.

== Macedonia today ==
Today Macedonia (Greek: Μακεδονία, Makedonia) is Greece's largest geographical region and it occupies the northern part of the country.

Since the administrative reform of 1987, the region is subdivided into three Regions:

- West Macedonia, occupies the west section of Macedonia including the regional units of Kastoria, Florina, Kozani and Grevena.
- Central Macedonia, occupies the central section of Macedonia including the regional units of Thessaloniki, Chalkidiki, Imathia, Pieria, Pella, Kilkis and Serres.
- and East Macedonia and Thrace, occupies the east section of Macedonia (two regional units of which are in Macedonia and the other regional units are in Thrace) including the regional units of Drama and Kavala.

The geographical region of Macedonia also includes the male-only autonomous monastic republic of Mount Athos.

== See also ==
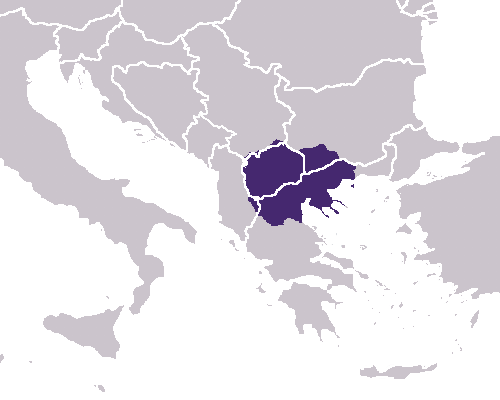
The Macedonia region imposed on modern borders.

- History of modern Greece
- Macedonia (Greece)
- Macedonia (ancient kingdom)
- Demographic History of Macedonia
- History of Macedonia (ancient kingdom)
- History of the Republic of North Macedonia
- Macedonia
- Macedonians (Greeks)
- Macedonians (ethnic group)
- Macedonian Question
- Macedonia (terminology)
