= Macedonia (terminology) =

Use of the name 'Macedonia'

The name Macedonia is used in a number of competing or overlapping meanings to describe geographical, political and historical areas, languages and peoples in a part of south-eastern Europe. It has been a major source of political controversy since the early 20th century. The situation is complicated because different ethnic groups use different terminology for the same entity, or the same terminology for different entities, with different political connotations.

Historical Macedonia

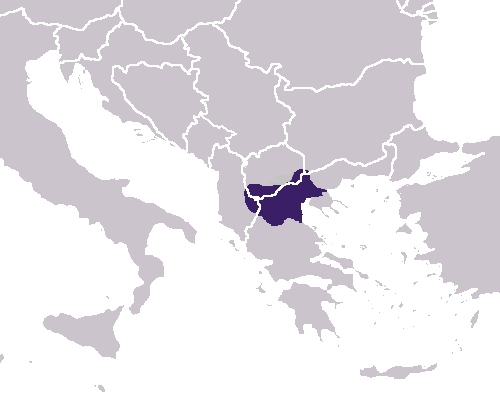
Kingdom of Macedon

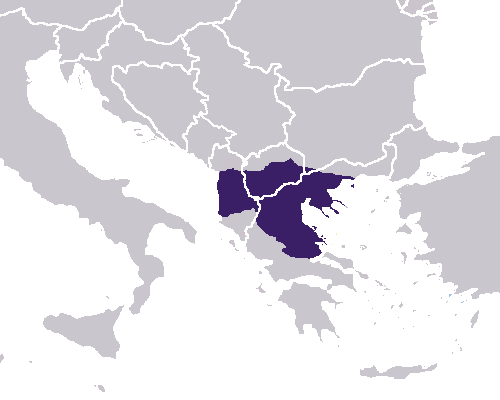
Roman province

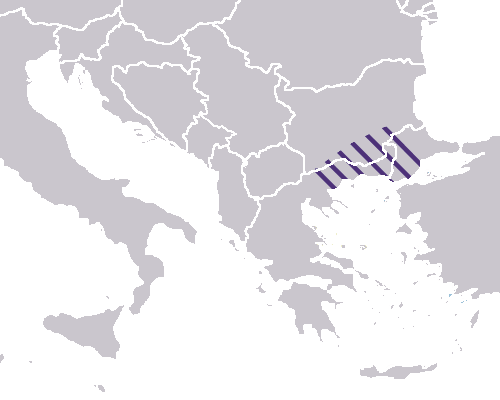
Byzantine theme

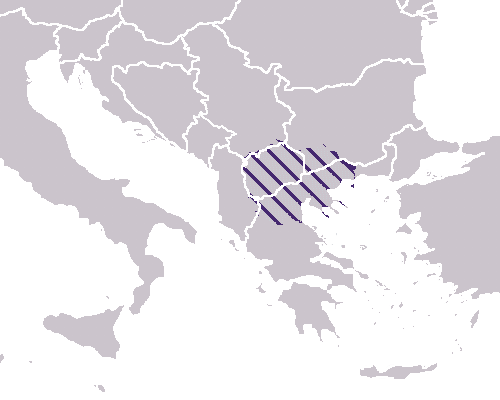
Late Ottoman period

- Macedon: Approximate borders of the ancient kingdom c. 360 BC, before expansion under Philip II, according to archaeological findings and historic references.
- Roman province: Macedonia occupied areas outside the contemporary geographical area to the West (approximate borders of maximum extent). There was also a later diocese of Macedonia.
- Byzantine province: Theme of Macedonia excluded North Macedonia, Western Macedonia and most of Central Macedonia, and occupied only the Eastern part of the contemporary Greek Macedonia (approximate borders).
- Ottoman period: Macedonia did not exist as an administrative division of the Ottoman Empire (approximate borders). During the first four centuries of the Ottoman period, western scholars thought of Macedonia in terms of Greco-Roman geography. In the early 19th century, the definition of Macedonia by most scholars, approximately matched the contemporary region, with occasional variations.

Historically, the region has presented markedly shifting borders across the Balkan peninsula. Geographically, no single definition of its borders or the names of its subdivisions is accepted by all scholars and ethnic groups. Demographically, it is mainly inhabited by four ethnic groups, three of which self-identify as Macedonians: two, a Bulgarian and a Greek one at a regional level, while a third ethnic Macedonian one at a national level. Linguistically, the names and affiliations of languages and dialects spoken in the region are a source of controversy. Politically, the rights to the extent of the use of the name Macedonia and its derivatives has led to a diplomatic dispute between Greece and the then-Republic of Macedonia, now North Macedonia. After using the provisional reference of the "former Yugoslav Republic of Macedonia" (FYROM), Greece and the then-Republic of Macedonia reached an agreement that the latter would change its official name to Republic of North Macedonia. It came into effect on 12 February 2019.

== Etymology ==
The name Macedonia derives from the Greek Μακεδονία (Makedonía), a kingdom (later, region) named after the ancient Macedonians, from the Greek Μακεδόνες (Makedones), 'Macedonians', explained as having originally meant either 'the tall ones' or 'highlanders'. The word Μακεδνόν (Makednon) is first attested in Herodotus as the name which the Greek ethnos was called (which was later called Dorian) when it settled around Pindus mountain range. Makednon is related to the Ancient Greek adjective μακεδνός (makednós), meaning 'tall, slim', attested in Homer and Hesychius of Alexandria in its feminine form μακεδνή (makednē), meaning 'long, tall'. It is cognate with the words μακρός (makros, 'long, large') and μήκος (mēkos, 'length'), both deriving from the Indo-European root *mak-, meaning 'long, slender'. Linguist Robert S. P. Beekes claims that both terms are of Pre-Greek substrate origin and cannot be explained in terms of Indo-European morphology; however, De Decker argues the arguments are insufficient.

== History ==
The region of Macedonia has been home to several historical political entities, which have used the name Macedonia; the main ones are given below. The borders of each of these entities were different.

=== Early history ===
==== Ancient Macedonia ====
Macedonia or Macedon, the ancient kingdom, was located on the periphery of Archaic and Classical Greece, and later became the dominant state of Hellenistic Greece. It was centered on the fertile plains west of the Gulf of Salonica (today north-western Greece); the first Macedonian state emerged in the 8th or early 7th century BC. Its extent beyond the center varied; some Macedonian kings could not hold their capital; Philip II expanded his power until it reached from Epirus, across Thrace to Gallipoli, and from Thermopylae to the Danube. His son Alexander the Great conquered most of the land in southwestern Asia stretching from what is currently Turkey in the west to parts of India in the east. However, while Alexander's conquests are of major historical importance as having launched the Hellenistic Age, Macedon as a state had no significant territorial gains due to them. Alexander's kingdom fell apart after his death in 323 BC; several of his Successors attempted to form a kingdom for themselves in Macedonia; the kingdom formed by Antigonus Gonatas contained all the land Philip II had started with and controlled much of what is now modern Greece; it lasted until the Romans divided it into four republics in 168 BC.

==== Roman Macedonia ====
The ancient Romans had two different entities called Macedonia, at different levels. Macedonia was established as a Roman province in 146 BC. Its boundaries were shifted from time to time for administrative convenience, but during the Roman Republic and the Principate it extended west to the Adriatic and south to Central Greece.

Under Diocletian, Thessaly, including parts of West Macedonia, was split off to form a new province, and the central and southern Balkan provinces were grouped into the Diocese of Moesia. At some point in the 4th century (first securely attested in 370) this was divided into two new dioceses, the mostly Latin-speaking Diocese of Dacia in the north and the mostly Greek-speaking Diocese of Macedonia in the south. Under Constantine the Great, the western part of the province of Macedonia was also split off to form the new province of Epirus nova. After Constantine's death, the western Balkans, Macedonia included, became part of the praetorian prefecture of Illyricum.

With the exception of a short-lived division between Macedonia Prima in the south and Macedonia Salutaris in the north towards the end of the 4th century (attested only in the Notitia Dignitatum), Macedonia formed a single province until re-divided into southern and northern parts sometime in the late 5th century (the division is first securely attested in 482), although the province seems to have been reunified by 535. According to the 6th-century Synecdemus, Macedonia Prima, with Thessalonica as its capital and governed by a consularis, counted 32 cities, and Macedonia Secunda in the north, with Stobi as its capital and governed by a praeses, only eight. The approximate boundary between the two ran on a rough line from north of Bitola (which belonged to Macedonia Prima) to the area of Demir Kapija.

==== Byzantine Macedonia ====
During the 7th century, most of the Balkans were overrun by Slavic invasions, which left only the fortified towns and the coasts in the hands of the Greek-speaking Byzantine Empire. "Macedonia" was then used for a new theme in the late 8th century under Irene of Athens. Geographically however it was located in Thrace and not in Macedonia, which was under the themes of Thessalonica, Strymon and other smaller commands such as Boleron or Drougoubiteia. Themes were not named geographically and the original sense was "army". They became districts during the military and fiscal crisis of the seventh century, when the Byzantine armies were instructed to find their supplies from the locals, wherever they happened to be. Thus the Armeniac theme was considerably west of Armenia; the Thracesian Theme was in Asia Minor, not in Thrace. The Macedonian dynasty of the Byzantine Empire acquired its name from its founder, Basil I the Macedonian, an Armenian by descent, who was born in the theme of Macedonia.

The interior of Macedonia remained in Slavic and later Bulgarian hands until the campaigns of Basil II, which ended the existence of the Bulgarian state and extended Byzantine authority across the central and northern Balkans. Thereafter Macedonia remained under Byzantine control until the Fourth Crusade (1204). A short-lived Latin Kingdom of Thessalonica was established which survived until 1224, when it was captured by Epirus. Most of Macedonia then came under the control of the Empire of Nicaea in 1246, although its northern regions remained disputed with the Serbs and the Bulgarians. Most of the region was conquered by the Serbs under Stephen Dushan during the Byzantine civil war of 1341–1347. Only Thessalonica and its environs remained in Byzantine hands. By the late 14th century, the Ottoman Turks in turn had conquered the region, although Thessalonica held out under Byzantine and later Venetian control until 1430.

1647 Portolan chart of the Mediterranean with Macedonia labelled

==== Ottomans and geographical Macedonia ====
The Ottomans did not keep Macedonia as an administrative unit: since 1864 parts of geographical Macedonia lay in three vilayets, which also comprised some non-Macedonian areas. The northern part was the Kosovo vilayet and then of Skopje; the Thessaloniki (south), and the Monastir Vilayet (western) were also created. This administrative division lasted until 1912–13, when Macedonia was divided among the Balkan states. In April 1903, by Sultan's decree, the term "Macedonia" was banned in all forms of official and private usage. In June 1903, the Ottoman authorities requested from the American Bible Society to replace the term "Macedonia" in the New Testament with the "vilayets of Salonica and Monastir".

=== Modern history ===
Since the early stages of the Greek Revolution, the provisional government of Greece claimed Macedonia as part of Greek national territory, but the Treaty of Constantinople (1832), which established a Greek independent state, set its northern boundary between Arta and Volos. When the Ottoman Empire started breaking apart, Macedonia was claimed by all members of the Balkan League (Serbia, Montenegro, Greece and Bulgaria), and by Romania. Under the Treaty of San Stefano that ended the Russo-Turkish War, 1877–78 the entire region, except Thessaloniki, was included in the borders of Bulgaria, but after the Congress of Berlin in 1878 the region was returned to the Ottoman Empire. The armies of the Balkan League advanced and occupied Macedonia in the First Balkan War in 1912. Because of disagreements between the allies about the partition of the region, the Second Balkan War erupted, and in its aftermath the arbitrary region of Macedonia was split into the following entities, that existed or still exist in this region:

- Macedonia (as a region of Greece) refers to three regions in northern Greece, incorporated in 1913, as a result of the Balkan Wars between the Ottoman Empire and the Balkan League.
- Macedonia (as a People's Republic within Yugoslavia) used to refer to the People's Republic of Macedonia established in 1946, later known as the Socialist Republic of Macedonia, one of the constituent republics of the Socialist Federal Republic of Yugoslavia, renamed in 1963. Between 1929 and 1941 this region was part of Vardar Banovina province in the Kingdom of Yugoslavia.
- Macedonia (as a recent sovereign state) referred (Note: The former constitutional name of the country "Republic of Macedonia" and the short name "Macedonia" when referring to the country, would be considered vexatious by most Greeks, especially inhabitants of the Greek province of Macedonia. The official reasons for this, as described by the Greek Ministry of Foreign Affairs, were: "The choice of the name Macedonia by FYROM directly raises the issue of usurpation of the cultural heritage of a neighbouring country. The name constitutes the basis for staking an exclusive rights claim over the entire geographical area of Macedonia. More specifically, to call only the Slavo-Macedonians Macedonians monopolizes the name for the Slavo-Macedonians and creates semiological confusion, whilst violating the human rights and the right to self-determination of Greek Macedonians. The use of the name by FYROM alone may also create problems in the trade area, and subsequently become a potential springboard for distorting reality, and a basis for activities far removed from the standards set by the European Union and more specifically the clause on good neighbourly relations. The best example of this is to be seen in the content of school textbooks in the Former Yugoslav Republic of Macedonia.") to the conventional short form name of the Republic of Macedonia, after the aforementioned Socialist Republic held a referendum and established its independence from Yugoslavia on 8 September 1991. On 12 February 2019 the name of the state was changed to Republic of North Macedonia following the ratification of the Prespa agreement negotiated with Greece, thus settling the Macedonia naming dispute.

== Geography ==
Macedonia (as a current geographical term) refers to a region of the Balkan peninsula in south-eastern Europe, covering some 60,000 or 70,000 square kilometers. Although the region's borders are not officially defined by any international organization or state, in some contexts, the territory appears to correspond to the basins of (from west to east) the Haliacmon (Aliákmonas), Vardar / Axios and Struma / Strymónas rivers, and the plains around Thessaloniki and Serres. (Note: For an attempt to delineate the boundaries of the region, see Kontogiorgi (2006).)

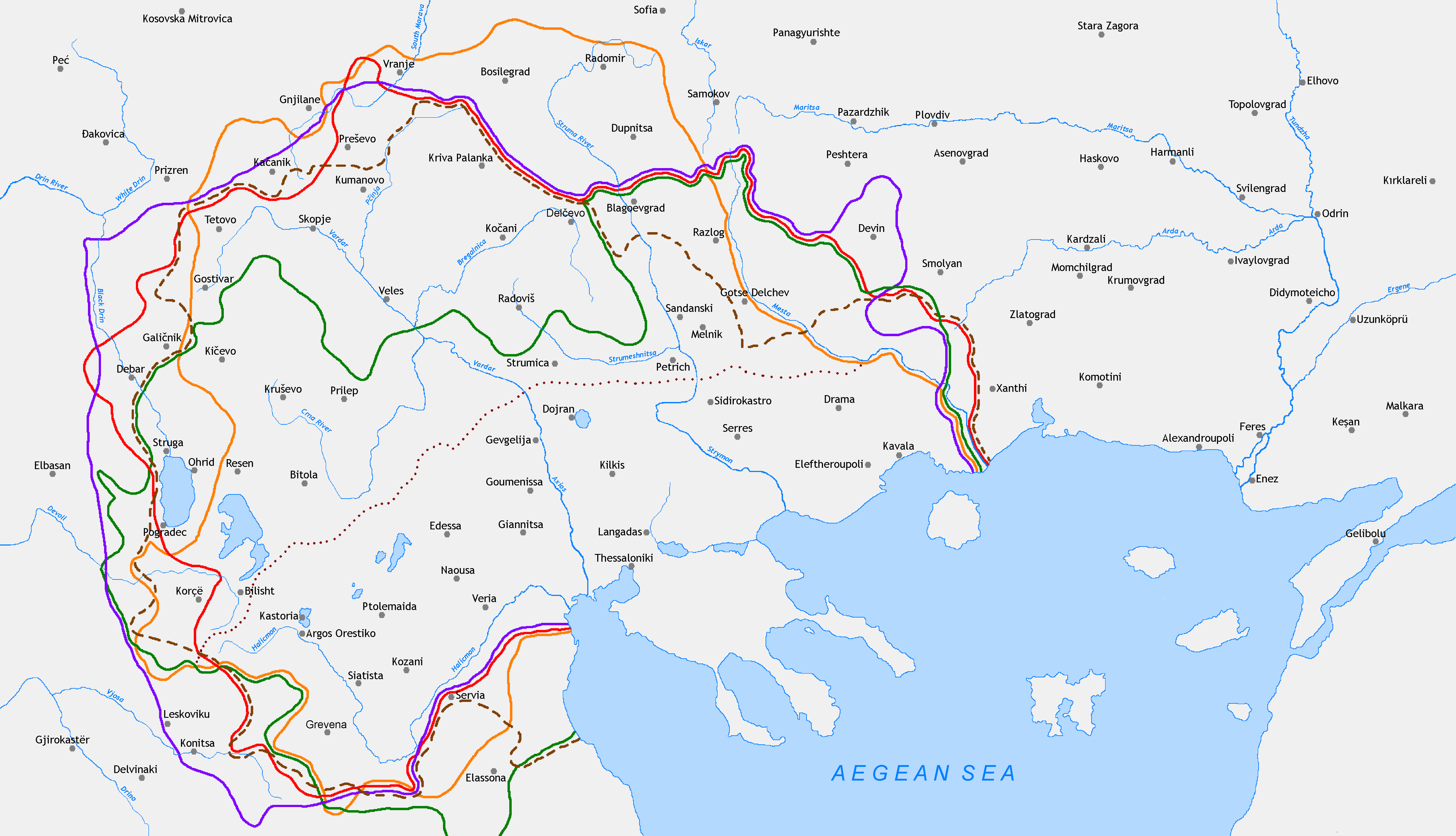
The borders of the wider region of Macedonia as portrayed by different authors between 1843 and 1927. Most maps of that period have similar borders, differing slightly from each other; a few maps restrict the region to its southern part.

In a historic context, the term Macedonia was used in various ways. Macedonia was not an administrative division of the Ottoman Empire; its entire territory was part of the beylerbeylik of Rumelia. The geographer H. R. Wilkinson suggests that the region "defies definition" but that many mappers agree "on its general location". Macedonia was well enough defined in 1897 for Gladstone to propose "Macedonia for the Macedonians"; philhellenes argued that the phrase could not be used by a man of impartiallity, while Turcophiles asserted that there are six different kinds of Macedonians, and only Turkish rule could prevail total anarchy in the region. The Balkan nations began to proclaim their rights to it after the Treaty of San Stefano in 1878 and its revision at the Congress of Berlin.

Many ethnographic maps were produced in this period of controversy; these differ primarily in the areas given to each nationality within Macedonia. This was in part a result of the choice of definition: an inhabitant of Macedonia might well have different nationalities depending on whether the basis of classification was denomination, descent, language, self-identification or personal choice. In addition, the Ottoman census, taken on the basis of religion, was misquoted by all sides; descent, or "race", was largely conjectural; inhabitants of Macedonia might speak a different language at the market and at home, and the same Slavic dialect might be called Serbian "with Bulgarian influences", Macedonian, or West-Bulgarian. (Note: For the difficulties to determine the national divisions of the population through the Ottoman census, see Jelavich (1993). For the Ottoman census and surveys about the population of Macedonia between 1882–1906, see Shaw (1977).)

These maps also differed somewhat in the boundaries given to Macedonia. Its only inarguable limits were the Aegean Sea and the Serbian and Bulgarian frontiers (as of 1885); where it bordered Old Serbia, Albania, and Thrace (all parts of Ottoman Rumelia) was debatable.

The Greek ethnographer Nicolaides, the Austrian Meinhard, and the Bulgarian Kǎnčev placed the northern boundary of Macedonia at the Šar Mountains and the Crna hills, as had scholars before 1878. The Serb Spiridon Gopčević preferred a line much further south, assigning the entire region from Skopje to Strumica to "Old Serbia"; and some later Greek geographers have defined a more restricted Macedonia. In addition, maps might vary in smaller details: as to whether this town or that was Macedonian. One Italian map included Prizren, where Nicolaides and Meinhard had drawn the boundary just south of it. On the south and west, Grevena, Korçë, and Konitsa varied from map to map; on the east, the usual line is the lower Mesta / Nestos river and then north or northwest, but one German geographer takes the line so far west as to exclude Bansko and Nevrokop / Gotse Delchev.

=== Subregions ===
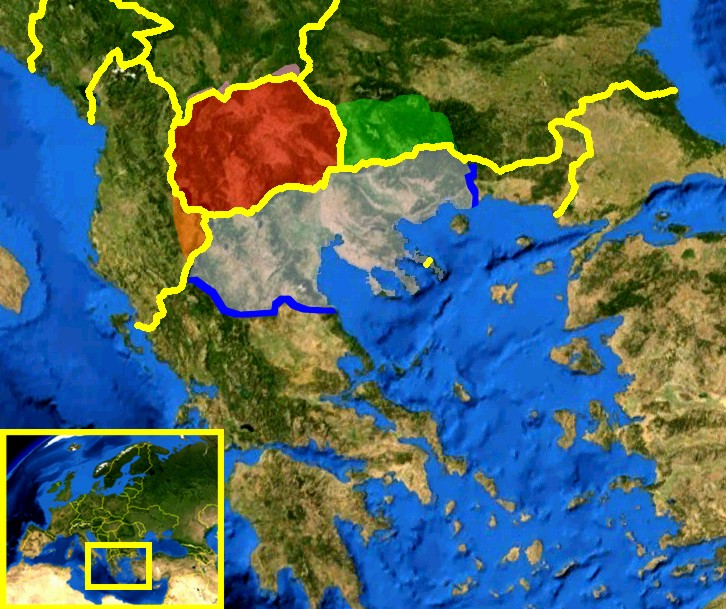
The contemporary geographical region of Macedonia is not officially defined by any international organization or state. In some contexts it appears to span six states: Albania, Bulgaria, Greece, Kosovo, the Republic of North Macedonia and Serbia Greek Macedonia (or Aegean Macedonia) Pirin Macedonia (or Bulgarian Macedonia) North Macedonia (or Vardar Macedonia) Mala Prespa and Golo Bardo Gora and Prohor Pchinski

The region of Macedonia is commonly divided into three major and two minor sub-regions. The name Macedonia appears under certain contexts on the major regions, while the smaller ones are traditionally referred to by other local toponyms.

==== Major regions ====
The region of Macedonia is commonly split geographically into three main sub-regions, especially when discussing the Macedonian Question. The terms are used in non-partisan scholarly works, although they are also used in ethnic Macedonian literature of an irredentist nature.

Greek Macedonia (or Aegean Macedonia (Note: During the Greek Civil War, in 1947, the Greek Ministry of Press and Information published a book, I Enandion tis Ellados Epivoulis ("Designs on Greece"), namely of documents and speeches on the ongoing Macedonian issue, many translations from Yugoslav officials. It reports Josip Broz Tito using the term "Aegean Macedonia" on 11 October 1945 in the buildup to the Greek Civil War; the original document is archived in 'GFM A/24581/G2/1945'. For Athens, the "new term, Aegean Macedonia", (also "Pirin Macedonia"), was introduced by Yugoslavs. Contextually, this observation indicates this was part of the Yugoslav offensive against Greece, laying claim to Greek Macedonia, but Athens does not take issue with the term itself. The 1945 date concurs with Bulgarian sources. Further information on this can be found in the article Aegean Macedonia.)) refers to an area in the south of the Macedonia region. The borders of the area are, overall, those of ancient Macedonia in Greece. It covers an area of 34,200 square kilometres (13,200 sq mi)

Pirin Macedonia (or Bulgarian Macedonia) is an area in the northeast of the Macedonia region. The borders of the area approximately coincide with those of Blagoevgrad Province in Bulgaria. It covers an area of 6,449 square kilometres (2,490 sq mi).

Vardar Macedonia (formerly Yugoslav Macedonia) is an area in the north of the Macedonia region, whose borders are those of North Macedonia. It covers an area of 25,333 square kilometres (9,781 sq mi).

==== Minor regions ====
In addition to the above-named sub-regions, there are also three smaller regions, in Albania, Kosovo and Serbia respectively. These regions are also considered geographically part of Macedonia. They are referred to by ethnic Macedonians as follows, but typically are not so referred to by non-partisan scholars.

Mala Prespa and Golo Brdo is a small area in the west of the Macedonia region in Albania, mainly around Lake Ohrid. It includes parts of the Korçë, Pogradec and Devoll districts. These districts wholly occupy about 3,000 square kilometres (1,158 sq mi), but the area concerned is significantly smaller.

Gora and Prohor Pčinjski are minor parts in the north of the Macedonia region in Albania, Kosovo and Serbia. (Note: For the conflicts between Serbs and ethnic Macedonians about the Gora region and Proho, see Bugajski (1995) and Warrander & Knaus (2007).)

== Demographics ==
The region, as defined above, has a total population of about 5 million. The main disambiguation issue in demographics is the self-identifying name of two contemporary groups. The ethnic Macedonian population of North Macedonia self-identify as Macedonian on a national level, while the Greek Macedonians self-identify as both Macedonian on a regional, and Greek on a national level. According to the Greek arguments, the ancient Macedonians' nationality was Greek and thus, the use of the term on a national level lays claims to their history. This disambiguation problem has led to a wide variety of terms used to refer to the separate groups, more information of which can be found in the terminology by group section.

Demographic Macedonia
- Macedonians c. 5 million: All inhabitants of the region, irrespective of ethnicity
- Macedonians c. 1.3 million plus diaspora: An ethnic group, more rarely referred to as Macedonian Slavs or Slavomacedonians (used mostly by Greek authorities to refer to the ethnic Macedonian minority in Greece) (Note: Although acceptable in the past, current use of the name "Slavomacedonian" in reference to both the ethnic group and the language can be considered pejorative and offensive by ethnic Macedonians living in Greece. The Greek Helsinki Monitor reports: "...the term Slavomacedonian was introduced and was accepted by the community itself, which at the time had a much more widespread non-Greek Macedonian ethnic consciousness. Unfortunately, according to members of the community, this term was later used by the Greek authorities in a pejorative, discriminatory way; hence the reluctance if not hostility of modern-day Macedonians of Greece (i.e. people with a Macedonian national identity) to accept it.")
- Macedonians c. 2.0 million: Citizens of North Macedonia irrespective of ethnicity
- Macedonians c. 2.6 million plus diaspora: An ethnic Greek regional group, also referred to as Greek Macedonians
- Macedonians (unknown population): A group of antiquity, also referred to as Ancient Macedonians.
- Macedonians c. 0.3 million: A Bulgarian regional group, also referred to as Piriners
- Macedo-Romanians c. 0.3 million: An alternative name for Aromanians and Megleno-Romanians

The self-identifying Macedonians (collectively referring to the inhabitants of the region) that inhabit or inhabited the area are:

As an ethnic group, Macedonians refers to the majority (58.4%, 2021) of the population of North Macedonia. Statistics for 2021 indicate the population of ethnic Macedonians within the country as c. 1,100,000. On the other hand, as a legal term, it refers to all the citizens of the Republic of North Macedonia, irrespective of their ethnic or religious affiliation. However, the preamble of the constitution distinguishes between "the Macedonian people" and the "Albanians, Turks, Vlachs, Romanics and other nationalities living in the Republic of Macedonia", but for whom "full equality as citizens" is provided. As of 2021 the total population of the country is 1,836,713.

As a regional group in Greece, Macedonians refers to ethnic Greeks (98%, 2001) living in regions referred to as Macedonia, and particularly Greek Macedonia. This group composes the vast majority of the population of the Greek region of Macedonia. The 2001 census for the total population of the Macedonia region in Greece shows 2,625,681.

The same term in antiquity described the inhabitants of the kingdom of Macedon, including their notable rulers Philip II and Alexander the Great who self-identified as Greeks.

As a regional group in Bulgaria, Macedonians refers to the inhabitants of Bulgarian Macedonia, who in their vast majority self-identify as Bulgarians at a national level and as Macedonians at a regional, but not ethnic level. As of 2001, the total population of Bulgarian Macedonia is 341,245, while the ethnic Macedonians living in the same region are 3,117. The Bulgarian Macedonians also self-identify as Piriners (пиринци, pirintsi) to avoid confusion with the neighboring ethnic group.

Macedo-Romanians can be used as an alternative name for Aromanians, people living throughout the southern Balkans, especially in northern Greece, Albania, North Macedonia and Bulgaria, and as an emigrant community in Northern Dobruja, Romania. According to Ethnologue, their total population in all countries is 306,237. This not very frequent appellation is the only one with the disambiguating portmanteau, both within the members of the same ethnic group and the other ethnic groups in the area. To make matters more confusing, Aromanians are often called Machedoni by Romanians, as opposed to the citizens of North Macedonia, who are called Macedoneni. "Macedo-Romanian" is also used for the Megleno-Romanians.

The ethnic Albanians living in the region of Macedonia, as defined above, are mainly concentrated in North Macedonia (especially in the northwestern part that borders Kosovo and Albania), and less in the Albanian minor sub-region of Macedonia around the Lake Ohrid. As of 2021, the total population of Albanians in North Macedonia is 446,245 or 24.3% of the country's total population.

== Linguistics ==
As language is one of the elements tied in with national identity, the same disputes that are voiced over demographics are also found in linguistics. There are two main disputes about the use of the word Macedonian to describe a linguistic phenomenon, be it a language or a dialect:

Linguistic Macedonia
- Macedonian language: A contemporary South Slavic language, also referred to as Slavomacedonian or Macedonian Slavic
- Macedonian dialect of Modern Greek: A dialect of Modern Greek, typically simply referred to as Greek, since its differences with the Greek spoken in the rest of Greece are only a few words, phrases and some features of the pronunciation
- Ancient Macedonian: A Greek dialect or Hellenic language of antiquity
- Macedo-Romanian: Another name for the Aromanian language

The classification of Ancient Macedonian is still debated. At this time it is not conclusively determined whether it was an ancient Greek dialect, either Northwest Greek or Aeolic Greek, a sister language of Ancient Greek forming a Hellenic (i.e. Greco-Macedonian) supergroup, or viewed as an Indo-European language which is a close cousin to Greek (and perhaps somewhat related to Thracian or Phrygian languages) by some older theories. The epigraphic activity and the archaeological discoveries in the Greek region of Macedonia during the last decades has brought to light documents, among which are the first texts written in Macedonian, such as the Pella curse tablet. Based on the conclusions drawn by several studies and findings, Emilio Crespo and most scholars suggest that Ancient Macedonian was a Northwest Doric dialect. Nonetheless, the volume of surviving public and private inscriptions that have been discovered shows that the main language of formal discourse and official communication in Ancient Macedonia was Attic and then Koine Greek.

Modern Macedonian language, a South Slavic language, is not related to Ancient Macedonian, except for both belonging to the Indo-European family. It is currently the subject of two major disputes. The first is over the name (alternative ways of referring to this language can be found in the terminology by group section and in the article Macedonian language naming dispute). The second dispute is over the existence of a Macedonian language distinct from Bulgarian, the denial of which is a position supported by nationalist groups, Bulgarian and other linguists and also by many ordinary Bulgarians.

Macedonian is also the name of a dialect of Modern Greek, a language of the Indo-European family. Additionally, Aromanian (or "Macedo-Romanian") is an Eastern Romance language, spoken in Southeastern Europe by the Aromanians. The Megleno-Romanians, who speak Megleno-Romanian, are also known sometimes as "Macedo-Romanians".

== Politics ==
The controversies in geographic, linguistic and demographic terms, are also manifested in international politics. Among the autonomous countries that were formed as a result of the breakup of Yugoslavia in the 1990s, was the (until then) subnational entity of the Socialist Federal Republic of Yugoslavia, by the official name of "Socialist Republic of Macedonia", the others being Serbia, Slovenia, Croatia, Bosnia and Herzegovina and Montenegro. The peaceful break-away of that nation resulted in the change of its name to "Republic of Macedonia".

Political Macedonia

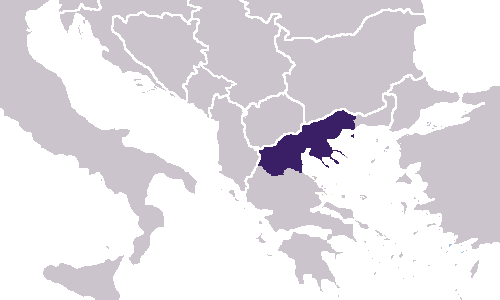
Μακεδονία (Macedonia) (Macedonia in Greece)

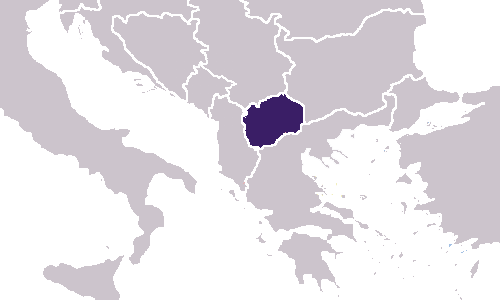
Северна Македонија (North Macedonia) (Republic of North Macedonia)

For almost three decades, Republic of Macedonia was the constitutional name of North Macedonia, the sovereign state which occupies the northern part of the geographical region of Macedonia, which roughly coincides with the geographic subregion of Vardar Macedonia. The former Yugoslav Republic of Macedonia (FYROM) was a term used for this state by the main international organisations, including the United Nations, European Union, NATO, IMF, WTO, IOC, World Bank, EBRD, OSCE, FIFA, and FIBA. The term was introduced in 1993 by the United Nations, following a naming dispute with Greece. Some countries used this term as a stop-gap measure, pending resolution of the naming dispute.

Greece and North Macedonia each considered this name a compromise: it was opposed by some Greeks for containing the Greek self-identifying name Macedonia, and by many in North Macedonia for not being the short self-identifying name. For years Greece used it in both the abbreviated (FYROM or ΠΓΔΜ) (Note: The abbreviated term "FYROM" can be considered offensive when used to refer to North Macedonia. The spellout of the term, the "former Yugoslav Republic of Macedonia", is not necessarily considered offensive, but some ethnic Macedonians may still find it offensive due to their right of self-identification being ignored. The term can also be offensive for Greeks under certain contexts, since it contains the word Macedonia.) and spellout form (Πρώην Γιουγκοσλαβική Δημοκρατία της Μακεδονίας).

The Macedonia naming dispute ended on 12 February 2019 when the two countries reached the Prespa agreement and the then-Republic of Macedonia changed its name to North Macedonia.

Macedonia refers also to a geographic region in Greece, which roughly coincides with the southernmost major geographic subregion of Macedonia. It is divided into the three administrative sub-regions (regions) of West, Central, and East Macedonia and Thrace. The region is overseen by the Ministry for Macedonia–Thrace. The capital of Greek Macedonia is Thessaloniki, which is the largest city in the region of Macedonia; Greeks often call it the "co-capital" of Greece.

=== Macedonian nationalism ===
Ethnic Macedonian irredentists following the idea of a "United Macedonia" have expressed claims to what they refer to as "Aegean Macedonia" (in Greece), "Pirin Macedonia" (in Bulgaria), "Mala Prespa and Golo Bardo" (in Albania), and "Gora and Prohor Pčinjski" (in Serbia).

Extreme Macedonian nationalists, who are concerned with demonstrating the continuity between ancient and modern Macedonians, deny they are Slavs and claim to be the direct descendants of Alexander the Great and the ancient Macedonians. Proponents of the Macedonian position have stressed that the ancient Macedonians were a distinct people of non-Greek origin. Nonetheless, North Macedonia acknowledged in the Prespa agreement that ancient Macedonians were part of the Hellenic civilization.

The moderate Macedonian position, publicly endorsed by Kiro Gligorov, the first president of the Republic of Macedonia, is modern Macedonians have no relation to Alexander the Great, but are a Slavic people whose ancestors arrived in Macedonia in the sixth century AD. In addition to affirming the existence of the Macedonian nation, Macedonians are concerned with affirming the existence of a unique Macedonian language as well. They thus emphasize that the Macedonian language has a history dating to the Old Church Slavonic used by Saints Cyril and Methodius in the 9th century.

Although ethnic Macedonians agree Macedonian minorities exist in Bulgaria and Greece and these minorities have been subjected to harsh policies of forced assimilation, there are two different positions with regard to what their future should be. These were summarized by anthropologist Loring Danforth: (Note: Most quotations within the text are from Evangelos Kofos: "Most precious jewels" from a Boston Globe article of 5 January 1993, the others from Nationalism and communism, Thessalonica, 1964.)

The goal of more extreme Macedonian nationalists is to create a "free, united, and independent Macedonia" by "liberating" the parts of Macedonia "temporarily occupied" by Bulgaria and Greece. More moderate Macedonian nationalists recognize the inviolability of the Bulgarian and Greek borders and explicitly renounce any territorial claims against the two countries. They do, however, demand that Bulgaria and Greece recognize the existence of Macedonian minorities in their countries and grant them the basic human rights they deserve.

Schoolbooks and official government publications in the Republic have shown the country as part of an "unliberated" whole, although the constitution of the Republic, especially after its amendment in 1995, does not include any territorial claims.

=== Greek nationalism ===
Danforth describes the Greek position on Macedonia as follows: because Alexander the Great and the ancient Macedonians were Greeks, and because ancient and modern Greece are bound in an unbroken line of racial and cultural continuity, it is only Greeks who have the right to identify themselves as Macedonians. According to Danforth, this is why Greeks generally refer to Ethnic Macedonians as "Skopians", a practice comparable to calling Greeks "Athenians". Danforth asserts that the negation of Macedonian identity in Greek nationalist ideology focuses on three main points: the existence of a Macedonian nation, a Macedonian language, and a Macedonian minority in Greece. More specifically, Danforth says:

From the Greek nationalist perspective there cannot be a Macedonian nation since there has never been an independent Macedonian state: the Macedonian nation is an "artificial creation", an "invention", of Tito, who "baptized" a "mosaic of nationalities" with the Greek name "Macedonians". Similarly Greek nationalists claim that because the language spoken by the ancient Macedonians was Greek, the Slavic language spoken by the "Skopians" cannot be called "the Macedonian language." Greek sources generally refer to it as "the linguistic idiom of Skopje" and describe it as a corrupt and impoverished dialect of Bulgarian. Finally, the Greek government denies the existence of a Macedonian minority in northern Greece, claiming that there exists only a small group of "Slavophone Hellenes" or "bilingual Greeks", who speak Greek and "a local Slavic dialect" but have a "Greek national consciousness".

Thus from the Greek nationalist perspective the use of the term "Macedonian" by the "Slavs of Skopje" constitutes a "felony", an "act of plagiarism" against the Greek people. Greek nationalists believe that, by calling themselves "Macedonians", the ethnic Macedonians are "stealing" a Greek name, "embezzling" Greek cultural heritage, and "falsifying" Greek history. (Note: Danforth quotes Kofos, telling a foreign reporter, "It is as if a robber came into my house and stole my most precious jewels—my history, my culture, my identity.") Greek fears that the use of the name "Macedonia" by the ethnic Macedonians will inevitably lead to the assertion of irredentist claims to territory in Greek Macedonia are heightened by fairly recent historical events. (Note: "During World War II Bulgaria occupied portions of northern Greece, while one of the specific goals of the founders of the People's Republic of Macedonia in 1944 was "the unification of the entire Macedonian nation", to be achieved by "the liberation of the other two segments" of Macedonia.")

From a different point of view, Demetrius Andreas M.-A. Floudas, of Hughes Hall, Cambridge, sums up this nationalistic reaction as follows: the Republic of Macedonia was accused of usurping the historical and cultural patrimony of Greece "in order to furnish a nucleus of national self-esteem for the new state and provide its citizens with a new, distinct, non-Bulgarian, non-Serbian, non-Albanian identity". The Republic emerged thus to Greek eyes as a country with a personality crisis, "a nondescript parasitic state" that lived off the history of its neighbours, because it allegedly lacked an illustrious past of its own, for the sake of achieving cohesion for what Greeks regarded as an "unhomogeneous little new nation".

Although generally supportive of the Greek position, Floudas criticises some elements of the Greek stance as follows:

What appeared to go unquestioned in Greece nevertheless was whether there was indeed substance in the claims of FYROM that their citizens do feel members of a distinct 'Macedonian' nationality. To answer this appropriately, neither the decades of persistent indoctrination [during Tito's time] should be left out of consideration, nor Greece's violent struggle since 1991 in contrast to her complacency for the 45 years before this. If it was a common bond that the people in Skopje wanted, they found it by claiming this name and rallying the whole population in a united resistance front under a common cause against pugnacious Greece. After this bitter and protracted struggle, even the ones in FYROM who might have not initially been infused with any distinct Macedonian ethnic identity must be feeling very Macedonian now, thanks to Greece

As of early 2008, the official position of Greece, adopted unanimously by the four largest political parties, has made a more moderate shift towards accepting a "composite name solution" (i.e. the use of the name "Macedonia" plus some qualifier), so as to disambiguate the former Yugoslav Republic from the Greek region of Macedonia and the wider geographic region of the same name.

== Names in the languages of the region ==
- Albanian: Maqedonia
- Aromanian: Machidunia/Machedonia
- Bulgarian: Македония (Makedonia)
- Greek: Μακεδονία (Makedonia)
- Ladino: Makedonia, מקדוניה
- Macedonian: Македонија (Makedonija)
- Megleno-Romanian: Machedonia
- Romany: Makedoniya
- Serbian: Македонија, Makedonija
- Serbian (archaic): Маћедонија, Maćedonija
- Turkish: Makedonya

== Terminology by group ==
=== Bulgarian ===
- Gărkomani (Гъркомани) is a term used to refer to pro-Greek Slavic speakers.
- Macedonian (Македонец) is a person originating from the region of Macedonia – the term has only regional, not ethnic meaning, and it usually means a Bulgarian, or a clarification is made (Greek, Albanian...).
- Macedonian (Македонски) and the Slavic dialects of Greece are considered dialects of Bulgarian by Bulgarian linguists; not independent languages or dialects of other languages (e.g. Serbian). This is also the popular view in Bulgaria. The Bulgarian government, therefore, has officially recognized the language merely as "the constitutional language of the Republic of North Macedonia". Translations are officially called "adaptations".
- Macedonism (Македонизъм) is a derogatory term to discredit the existence of the Macedonian national identity, seen as originating from Greater Serbian propaganda to divide Bulgarians and denationalize a portion of them in an anti-Bulgarian manner. The origins of Macedonism are typically linked with the Serbian diplomat and historian Stojan Novaković by the Bulgarian historiography.
- Old Bulgarian (Старобългарски) is the name Bulgarians give to the Old Church Slavonic language used in the Ohrid Literary School, among others.

=== Greek ===
- Macedonia (Μακεδονία) usually refers to the region of Greek Macedonia. It can also refer to the modern general definition of Macedonia, but rarely so.
- Macedonian or Makedon (Μακεδόνας, Μακεδών) refers to an ethnically Greek Macedonian.
- Ancient Macedonian or Makedon (Αρχαίος Μακεδόνας, Μακεδών) refers to an Ancient Macedonian.
- Macedonian Slav, Slavic Macedonian or Slavomacedonian (Σλαβομακεδόνας) refers to a member of the Macedonian ethnic group.
- Macedonian Slavic, Slavic Macedonian or Slavomacedonian language (Σλαβομακεδονικά) refers to the Macedonian language.
- Republic of Skopje or State of Skopje (Δημοκρατία των Σκοπίων, Κράτος των Σκοπίων) refers to North Macedonia.
- Skopje (Σκόπια) refers to North Macedonia's capital city of Skopje or to the country as a whole.
- Skopjan (Σκοπιανός) refers to a citizen of Skopje or the rest of North Macedonia too.
- Skopjan language or language of Skopje (Σκοπιανά, γλώσσα των Σκοπίων) refers to the Macedonian language.
- Slavophone (Σλαβόφωνος), meaning Slavic speaker, refers to a member of the Slavic speaking minority in Greece.

=== Ethnic Macedonian ===
- Macedonia (Македонија) can refer to either the region of Macedonia or the Republic of North Macedonia.
- Macedonians (Македонци) generally refers to the Macedonian ethnic group associated with North Macedonia, neighbouring countries and abroad.
- Aegean Macedonia (Егејска Македонија – Egejska Makedonija) refers to Greek Macedonia (as defined by the administrative division of Greece).
- Pirin Macedonia (Пиринска Македонија – Pirinska Makedonija) refers to the Blagoevgrad Province of Bulgaria (as defined by the administrative division of Bulgaria).
- Bugaraši (бугараши) or bugarofili (бугарофили) are derogatory terms used to refer to people in North Macedonia self-identifying as Bulgarian, or having a pro-Bulgarian orientation.
- Egejci (Егејци) refers to people living in North Macedonia and abroad that are originating from Aegean Macedonia (Greek Macedonia), mainly refugees from the Greek Civil War, also known as Aegean Macedonians.
- Grkomani (гркомани) is a derogatory term used to refer to the largest portion of the Slavic-speaking minority of Macedonia in Greece who self-identify as Greeks.
- Old Macedonian (старомакедонски) is a name given to Old Church Slavonic.

== See also ==
- List of homonymous states and regions
- Macedonians (obsolete terminology)
