= Makedonikos antikristos =

Makedonikos antikristos (Greek: Μακεδονικός Αντικριστός) is a dance from Macedonia in Greece. It means "face to face dance from Macedonia", and it is danced by two people, usually by a man and a woman. It is mainly danced in the western side of Macedonia in the city of Kozani.

The most known local song and dance in Kozani, it is a makedonikos antikristos called Enteka (or Endeka) that in Greek means "eleven". That is because it is danced in eleven steps; or because this song was the last to be heard and danced in local celebrations, during the Ottoman Times (up to 1912), as it was forbidden for Christians to congregate after 11 in the night.

Audio Samples

Endeka Kozanis
Endeka Kozanis

== See also ==
- Music of Macedonia (Greece)
