= Kastorianos =

Greek folk dance

Kastorianos (Greek: Καστοριανός) is a kind of a Greek folk dance from Macedonia, Greece. It is very widespread in the cities of Kastoria and Kozani.

== See also ==
- Music of Greece
- Greek dances
