= Famous Macedonia =

Greek march

Macedonia xacūstē
English: Famous Macedonia
- Μακεδονία ξακουστή (Greek)
- Vergina Sun, the emblem of Greek Macedonia
- Unofficial regional anthem of Greek Macedonia

"Famous Macedonia" (Greek: Μακεδονία ξακουστή) is a Greek military march. It is often regarded as the regional anthem of Greek Macedonia, and had been used as the marching song of the Hellenic Army since the Balkan Wars.

It is associated with the Makedonomachoi (Macedonian fighters) in the Macedonian Struggle and can be heard on parades and in national anniversaries.

It is written in Dorian scale, in iambic 15-syllable. The beat is 2/4 and it can be danced as a Hasapiko. It can be performed in conjunction with the Macedonia dance. In addition, the lyrics refer to Alexander the Great.

== History ==
The origin of the march is not certain. According to an ethnographic study conducted in villages in Serres and Drama, the song was not known or danced to in the area. Women from Ano Oreini and Petrousa attribute the Greek lyrics and the teaching of the dance to an anonymous teacher after World War II. Women from Petrousa claim that the melody of the song is a modification of a local melody of theirs, which was made "somewhere more centrally", and they dance to a similar melody with Slavic lyrics and different steps, similar to those of other local traditional dances.

The musicologist Markos Dragoumis found a cassette with Ladino songs of Thessaloniki, which included the melody of the song, as a composition made for the opening of the Schola de la Alianza, the first Jewish school of Thessaloniki, in 1873. Dragoumis guesses that it was either composed for the opening of the school and later was transmitted to the groups in the area, or it was originally composed in the middle of the 19th century by some Western composer for the Ottoman Sultan and later used by the Jewish communities.

In the original version, the song mentioned the Bulgarians and promoted anti-Bulgarian sentiments. The song promotes the idea about the Greekness of Macedonia and Alexander the Great, as well as expressing joy about regaining freedom. The lyrics either originate from the Balkan Wars or the Macedonian Struggle. In Greek folklore, the lyrics have been associated with the Makedonomachoi (Macedonian fighters). After the Balkan Wars, the song continued to be taught in Greek schools, especially in the northern part of the country. During the 1970s, when Greek–Bulgarian relations improved under the government of Konstantinos Karamanlis, the term "Bulgarians" was removed from the lyrics. During the Macedonia naming dispute, in the 1990s, the march was featured in demonstrations asserting the Greekness of Macedonia. The song has been often considered as the unofficial anthem of Greek Macedonia. It is taught in schools in the northern part of the country to promote national values.

According to the Greek Army's website, it is a military march or emvatirio based on the traditional Macedonia dance, which is related with Acrítes of Byzantium.

== Lyrics ==
Modern Greek

Greek script

𝄆 Μακεδονία ξακουστή,
του Αλεξάνδρου η χώρα, 𝄇
𝄆 Που έδιωξες τον τύραννο
κι ελεύθερη είσαι τώρα! 𝄇

𝄆 Ήσουν και είσαι ελληνική,
Ελλήνων το καμάρι, 𝄇
𝄆 Κι εμείς θα σ'αντικρύζουμε,
περήφανα και πάλι! 𝄇

𝄆 Οι Μακεδόνες δε μπορούν
να ζούνε σκλαβωμένοι, 𝄇
𝄆 Όλα και αν τα χάσουνε
η λευτεριά τους μένει! 𝄇

Latin script

𝄆 Macedonia xacūstē,
tū Alexandrū hē chōra, 𝄇
𝄆 Pū ediōxes ton tyranno
ci eleutherē īsae tōra! 𝄇

𝄆 Ēsūn cae īsae hellēnicē,
Hellēnōn to camari, 𝄇
𝄆 Ci hemīs tha s'anticryzūme,
perēphana cae pali! 𝄇

𝄆 Hoe Macedones de borūn
na zūne sclavōmenoe, 𝄇
𝄆 Hola cae an ta chasūne
hē leuteria tūs menī! 𝄇

IPA transcription (Note: See Help:IPA/Greek and Modern Greek phonology.)

𝄆 [ma.ce.ðoˈɲi.a ks̠a.kuˈs̠ti |]
[tu a.leˈks̠an.ðɾu‿i̯ ˈxo.ɾa ‖] 𝄇
𝄆 [pu ˈe.ðjo.ks̠es̠ ton‿ˈdi.ɾa.no |i]
[c‿eˈlef.θe.ɾi‿ˈi.s̠e ˈto.ɾa ‖] 𝄇

𝄆 [ˈi.s̠uɲ‿ɟe ˈi.s̠e‿e.ʎi.ɲiˈci |]
[eˈʎi.non‿do kaˈma.ɾi ‖] 𝄇
𝄆 [ce‿eˈmis̠ θa s̠a(n).diˈkɾi.z̠u.me |]
[peˈɾi.fa.na ce ˈpa.ʎi ‖] 𝄇

𝄆 [i ma.ceˈðo.nez̠‿ðe boˈɾun |]
[na ˈz̠u.ne s̠kla.voˈme.ɲi ‖] 𝄇
𝄆 [ˈo.la ce an‿da ˈxa.s̠u.ne |]
[i lef.teɾˈja tuz̠‿ˈme.ɲi ‖] 𝄇

Modern English

𝄆 Famous Macedonia,
the land of Alexander, 𝄇
𝄆 You drove the tyrant away,
and now you are free. 𝄇

𝄆 You were Greek and yet you still are,
'tis the pride of every Greek, 𝄇
𝄆 We shall recognise you
by your glorious valour. 𝄇

𝄆 Let not the Macedonians
succumb to slavery, 𝄇
𝄆 Even if they lose everything,
their freedom will remain. 𝄇
