= Endeka Kozanis =

Endeka Kozanis is a traditional Greek dance, mostly danced at the region of Kozani. According to one point of view, it is a dance that was being danced at the weddings ("nyfiatikos" as said in Greek).

The dance is believed to have been invented by the Turks, and it originated in Kozani.
