= Partalos =

Type of dance from Macedonia, Greece

Partalos (Greek: παρτάλος), is a Greek dance from Macedonia, Greece. It is a danced exclusively by men and it is very widespread in the area of Pylaia, Thessaloniki. It has six steps that include leaps and squats.

== See also ==
- Music of Greece
- Greek dances
