= O Nikolos =

O Nikolos (Greek: Ο Νικολός), is a kind of a Greek folk dance from the area of Siatista, Greece.

== See also ==
- Music of Greece
- Greek dances
