= Makedonia (dance) =

Greek folk dance

Makedonia (Greek: Μακεδονία, romanized: Macedonía or Greek: Μακεδονικός Χορός, romanized: Macedonicós Chorós) is a form of the Greek folk dance Hasapiko (Greek: χασάπικο, romanized: chasápico) that has evolved over the years to the patriotic song "Makedonia Xakousti" (literally: "Famous Macedonia"), unofficial anthem of the Greek region of Macedonia.

== See also ==
- Greek dances
- Suleiman Aga (dance)
