= Macedonian lyra =

Greek bowed musical instrument

String instrument
- Other names: Macedonian lira, Drama lyra, Dramini lyra

Related instruments
- Byzantine lyra; Calabrian lira (Italian: Lira Calabrese); Classical kemenche (Turkish: Armudî kemençe, Greek: Politiki lyra)

The Macedonian lyra (Greek: Μακεδονική λύρα), also called the Macedonian lira, is a Greek pear-shaped, three-stringed bowed musical instrument associated with the traditional music of Macedonia, especially the local musical traditions of the Drama regional unit and parts of Serres. In the Drama area it is also known as the Drama lyra or Dramini lyra (Greek: Δραμινή λύρα).

The instrument belongs to the wider family of Greek bowed lyras. It is classified as a bowed chordophone, with sound produced by the friction of a bow against its strings. Within Greek lyra types, it belongs to the pear-shaped group, alongside the Cretan, Dodecanesian, Thracian and Constantinopolitan lyras, rather than to the bottle-shaped group represented by the Pontic and Cappadocian lyras.

In Drama, the lyra is especially connected with the villages of Monastiraki, Xiropotamos, Petrousa and Pyrgi, where it is used for local dances, songs and ritual festivities. In these villages it is traditionally paired with the ntaharé or daïres, a frame-drum percussion instrument. This two-instrument ensemble is called a zygiá (Greek: ζυγιά).

== Name and regional forms ==
The term "Macedonian lyra" may be used broadly for related lyra traditions of Greek Macedonia, including the Drama lyra and the related lyra tradition of Pontismeno in Serres. The more specific term "Drama lyra" refers to the local form used in the native villages of Drama. The Drama and Pontismeno forms share similarities in tuning and playing technique, but they differ in repertoire and in the way two lyras are used together. In the Pontismeno form, one lyra may carry the main melody while the other keeps the drone; in the Drama form, when two lyras play together, both normally participate in the melodic line.

== Construction ==
The Macedonian lyra is a wooden, pear-shaped instrument with three strings. The body is traditionally made from a single piece of wood, with no additional wooden reinforcement on the fingerboard area. The resonating body is commonly made from fruitwoods such as mulberry, walnut, plum, cherry or pear, while other woods, such as linden, have also been used experimentally by local makers.

The soundboard is usually made from pine, fir or cedar, selected for straight-grained structure. The bridge and soundpost are made from the same type of material as the soundboard in order to aid sound transmission inside the resonating body. The pegs are commonly made from the same wood as the body, while the tailpiece is made from hard material such as wood or horn from a goat or cow, so that it can withstand string tension during tuning.

Older practice used gut strings. The bow is traditionally wooden and strung with natural horsehair. Rosin is applied to the bow hair to create the friction needed for sound production.

== Tuning and playing technique ==
The Drama lyra has three strings, but the strings do not have identical musical functions. The first string is the principal melodic string and is stopped with the fingernail, a technique also found in other Greek bowed lyras. The third string is used more limitedly and may be stopped with the flesh of the fingertip. The middle string functions as a drone or isokratima.

The bow is normally placed near the bridge and the strings are played in pairs, either first–second or second–third. The middle string therefore continues to sound as a drone while the melody moves around it.

Tuning and performance style vary between villages. In Xiropotamos and Monastiraki, the lyra is tuned A4–A3–E4 and is played with vibrato. In Petrousa, it is tuned G4–G3–D4 and is played in a more legato style.

== Use in local ensembles ==
In the traditional music of Drama, the lyra is one of the main melodic instruments, together with the gkáinta bagpipe. The villages of Xiropotamos, Monastiraki, Petrousa and Pyrgi are especially associated with the lyra and ntaharé pairing, while Kali Vrysi, Micropoli, Pagoneri and Volakas are more closely associated with the gkáinta and ntaharé pairing.

Although the word zygiá literally means a pair, performances may involve more than two musicians. In local festivities, two or more lyras and several ntaharé players may perform together. The ntaharé used with the lyra has a sharper sound than the heavier-sounding percussion used with the gkáinta in some other Drama villages.

Village	Main ensemble	Notes
Xiropotamos	Lyra and ntaharé	One of the main lyra villages of Drama; the lyra is tuned A4–A3–E4 and is played with vibrato.
Monastiraki	Lyra and ntaharé	One of the main lyra villages of Drama; the lyra is tuned A4–A3–E4 and is played with vibrato.
Petrousa	Lyra and ntaharé	One of the main lyra villages of Drama; the lyra is tuned G4–G3–D4 and is played with a legato style.
Pyrgi	Lyra and ntaharé	One of the main villages where the lyra remains a reference point in local traditional music.
Kali Vrysi	Gkáinta and ntaharé	Belongs to the wider Drama musical network, but the main melodic instrument is the bagpipe rather than the lyra.
Micropoli	Gkáinta and ntaharé	Belongs to the wider Drama musical network, with the bagpipe as the main melodic instrument.
Pagoneri	Gkáinta and ntaharé	Belongs to the wider Drama musical network, with the bagpipe as the main melodic instrument.
Volakas	Gkáinta and ntaharé	Belongs to the wider Drama musical network, with the bagpipe as the main melodic instrument.

== Performance context and village customs ==
The Macedonian lyra is closely connected with the local musical life of the native villages of Drama. It is used in village feasts, weddings, gatherings, cultural-association events and annual customs around the Twelve Days of Christmas and Theophany. In these contexts the lyra is usually performed with the ntaharé or daïres, while in other Drama villages the equivalent melodic role is often taken by the gkáinta bagpipe.

Village	Custom or occasion	Description
Monastiraki	Arapides	Associated with the early-January custom around Theophany. A large feast is held on 5 January, while on 6 January the local group, or tseta, goes from house to house offering wishes for the new year. The lyra and ntaharé accompany dancing, feasting and cultural-association events. The feast of Zoodochos Pigi is also described as one of the major annual celebrations for the village and the wider Drama area.
Xiropotamos	Arapides	Associated with the custom on 7 January, the feast of Saint John. Performers visit houses connected with name-day celebrations, while costumed figures such as papoudes, gkilinges and tsoliades dance to local repertory including Leka–Ramna, Teska, Baidouska, Syrtos and Sygkathistos.
Petrousa	Babiden	Associated with the early-January cycle around Theophany and Saint John. The event includes costumed participants, bells, dancing, food, drink and a circular route through the village. Related elements include the camel figure and haraptski, with the lyra and ntaharé accompanying local dances and songs.
Pyrgi	Twelve Days customs	Associated with the Theophany period. The village custom includes an all-night gathering known as davaniska, in which villagers remain awake, drinking and dancing to the sound of the lyra and ntaharé until morning.

== Repertoire ==
The repertoire of the Macedonian lyra consists mainly of dance tunes and songs performed in local feasts, ritual events, weddings, village gatherings and table-song contexts. In the Drama tradition, rhythm, dance and social function are closely connected: a rhythmic category may also name the dance, while some pieces may be performed in more than one local context. The repertoire includes metrical table songs, dance songs, ritual pieces connected with the early-January customs, wedding-road songs, and local songs connected with historical themes.

Repertoire category	Meter	Performance context	Examples	Notes
Kathistika / metrical table songs	Usually 4/4 or metrical table-song style	Sung while seated at table, at feasts and gatherings	«Του παπά την κόρη»; «Μαύρο Γεράκι»; «Στάνυ Γκίωργκη»; «Μη με δέρνεις μάνα»; «Απορώ Μακεδονία»; «Σήμερα μαύρος ουρανός»; «12 ευζωνάκια»; «Όλες οι μάνες»; «Βγήκαν αντάρτες στα βουνά»; «Μακεδονές Έλληνες»; «Σηκώνομαι πρωί πρωί»	Table songs are performed in seated or semi-formal feast contexts rather than primarily as dance tunes. Historical and heroic songs, including songs associated with the Macedonian Struggle, may enter this group when performed as metrical table songs.
Evzonika / Evzonikos	9/8	Circle dance and free dance; connected with heroic or military themes	«Του παπά την κόρη»; «Κυριακή κόβω το δέντρο»; «Εγώ στα ξένα περπατούσα»; «Βασίλεψε αυγερινός»; «Πήγε η Μήνα για νερό»; «Μέρα νύχτα ξενυχτάω»; «Τα ευζωνάκια»; «Στείλε με μάνα για νερό»	The category is associated with heroic and military imagery, especially the figure of the Evzone. It may overlap thematically with table-song repertory, but it functions as a dance category in local performance.
Teska / Varys antikrystos	2/4	Circle dance and facing-pair dance	«Κόρη πούλαγε κρασί»; «Ντιμάνου»; «Καλίνκα μόμα»; «Καλίνου Μαλίνου»; «Σαμπράα λένκα»; «Τσιομπάντζε»; «Νιμπέτι»; «Μη με στέλνεις μάνα στην Αμερική»; «Βαρύ καρσί Καλή Βρύση»; «Γυρίσματα»; «Μικρός τσομπάνης»	One of the main heavy dance categories of the Drama repertory. The term teska is locally understood as "heavy", while varys antikrystos means "heavy facing dance".
Ramna / Leka / Elafrys antikrystos	7/8	Circle dance and facing-pair dance	«Κοίτα με γλυκιά μου αγάπη»; «Ανάθεμα την μάνα σου»; «Ιβάνα»; «Από την Αθήνα ως τον Πειραιά»; «Ζλάτου μόμε»; «Σ’ αυτό το σπίτι το ψηλό»; «Ντβιά Μουμίνκι»; «Ντιμιτρούσου»; «Σνόστα ουτίνταχ να ιόντα»; «Μεσετσίνκου»; «Στουιανελέ»; «Τσάλια κι αγκάθια»; «Καλιοπίτσα»; «Περνώ περνώ»; «Κατεβαίνει η Αναστασία»; «Μάζεψε η Ελένη νυχτέρι»; «Μαρία πήγε για νερό»; «Διαμάντω»; «Εχθές το βράδυ»; «Πάνω σε κείνο το βουνό»; «Μίλα Χρυσάνθη»	One of the main light or straight dance categories. Leka is locally understood as "light", while ramna is understood as "straight"; the same dance type may be named differently from village to village.
Syrtos	7/8	Circle dance	«Στην Αγιά Σοφιά αγνάντα»; «Λενιώ»; «Ο Γιώργος»; «Σου ’πα μάνα πάντρεψέ με»; «Ο Κωνσταντίνος»; «Από μικρός ορφάνεψα»; «Κρίμα Ελένη»; «Αρχοντογιός»; «Η Ευγενούλα η όμορφη»; «Τζάνε ποταμέ»; «Βαρέθηκα καλέ μάνα»; «16 μήνες στο στρατό»; «Μαύρα μάτια είδα απόψε»; «Στον Άδη θα κατέβω»; «Θέλω να πάω στην Αραπιά»; «Τα κλεφτόπουλα»; «Ένα παλικάρι 12 χρονών»; «Αχ χείλη μου μελαχρινό»; «Στο βουνό μια βοσκοπούλα»; «Μαύρα μάτια στο ποτήρι»; «Μηλίτσα»; «Δε λαλείς γλυκό μου αηδόνι»; «Ο ήλιος εβασίλεψε»; «Δυο αδέρφια είχαν μια αδελφή»; «Το λένε τα αηδονάκια»	A widespread Greek dance category adapted to the local style of Drama. Several songs circulate in different village versions while retaining the general syrtos function.
Mantzourana	7/8	Local dance repertory	«Ματζουράνα»	Dance with the song of the same name from Monastiraki, Drama. It is a fast seven-beat dance.
Baidouska / Paitouska	6/8	Mainly circle dance, sometimes facing-pair dance	«Ροδούλα κόρη»; «Γκαϊταντζιά»; «Κάτω στη Ρόιδω»; «Μπαϊντούσκα Πύργων»; «Παϊτούσκα»	A fast dance category of the Drama repertory. In the Drama villages this rhythm is performed in 6/8, unlike some other Macedonian and Thracian versions that may be encountered in 5/8.
Pardala tsourapia	9/8	Local dance repertory	«Παρδαλά τσουράπια»	A distinct local dance/tune category. The title literally refers to "multicoloured socks", a common type of vivid image in folk-song naming.
Kori Eleni / Eleno mome	7/8	Local dance repertory	«Κόρη Ελένη»; «Ελένο μόμε»	A distinct local dance/tune category. The title belongs to the common folk-song pattern of addressing or describing a named young woman.
Maria Maria / Bourgianke / Bouirankou	2/4	Local dance repertory	«Μαρία Μαρία» / «Μπουργιάνκε» / «Μπουιράνκου»	A specific local dance tune. It is related to the wider elafrys antikrystos and hasapia grouping, but can be presented separately because it functions as a named dance/tune.
Trexe Gianna	7/8	Local dance repertory	«Τρέξε Γιάννα»	Local dance/tune recorded in Xiropotamos.
Lazaritsa		Local dance repertory	«Λαζαρίτσα»; «Λαζαρίτσα Αλιστράτης»	A distinct local dance/tune.
Vangelitsa		Local dance repertory	«Βαγγελίτσα»	A distinct local dance/tune.
Panagiota		Local dance repertory	«Παναγιώτα»	A named local dance/tune connected with women’s dance practice and resistance memory from the Ottoman period.
Na deis giagia		Local dance repertory	«Να δεις γιαγιά»	Local dance/song from Kali Vrysi connected with the memory of the Macedonian fighter Armen Kouptsios.
Macedonia	2/4	Broader Macedonian song repertory	«Μακεδονία ξακουστή»; «Μακεδονία»	A broader Macedonian song type performed within the local Drama style. Such songs can enter local repertory while retaining a wider regional identity.
Leventikos / Haraptsa	2/4	Early-January ritual performance	«Λεβέντικος» / «Χαράπτσα»; «Σάλα σάλα»	A ritual opening dance/tune category linked with the early-January customs. In Petroússa, Leventikos is described as the first instrumental piece played in Bábiden and was formerly called Haraptsa.
Karsilamas	9/8	Wedding-road and local dance repertory	«Σγουρός βασιλικός»; «Τι ήθελα και σ’ αγαπούσα»	A 9/8 facing-dance family common across Greek and Balkan repertories. In Drama, it includes wedding-road and local dance items such as «Σγουρός βασιλικός».
Magiron	7/16	Local dance and feast repertory	«Χορός των Μαγείρων»; «Σκοπός των μαγείρων»	A specialized local dance/tune category associated with feast performance. In the Petroússa repertory it is documented in 7/16.

The same tune or song may be performed differently depending on village, occasion and players. Local performance often follows a sequence of songs and instrumental pieces known as a sira (Greek: σειρά), arranged to support continuous dancing rather than as isolated pieces.

== Musicians and transmission ==
The Macedonian lyra tradition has been transmitted mainly through oral and practical learning. Musicians commonly learned by observing older players, copying technique and repertory, and gradually participating in public performance. Some players also made their own instruments or inherited instruments from earlier generations.

Not all listed musicians were professional performers in the modern sense. Many were village musicians whose importance came from their role in local feasts, rituals, dance accompaniment, cultural associations, recordings, teaching and instrument making.

Village	Lyra players	Ntaharé / daïres players	Other instrument makers or multi-instrumentalists
Monastiraki	Anestis Touloumis; Dimitrios Touloumis; Vasileios Loukas; Stergios Kioroglou; Fylaktos Terzis; Nikos Touloumis; Giorgos Touloumis; Ilias Tantsinis; Vasileios Glavas; Theodoros Glavas; Kostas Solakis; Thanasis Glavas; Angelos Gianoglou; Kostas Alatzas; Alexandros Papoutsis	Antonis Loukas; Nikolaos Kiakos; Andreas Kiakos; Angelos Vaslis; Dimitris Loukas; Theodoros Mitrousis	Fylaktos Terzis is described as having played Thracian lyra, which influenced and interacted with the local lyra tradition.
Xiropotamos	Andreas Kioumourtzis; Georgios Kyriakidis; Avraam Demisis; Athanasios Kiosses; Georgios Arnaoutis; Vasileios Tragos; Antonios Ilousis; Nikolaos Argyriadis; Ioannis Mitrou; Vasileios Kiosses; Konstantinos Tragos; Ioannis Kioumourtzis; Vasileios Kioumourtzis; Christos Kioumourtzis; Angelos Paschalis; Theodoros Mitrou; Andreas Theologidis; Ioannis Kiorvantsis; Dimitrios Poulisis; Dimitrios Chariskos; Vasileios Varsamis; Stergios Demisis; Nikos Chariskos; Christodoulos Markopoulos; Giorgos Mitrou	Konstantinos Demisis; Aikaterini Kouniou; Thanasis Solakis; Panagiotis Mylonas	Rissos Kioumourtzis is described as an older musician who played lyra, ntaharé, gkáinta, kavali and harmonica, and also made instruments. Dimitrios Kiorvantsis is described as a lyra player, daïres player and accordionist.
Petrousa	Dimitrios Katratzis; Athanasios Katsiouras; Dimitrios Toukmaktzis; Dimitrios Zedamanis; Nikolaos Bairaktaris; Konstantinos Ouroumis; Angelos Giannikis; Lazaros Ouroumis; Andreas Rengis; Nikolaos Zedamanis	Athanasios Giannikis; Anestis Lekos; Anestis Pyrros; Vasileios Tsiokas; Konstantinos Giantsios; Georgios Tsanios; Athanasios Ntokos; Angelos Tsernios; Angelos Zedamanis; Dimitrios Ouroumis	Dimitrios Zedamanis, Nikolaos Bairaktaris, Konstantinos Ouroumis and other local musicians are associated with instrument making or the transmission of instruments within the village tradition.
Pyrgi	Grigorios Papaemmanouil; Ioannis Kouzas; Paschalis Giannakou; Sotirios Tsaprazis; Theodoros Kaltsamis	Sotiris Tsanis; Kostas Kaltsamis	Theodoros Kaltsamis has taught Drama lyra at the Music School of Drama and is associated with the continued performance of the Pyrgi style.

== Discography and documentation ==
The musical tradition of Drama has been documented in local recordings, cultural-association releases and ethnographic fieldwork. Recorded material includes music from Volakas, Kali Vrysi, Monastiraki, Xiropotamos, Petrousa and Pyrgi, as well as dedicated releases on the musical traditions of Petrousa and Xiropotamos.

Title	English rendering	Issuer / editor	Year	Format / catalogue	Notes
Κάλεσμα: Μουσική και τραγούδια από τον Βώλακα, την Καλή Βρύση, το Μοναστηράκι, τον Ξηροπόταμο, την Πετρούσα και τους Πύργους Δράμας	Kalesma: Music and songs from Volakas, Kali Vrysi, Monastiraki, Xiropotamos, Petrousa and Pyrgi of Drama	Prefectural Administration of Drama; Music School of Drama	2017	CD; Magiki Pyxida, cat. no. 1482	Compilation covering several local traditions of the Drama regional unit.
Μουσικοί Θησαυροί Δράμας	Musical Treasures of Drama	Edited by Rozana Lada; Municipality of Drama / Municipal Enterprise for Social, Cultural and Tourist Development	2000	CD; cat. no. 1763	Regional collection of traditional music from Drama.
Τραγούδια του Μακεδονικού Αγώνα (από την Ανατολική Μακεδονία)	Songs of the Macedonian Struggle from Eastern Macedonia	Ergastiri Ellinikis Mousikis (ER.E.M.); Filoptochos Brotherhood of Men of Thessaloniki, 1871	—	CD	Thematic release focused on songs connected with the Macedonian Struggle.
Μουσική και τραγούδια στην ντοπιολαλιά από τον Ξηροπόταμο Δράμας	Music and songs in the local dialect from Xiropotamos, Drama	Stergios Demisis	2012	CD	Dedicated to the local musical tradition of Xiropotamos.
Μουσικές Μνήμες Ξηροποτάμου Δράμας	Musical Memories of Xiropotamos, Drama	Educational and Cultural Association of Xiropotamos	—	CD	Local release documenting the musical tradition of Xiropotamos.
Μουσική Παράδοση Πετρούσας	The Musical Tradition of Petrousa	Cultural Association of Petrousa	2001	CD, vol. 1–2	Dedicated release on the local musical tradition of Petrousa.
Μακεδονικά Παραδοσιακά: Σκοποί και τραγούδια της Δράμας — Μοναστηράκι, Ξηροπόταμος, Πετρούσα, Πύργοι, Βώλακας, Καλή Βρύση	Macedonian Traditional Music: Instrumental pieces and songs of Drama — Monastiraki, Xiropotamos, Petrousa, Pyrgi, Volakas, Kali Vrysi	Semiramis Music / Lyra	1992	Vinyl and cassette; Lyra 4653	Regional release covering several villages of Drama.
Τοπική Ηχογράφηση Καλής Βρύσης Δράμας	Local recording of Kali Vrysi, Drama	LC / local recording	—	—	Local recording associated with the Kali Vrysi tradition.
Τραγούδια από τον Βώλακα Δράμας	Songs from Volakas, Drama	—	—	—	Local recording associated with the Volakas tradition.

== See also ==
- Greek folk music
- Byzantine lyra
- Cretan lyra
- Pontic lyra
- Thracian lyra
- Classical kemenche
