= A Grammar of the Macedonian Literary Language =

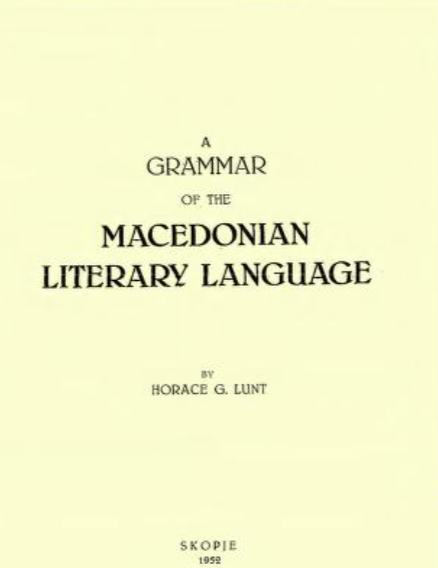
- Title page for A Grammar of the Macedonian Literary Language (1952)
- Author: Horace Lunt
- Language: English, with an anthology of texts in Macedonian and a bilingual dictionary
- Subject: Macedonian language
- Publication date: 1952
- OCLC: 673833595
- Dewey Decimal: 491.819
- LC Class: PG1162

A Grammar of the Macedonian Literary Language is the title of the first English-language grammar of Macedonian. The grammar was written by Horace Lunt, an American working in Yugoslavia.

== Bibliography ==
- Lunt, H. G. (1952) A Grammar of the Macedonian Literary Language (Skopje)
