= Horace Lunt =

American Slavicist

- Born: September 12, 1918; Colorado Springs, Colorado, United States
- Died: August 11, 2010 (aged 91); Baltimore, Maryland, United States
- Occupation: Professor

Academic background
- Education: Columbia University

Academic work
- Discipline: Linguistics
- Sub-discipline: Slavic Languages
- Institutions: Harvard
- Notable works: A Grammar of the Macedonian Literary Language; Old Church Slavonic Grammar

Horace Gray Lunt (September 12, 1918 – August 11, 2010) was a linguist in the field of Slavic studies. He was Professor Emeritus at the Slavic Language and Literature Department and the Ukrainian Institute at Harvard University.

== Life ==
Lunt was born on September 12, 1918, in Colorado Springs, United States. He attended Harvard College, where he was Samuel Hazzard Cross' undergraduate student in German. Cross encouraged him to develop an interest in Slavic studies. He gained a bachelor's degree in Harvard. In 1942, he attended University of California, gaining a master's degree in Russian and Slavic philology. In the same year, he was drafted into the United States Army during World War II. He served briefly in the Medical Department, and in 1943, he became part of the Counterintelligence Corps. Lunt was included in secluded army camps for intensive training in the use of weapons and vehicles, as a member of a small group of soldiers. As Lunt had knowledge of Serbo-Croatian, which he had studied at Harvard and Berkeley, he was assigned to an Anglo-American team. From early March 1944 until the end of the war in Europe, he served in Bari, Italy, interrogating refugees who had crossed the Adriatic Sea from Yugoslavia. In June 1945, Lunt was sent to Trieste, where his unit was included in the Allied Military Government of Occupied Territories. He was tasked with reporting on Slovenian political activity in the Trieste region, quickly learning Slovene. After he arrived in Washington D.C., he was pressured to take a new assignment in an intelligence service of the army, but he decided to end his involvement with the army.

Lunt enrolled in the PhD program at Berkeley and worked as a teaching assistant in Russian in 1946. He attended the Linguistic Institute summer program of the Linguistic Society of America at the University of Michigan, which trained him in trends in neo-Bloomfieldian descriptive linguistics. He studied in Prague, sponsored by a Masaryk Fellowship awarded by the Czechslovak government, as a PhD candidate in Slavic at the Charles University. Along with courses in Russian, Slovene, and Serbo-Croatian, he joined Antonin Frinta's course on Macedonian, which was the first formal course of the new official language outside of Yugoslavia. Lunt became familiar with the first and second editions of Krume Kepeski's school grammars. He was advised by American and Czech advisers to leave Prague partly because of the deteriorating political situation and partly because Roman Jakobson was at Columbia University, thus he left in 1947.

He studied Slavic linguistics under Jakobson at Columbia. During 1948/1949 at Columbia, Lunt was a lecturer in Serbo-Croatian. He made a dissertation on early East Slavic orthography, receiving his doctorate in 1950. Lunt joined the Harvard University faculty in 1949 together with his mentor. He would go on to have a four-decade career at Harvard, teaching Slavic linguistics to generations of students and publishing articles, reviews, and books. From 1949 to 1954, Lunt was Assistant Professor of Slavic Languages and Literatures at Harvard University, giving lectures as part of the Russian program, Old Church Slavonic, and other historical linguistic courses. His work on Old Church Slavonic resulted in the publication of its grammar in 1955, noted for being the second (after Nikolai Trubetzkoy's) OCS grammar to analyze the language in terms of structural linguistics. The sixth edition from 1974 was supplied with a generative analysis of OCS phonology, which was replaced in the final, seventh edition (2001) with a historical section describing the development from Proto-Indo-European to OCS.

In June 1950, Lunt was sent by Harvard University to Yugoslavia to re-establish contact with Yugoslav academia that had been disrupted since 1941 by war and post-war policies. In August, he attended the Seminar for Foreign Slavists at Bled sponsored by the Yugoslav Ministry of Science and Culture, where he met Yugoslav scholars Blaže Koneski, Krum Tošev, and Haralampije Polenaković, who were lecturing. Lunt talked to them about the Macedonian language, who familiarized him with it, and he inquired about doing linguistic fieldwork in the Socialist Republic of Macedonia. Koneski agreed to make arrangements for Lunt to visit. Harvard gave Lunt a semester off, while Koneski acquired permissions from the authorities so that Lunt can reside in SR Macedonia. For his fieldwork in SR Macedonia, he was sponsored by the Yugoslav Council for Science and Culture and the Macedonian Ministry of Education, Science, and Culture. Apart from Koneski, Lunt relied heavily on information by Božidar Vidoeski and Radmila Ugrinova-Skalovska, who worked as assistants in the Department of South Slavic Languages at Skopje University. Per Slavist Victor Friedman, he was tracked by OZNA. Lunt wrote an article on the morphology of the Macedonian verb in 1951. In August 1952, his grammar of Literary Macedonian, the first English language grammar of Macedonian, was printed at the Jugoštampa printing house. The grammar was a contribution to the standardization of Macedonian, which made Lunt subject to political criticism in Bulgaria and Greece. Lunt also contributed to the development of Macedonian studies at universities in United States. Lunt was the first American citizen to be elected as a member of the Macedonian Academy of Sciences and Arts. In 1963, he married feminist and political activist Sally Herman, with whom he had two daughters. In 1973, his Harvard colleague Omeljan Pritsak convinced him to lead a weekly seminar at Harvard Ukrainian Research Institute to review and improve his own translation of the Rus Primary Chronicle. He died due to pneumonia and complications from Parkinson's disease on August 11, 2010, in Baltimore, United States.

== Works ==
- A Grammar of the Macedonian Literary Language (1952). Skopje: Државно книгоиздателство на НР Македонија.
- Old Church Slavonic Grammar (1955). 'S-Gravenhage: Mouton & Co.
  - 7th edition: 2001. Berlin, New York: Walter de Gruyter. ISBN 3-11-016284-9
- Fundamentals of Russian: First Russian Course (1958). 'S-Gravenhage: Mouton & Co.
  - Revised edition: 1968. New York: W. W. Norton & Company.
- Concise Dictionary of Old Russian (11th–17th Centuries) (1970). München: Wilhelm Fink Verlag.
  - 2nd edition: 2012. Bloomington: Slavica. Edited by Oscar E. Swan.
- The Progressive Palatalization of Common Slavic (1981). Skopje: Macedonian Academy of Sciences and Arts.
- with Moshe Taube: The Slavonic Book of Esther: Text, Lexicon, Linguistic Analysis, Problems of Translation (1998). Cambridge-Massachusetts: Harvard University Press.
