= Macedonians (ethnic group) =

South Slavic ethnic group

Macedonians Македонци Makedonci
- Map of the Macedonian diaspora in the world

Total population
- c. 2 million

Regions with significant populations
- North Macedonia 1,073,375
- Australia: 111,352 (2021 census) – 200,000
- Germany: 102,000 (2019) – 117,969 (2020)
- Italy: 65,347–75,000 (2017)
- United States: 61,753–200,000
- Switzerland: 61,304–69,000
- Brazil: 45,000
- Canada: 43,110 (2016 census) – 200,000
- Turkey: 31,518 (2001 census)
- Argentina: 30,000
- Greece: 10,000–20,000
- Austria: 20,135–25,000
- Netherlands: 10,000–15,000
- Serbia: 14,767 (2022 census)
- United Kingdom: 9,000 (est.)
- Finland: 8,963
- Hungary: 7,253
- Albania: 2,281 (2023 census)
- Denmark: 5,392 (2018)
- Slovakia: 4,600
- Sweden: 4,491 (2009)
- Croatia: 4,138 (2011 census)
- Slovenia: 14,863 (2023)
- Belgium: 3,419 (2002)
- Norway: 3,045
- France: 2,300–15,000
- Bosnia and Herzegovina: 2,278 (2005)
- Czech Republic: 2,011
- Poland: 2,000–4,500
- Romania: 1,264 (2011 census)
- Bulgaria: 1,143 (2021 census)
- Montenegro: 900 (2011 census)
- New Zealand: 807–1,500
- Portugal: 310
- Russia: 155

Languages
- Macedonian

Religion
- Predominantly Eastern Orthodox Christianity (Macedonian Orthodox Church); Minority Sunni Islam (Macedonian Muslims); Catholicism (Roman Catholic and Macedonian Greek Catholic)

Related ethnic groups
- Other South Slavs, especially Slavic speakers of Greek Macedonia, Bulgarians (Note: See:) and Torlak speakers in Serbia

Macedonians (Macedonian: Македонци, romanized: Makedonci [maˈkɛdɔnt͡si]) are a nation and a South Slavic ethnic group native to the region of Macedonia in Southeast Europe. They speak Macedonian, a South Slavic language. The large majority of Macedonians identify as Eastern Orthodox Christians, who share a cultural and historical "Orthodox Byzantine–Slavic heritage" with their neighbours. About two-thirds of all ethnic Macedonians live in North Macedonia; there are also communities in a number of other countries.

The concept of a Macedonian ethnicity, distinct from their Orthodox Balkan neighbours, is seen to be a comparatively newly emergent one. (Note: See:) The earliest manifestations of an incipient Macedonian identity emerged during the second half of the 19th century among limited circles of Slavic-speaking intellectuals, predominantly outside the region of Macedonia. They arose after the First World War and especially during the 1930s, and thus were consolidated by Communist Yugoslavia's governmental policy after the Second World War. (Note: See:)

Following the dissolution of the Ottoman Empire, the decisive point in the ethnogenesis of the South Slavic ethnic group was the creation of the Socialist Republic of Macedonia after World War II, a state in the framework of the Socialist Federal Republic of Yugoslavia. This was followed by the development of a separate Macedonian language and national literature, and the foundation of a distinct Macedonian Orthodox Church and national historiography. The formation of the ethnic Macedonians as a separate community has been also shaped by population displacement as well as by language shift, both the result of the political developments in the region of Macedonia during the 20th century.

== History ==
=== Ancient period ===
In antiquity, much of central-northern modern Macedonia (the Vardar basin) corresponded to Paeonia and was inhabited by the Paeonians; North Macedonia geographically roughly corresponds to the ancient kingdom of Paeonia, which was located north of the ancient kingdom of Macedon. Scupi and the surrounding region was part of the kingdom of Dardania. The Pelagonian plain was inhabited by the Pelagones and the Lyncestae, ancient Greek tribes of Upper Macedonia; whilst the western region (Ohrid-Prespa) was inhabited by Illyrian tribes, such as the Enchelae.

During the late Classical Period, in 356 BC, the kingdom of Paeonia ruled by Lyppeius, having already developed several sophisticated polis-type settlements and a thriving economy based on mining, became subject to Philip II of Macedon, while its southern part formed 'Macedonian Paeonia'. In 279 BC, the Celts attacked deep into the south, subduing various local tribes, such as the Dardanians, the Paeonians and the Triballi.

Roman conquest brought with it a significant Romanization of the region. During the Dominate period, 'barbarian' foederati were settled on Macedonian soil at times; such as the Sarmatians settled by Constantine the Great (330s AD) or the 10-year settlement of Alaric I's Goths.

=== Medieval period ===
In contrast to 'frontier provinces', the Diocese of Macedonia continued to be a flourishing Christian, Roman province in Late Antiquity and into the Early Middle Ages. Scupi was one of the main centers of Roman Dardania. The Byzantine emperor Justinian the Great was born in Tauresium of Dardania.

Linguistically, the South Slavic languages from which Macedonian developed are thought to have expanded in the region during the post-Roman period, although the exact mechanisms of this linguistic expansion remains a matter of scholarly discussion. Traditional historiography has equated these changes with the commencement of raids and 'invasions' of Sclaveni and Antes from Wallachia and western Ukraine during the 6th and 7th centuries. However, recent anthropological and archaeological perspectives have viewed the appearance of Slavs in Macedonia, and throughout the Balkans in general, as part of a broad and complex process of transformation of the cultural, political and ethnolinguistic Balkan landscape before the collapse of Roman authority. The exact details and chronology of population shifts remain to be determined. What is beyond dispute is that, in contrast to "barbarian" Bulgaria, northern Macedonia remained Roman in its cultural outlook into the 7th century.

Yet at the same time, sources attest numerous Slavic tribes in the environs of Thessalonica and further afield, including the Berziti in Pelagonia. Apart from Slavs and late Byzantines, Kuber's "Sermesianoi" – a mix of c. 70,000 Byzantine Greeks predominantly, also Kuber's Bulgars and Pannonian Avars – settled the "Keramissian plain" (Pelagonia) around Bitola in the late 7th century. Later pockets of settlers included "Danubian" Bulgars in the 9th century; Magyars (Vardariotai) and Armenians in the 10th–12th centuries, Cumans and Pechenegs in the 11th–13th centuries, and Saxon miners in the 14th and 15th centuries. Vlachs (Aromanians) and Arbanasi (Albanians) also inhabited this area in the Middle Ages and mingeled with the local Slavic-speakers.

Having previously been Byzantine clients, the Sklaviniae of Macedonia switched their allegiance to the Bulgars with their incorporation into the Bulgarian Empire in the mid-800s. In the 860s, Byzantine missionaries Cyril and Methodius created the Glagolitic alphabet and Slavonic liturgy based on the Slavic dialect around Thessaloniki for a mission to Great Moravia. After the demise of the Great Moravian mission in 886, exiled students of the two apostles brought the Glagolitic alphabet to the Bulgarian Empire, where Boris I of Bulgaria (r. 852–889) welcomed them. As part of his efforts to limit Byzantine influence and assert Bulgarian independence, he adopted Christianity as official state religion and Old Church Slavic as official ecclesiastical and state language. He established the Preslav Literary School and Ohrid Literary School, which taught Slavonic liturgy and the Glagolitic and subsequently the Cyrillic alphabet. The success of Boris I's efforts was a major factor in making later the Slavs in Macedonia—and the other Slavs within the First Bulgarian State—adopt the common demonym Bulgarians and transforming the Bulgar state into a Bulgarian state. Subsequently, the literary and ecclesiastical centre in Ohrid became a second cultural capital of medieval Bulgaria. Samuel of Bulgaria ruled from 997 to 1014 and is among the most renowned Bulgarian rulers best known for his military struggle with the Byzantine Empire. A Byzantine province called Bulgaria, with its capital in Skopje, was established after the conquest of Bulgaria in 1018.

In the mid-14th century, most of Macedonia became part of the Serbian Empire. Skopje became the capital of Tsar Stefan Dušan's empire. Following Dušan's death, a weak successor appeared, and power struggles between nobles divided the Balkans once again. These events coincided with the entry of the Ottoman Turks into Europe.

The Kingdom of Prilep was one of the short-lived states that emerged from the collapse of the Serbian Empire in the 14th century, and was seized by the Ottomans at the end of the same century.

=== Ottoman period ===
After the final conquest of the Balkans by the Ottomans in the 14th/15th century, all Eastern Orthodox Christians were included in a specific ethno-religious community under Graeco-Byzantine jurisdiction called Rum Millet. Belonging to this religious commonwealth was so important that most of the common people began to identify themselves as Christians. However, ethnonyms never disappeared and some form of primary ethnic identity was available. This is confirmed from a Sultan's Firman from 1680 which describes the ethnic groups in the Balkan territories of the Empire as follows: Greeks, Albanians, Serbs, Vlachs and Bulgarians.

Throughout the Middle Ages and Ottoman rule up until the early 20th century the Slavic-speaking population majority in the region of Macedonia were more commonly referred to (both by themselves and outsiders) as Bulgarians. However, in pre-nationalist times, terms such as "Bulgarian" did not possess a strict ethno-nationalistic meaning, rather, they were loose, often interchangeable terms which could simultaneously denote regional habitation, allegiance to a particular empire, religious orientation, membership in certain social groups. (Note: See:) Overall, in the Middle Ages, "a person's origin was distinctly regional", and in the Ottoman era, before the 19th-century rise of nationalism, it was based on the corresponding confessional community. On the other side, according to Richard J. Crampton, the development of Old Church Slavonic literacy during the 10th century had the effect of preventing the assimilation of the Eastern South Slavs into the Byzantine culture, which promoted the formation of a distinct Bulgarian identity then.

The rise of nationalism under the Ottoman Empire in the early 19th century brought opposition to this continued situation. At that time, the classical Rum Millet began to degrade. The coordinated actions, carried out by Bulgarian national leaders and supported by the majority of the Slavic-speaking population in today's Republic of North Macedonia (the second anti-Greek revolt was in Skopje) to have a separate "Bulgarian Millet", finally bore fruit in 1870 when a firman for the creation of the Bulgarian Exarchate was issued. In June 1870, the Macedonian side expressed openly and clearly its views on how the Exarchist Church should be governed in order for the Macedonians to join it, because "... the high mercy was not promised exclusively to the Bulgarians, but the same was promised also to the Macedonians ...". The realization of this possibility, according to the article published in the Bulgarian newspaper Makedoniya, was conditioned by the promotion of democratic principles in the religious relations between the Macedonian and Bulgarian communities. Otherwise, the determination for centralism—referred to in the article as "despotism"—would open to the public the issue of the "Macedonian Question". The anonymous author argued: "We broke away from the Greeks; shall we fall under others?" In September 1872, the Ecumenical Patriarch Anthimus VI declared the Exarchate schismatic and excommunicated its adherents, accusing them of having "surrendered Orthodoxy to ethnic nationalism", i.e., "ethnophyletism" (Greek: εθνοφυλετισμός). At the time of its creation, the only Vardar Macedonian bishopric included in the Exarchate was Veles.

However, in 1874, the Christian population of the bishoprics of Skopje and Ohrid were given the chance to participate in a plebiscite, where they voted overwhelmingly in favour of joining the Exarchate (Skopje by 91%, Ohrid by 97%) Referring to the results of the plebiscites, and on the basis of statistical and ethnological indications, the 1876 Conference of Constantinople included all of present-day North Macedonia (except for the Debar region) and parts of present-day Greek Macedonia. The borders of new Bulgarian state, drawn by the 1878 Treaty of San Stefano, also included Macedonia, but the treaty was never put into effect and the Treaty of Berlin (1878) "returned" Macedonia to the Ottoman Empire.

For Christian Slav peasants, however, the choice between the Patriarchate and the Exarchate was not tainted with national meaning, but was a choice of Church or millet, and unsurprisingly the majority preferred the Slavic (Bulgarian) Church over the non-Slavic Greek one. Furthermore, adherence to the Bulgarian national cause was attractive as a means of opposing oppressive Christian chiflik owners and urban merchants, who usually identified with the Greek nation, as a way to escape arbitrary taxation by Patriarchate bishops, via shifting allegiance to the Exarchate and on account of the free (and, occasionally, even subsidized) provision of education in Bulgarian schools. Alignment of the Slavs of Macedonia with the Bulgarian, the Greek or sometimes the Serbian national camp did not imply adherence to different national ideologies: these camps were not stable, culturally distinct groups, but parties with national affiliations, described by contemporary observers as "sides", "wings", "parties" or "political clubs". Furthermore, any expression of national identity among the majority of Macedonian Slavs was purely superficial and imposed by the nationalist educational and religious propaganda or by terrorism from guerrilla bands. Also, more astute foreign observers who visited Macedonia at the time concluded that Macedonian Slavs linguistically were neither Bulgarians nor Serbs. Considering all of the previous circumstances, it is possible to argue that the Macedonian Slavs formed a separate nationality.

=== Identity ===
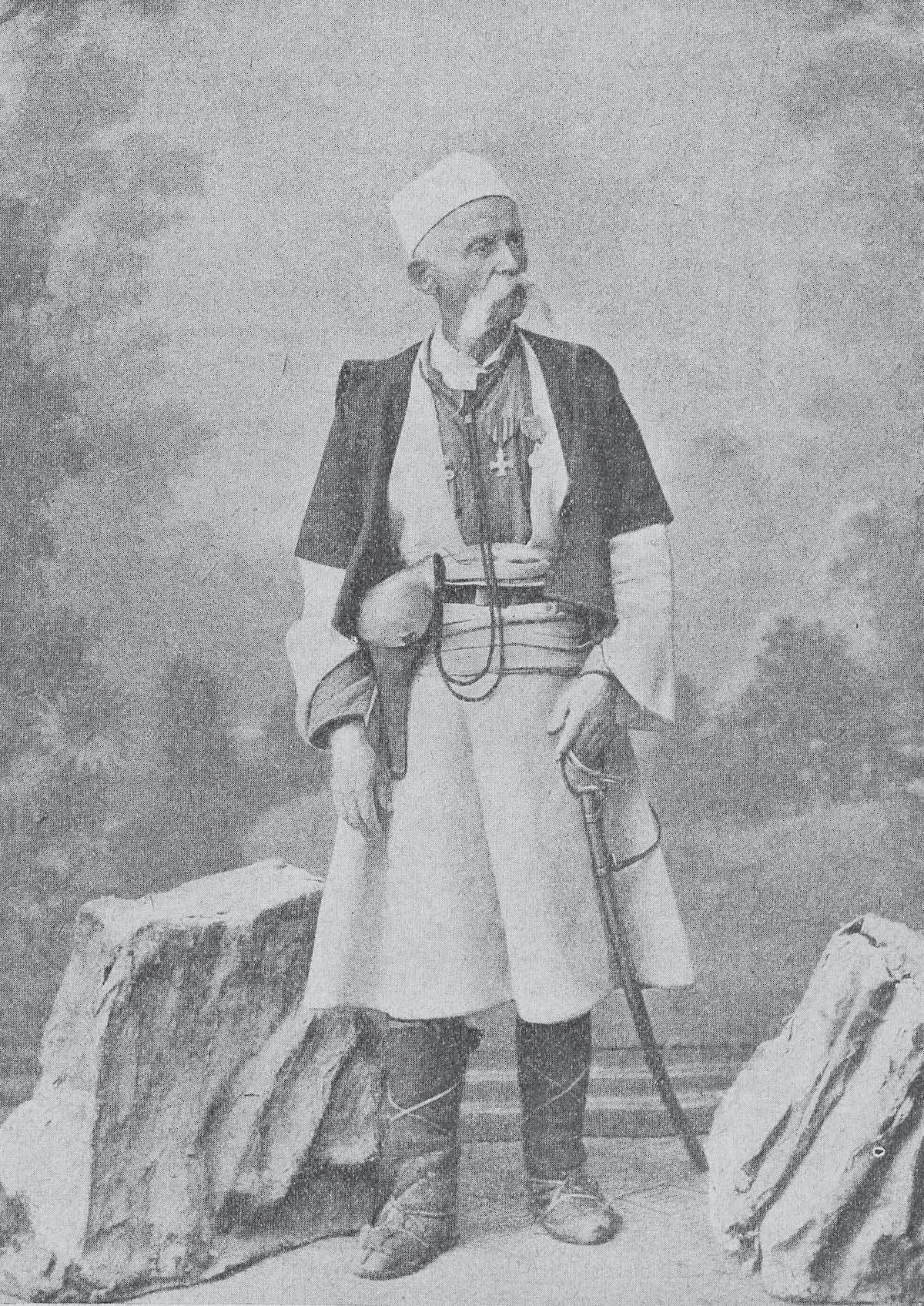
Gjorgjija Pulevski is the first known person, who in 1875 put forward the idea on the existence of a separate (Slavic) Macedonian language and ethnicity.

The first expressions of Macedonian nationalism occurred in the second half of the 19th century mainly among intellectuals in Belgrade, Sofia, Thessaloniki and St. Petersburg. Since the 1850s some Slavic intellectuals from the area adopted the Greek designation Macedonian as a regional label, and it began to gain popularity. In the 1860s, according to Petko Slaveykov in his newspaper Makedoniya, some young intellectuals from Macedonia were claiming that they are not Bulgarians, but rather Macedonians, descendants of the Ancient Macedonians. In a letter written to the Bulgarian Exarch in February 1874 Petko Slaveykov reports that discontent with the current situation "has given birth among local patriots to the disastrous idea of working independently on the advancement of their own local dialect and what's more, of their own, separate Macedonian church leadership." The activities of these people were also registered by the Serbian politician Stojan Novaković, who promoted the idea to use the Macedonian nationalism in order to oppose the strong pro-Bulgarian sentiments in the area. The nascent Macedonian nationalism, illegal at home in the theocratic Ottoman Empire, and illegitimate internationally, waged a precarious struggle for survival against overwhelming odds: in appearance against the Ottoman Empire, but in fact against the three expansionist Balkan states and their respective patrons among the Great Powers.

The first known author that overtly speaks of a Macedonian nationality and language was Gjorgjija Pulevski, who in 1875 published in Belgrade a Dictionary of Three languages: Macedonian, Albanian, Turkish, in which he wrote that the Macedonians are a separate nation and the place which is theirs is called Macedonia. In 1880, he published in Sofia a Grammar of the language of the Slavic Macedonian population, a work that is today known as the first attempt at a grammar of Macedonian. In 1885, Theodosius of Skopje, a priest who held a high-ranking position within the Bulgarian Exarchate, was chosen as a bishop of the episcopacy of Skopje. In 1890 he renounced de facto the Bulgarian Exarchate and attempted to restore the Archbishopric of Ohrid as a separate Macedonian Orthodox Church in all eparchies of Macedonia, responsible for the spiritual, cultural and educational life of all Macedonian Orthodox Christians, as he considered that there was an ethnic difference between Macedonians and their Orthodox Christian neighbors. During this time period Metropolitan Bishop Theodosius of Skopje made a plea to the Greek Patriarchate of Constantinople to allow a separate Macedonian church, and ultimately on 4 December 1891 he sent a letter to the Pope Leo XIII to ask for a recognition and a protection from the Roman Catholic Church, but failed. Soon after, he repented and returned to pro-Bulgarian positions. In the 1880s and 1890s, Isaija Mažovski designated Macedonian Slavs as "Macedonians" and "Old Slavic Macedonian people", and also distinguished them from Bulgarians as follows: "Slavic-Bulgarian" for Mažovski was synonymous with "Macedonian", while only "Bulgarian" was a designation for the Bulgarians in Bulgaria.

In 1890, Austrian researcher of Macedonia Karl Hron reported that the Macedonians constituted a separate ethnic group by history and language. Within the next few years, this concept was also welcomed in Russia by linguists including Leonhard Masing, Pyotr Lavrov, Jan Baudouin de Courtenay, and Pyotr Draganov. Draganov, of Bulgarian descent, conducted research in Macedonia and determined that the local language had its own identifying characteristics compared to Bulgarian and Serbian. He wrote in a Saint Petersburg newspaper that the Macedonians should be recognized by Russia in a full national sense.

Supreme Macedonian-Adrianople Committee leader Boris Sarafov in 1901 stated that Macedonians had a unique "national element" and, the following year, he stated "We the Macedonians are neither Serbs nor Bulgarians, but simply Macedonians... Macedonia exists only for the Macedonians." Gyorche Petrov, another IMRO member, stated Macedonia was a "distinct moral unit" with its own "aspirations", while describing its Slavic population as Bulgarian.

=== National antagonisms and Macedonian separatism ===
==== Macedonian separatism ====
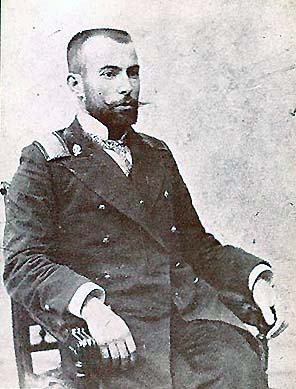
Krste Misirkov in 1903 attempted to codify a standard Macedonian language and appealed for eventual recognition of a separate Macedonian nation when the necessary historical circumstances would arise.

In 1903, Krste Misirkov published in Sofia his book On Macedonian Matters, wherein he laid down the principles of the modern Macedonian nationhood and language. This book, written in the standardized central dialect of Macedonia, is considered by ethnic Macedonians as a milestone of the process of Macedonian awakening. Misirkov argued that the dialect of central Macedonia (Veles-Prilep-Bitola-Ohrid) should be adopted as a basis for a standard Macedonian literary language, in which Macedonians should write, study, and worship; the autocephalous Archbishopric of Ohrid should be restored; and the Slavic people of Macedonia should be recognized as a separate ethnic community, when the necessary historical circumstances would arise.

Another major figure of the Macedonian awakening was Dimitrija Čupovski, one of the founders of the Macedonian Literary Society, established in Saint Petersburg in 1902. One of the members was also Krste Misirkov. In 1905 the Society published Vardar, the first scholarly, scientific and literary journal in the central dialects of Macedonia, which later would contribute in the standardization of Macedonian language. In 1913, the Macedonian Literary Society submitted the Memorandum of Independence of Macedonia to the British Foreign Secretary and other European ambassadors, and it was printed in many European newspapers. In the period 1913–1914, Čupovski published the newspaper Македонскi Голосъ (Macedonian Voice) in which he and fellow members of the Saint Petersburg Macedonian Colony propagated the existence of a Macedonian people separate from the Greeks, Bulgarians and Serbs, and sought to popularize the idea for an independent Macedonian state.

==== The "Macedonian Slavs" in cartography ====
From 1878 until 1918, most independent European observers viewed the Slavs of Macedonia as Bulgarians or as Macedonian Slavs, while their association with Bulgaria was almost universally accepted. Original manuscript versions of population data mentioned "Macedonian Slavs", though the term was changed to "Bulgarians" in the official printing. Western publications usually presented the Slavs of Macedonia as Bulgarians, as happened, partly for political reasons, in Serbian ones. Prompted by the publication of a Serbian map by Spiridon Gopčević claiming the Slavs of Macedonia as Serbs, a version of a Russian map, published in 1891, in a period of deterioration of Bulgarian-Russian relations, first presented Macedonia inhabited not by Bulgarians, but by Macedonian Slavs. Austrian-Hungarian maps followed suit in an effort to delegitimize the ambitions of Russophile Bulgaria, returning to presenting the Macedonian Slavs as Bulgarians when Austria-Bulgaria relations ameliorated, only to renege and employ the designation "Macedonian Slavs" when Bulgaria changed its foreign policy and Austria turned to envisaging an autonomous Macedonia under Austrian influence within the Murzsteg process.

The term "Macedonian Slavs" was used either as a middle solution between conflicting Serbian and Bulgarian claims, to denote an intermediary grouping of Slavs, associated with the Bulgarians, or to describe a separate Slavic group with no ethnic, national or political affiliation. The differentiation of ethnographic maps representing rival national views produced to satisfy the curiosity of European audience for the inhabitants of Macedonia, after the Ilinden uprising of 1903, indicated the complexity of the issue. Influenced by the conclusions of the research of young Serb Jovan Cvijić, that Macedonia's culture combined Byzantine influence with Serbian traditions, a map of 1903 by Austrian cartographer Karl Peucker depicted Macedonia as a peculiar area, where zones of linguistic influence overlapped. In his first ethnographic map of 1906, Cvijic presented all Slavs of Serbia and Macedonia merely as "Slavs". In a pamphlet translated and circulated in Europe the same year, he elaborated his ostensibly impartial views and described the Slavs living south of the Babuna and Plačkovica mountains as "Macedo-Slavs" arguing that the appellation "Bugari" meant simply "peasant" to them, that they had no national consciousness and could become Serbs or Bulgarians in the future. Cvijić thus transformed the political character of the IMRO's appeals to "Macedonians" into an ethnic one. Bulgarian cartographer Anastas Ishirkov countered Cvijić's views, pointing to the involvement of Macedonian Slavs in Bulgarian nationalist uprisings and the Macedonian origins of Bulgarian nationalists before 1878. Although Cvijic's arguments attracted the attention of Great Powers, they did not endorse at the time his view on the Macedo-Slavs.

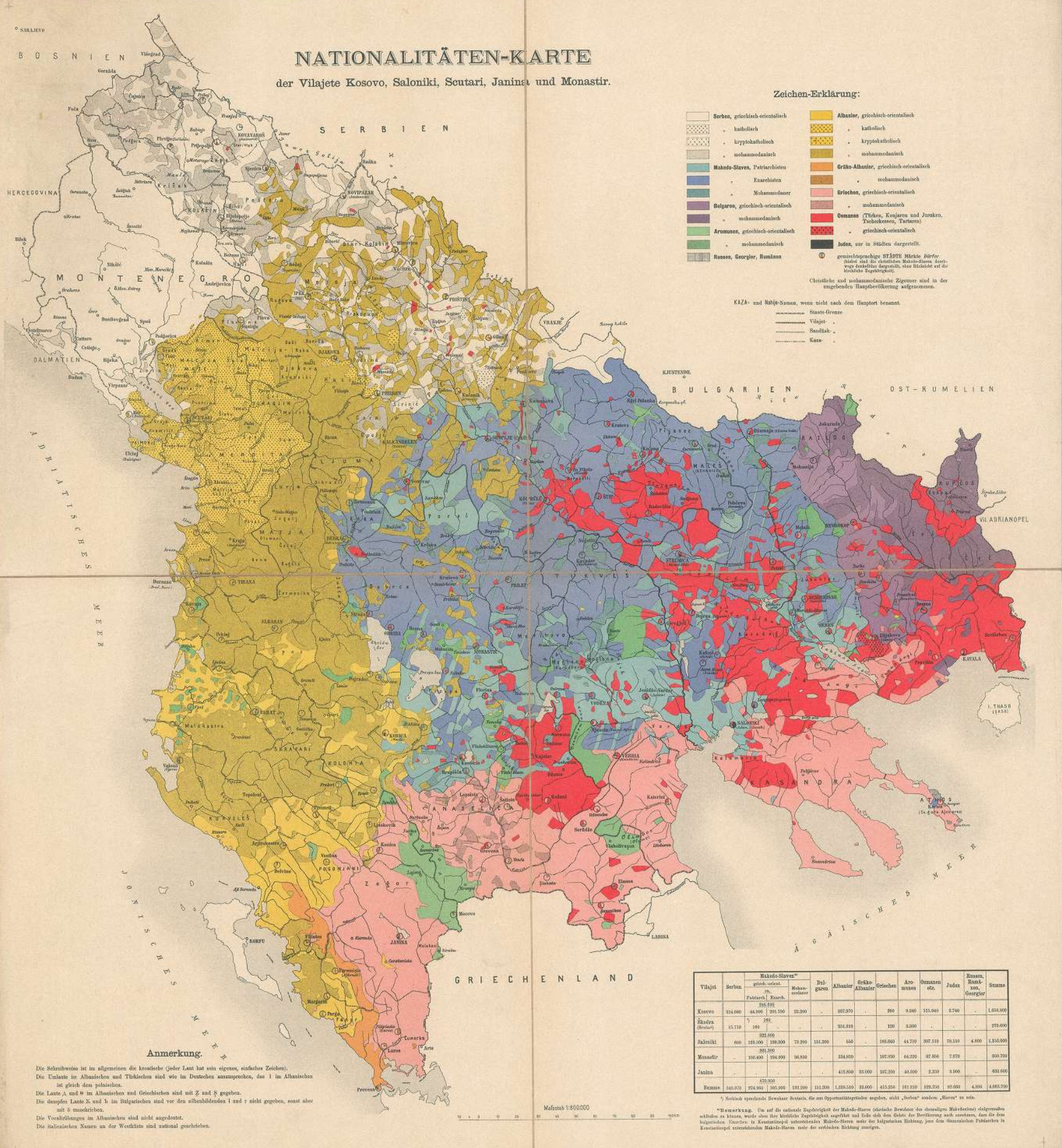
Austrian ethnographic map of the vilayets of Kosovo, Saloniki, Scutari, Janina and Monastir, ca. 1900.

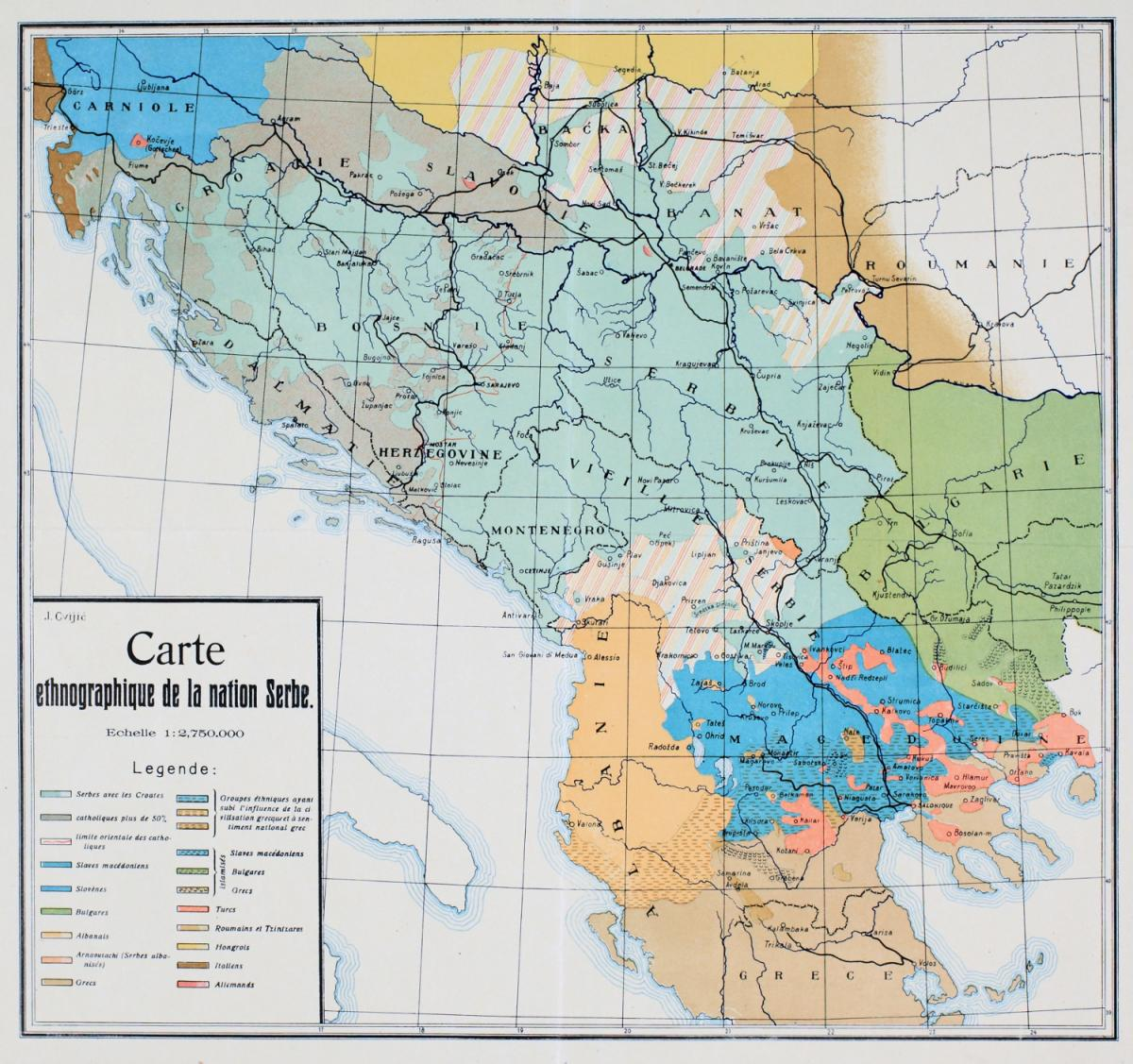
Ethnographic map of the Balkans from the Serbian author Jovan Cvijić (1909)

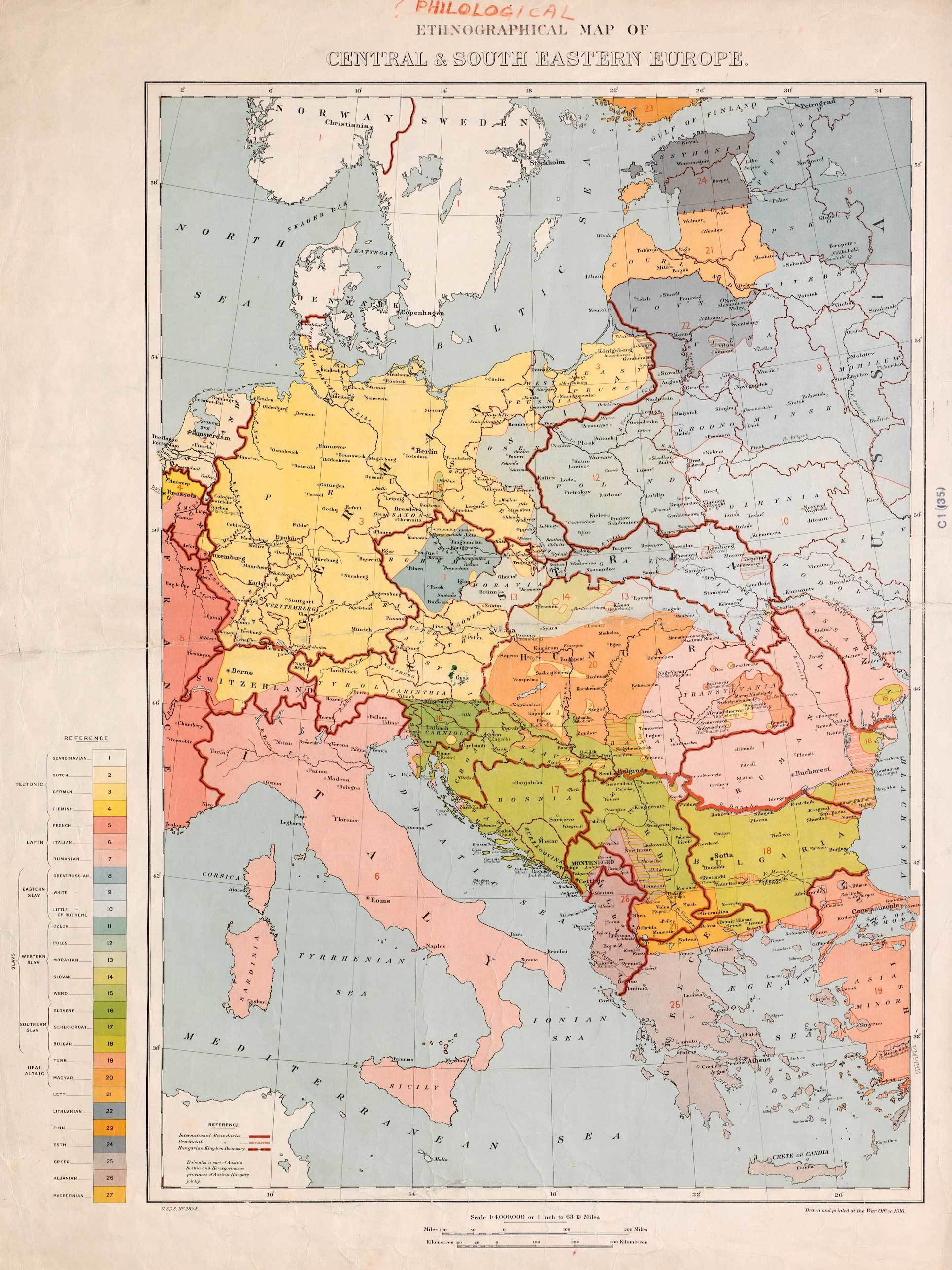
Ethnographical Map of Central and Southeastern Europe - War Office, London (1916)

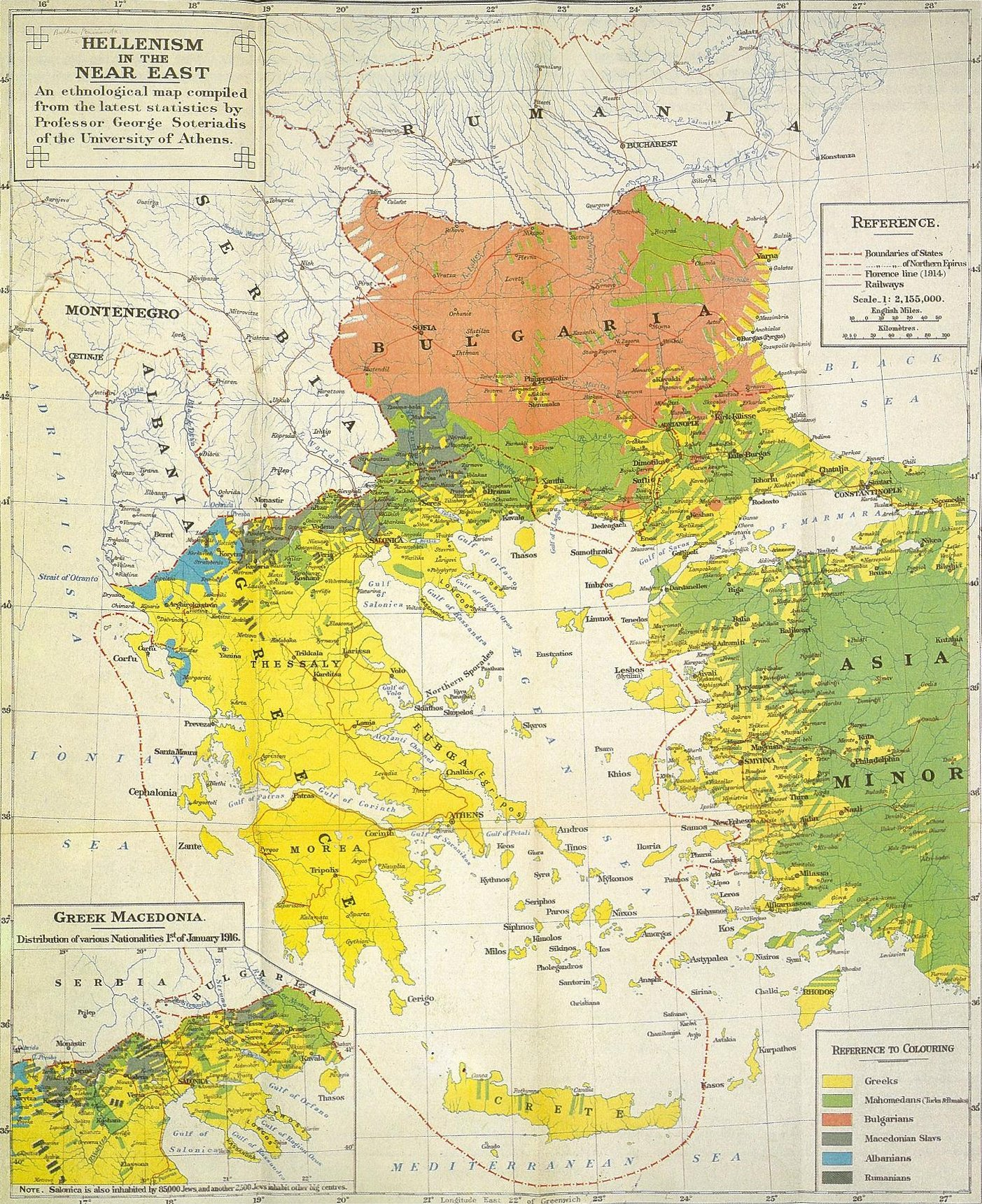
Greek map by Georgios Sotiriadis submitted to the Paris Peace Conference (1919)

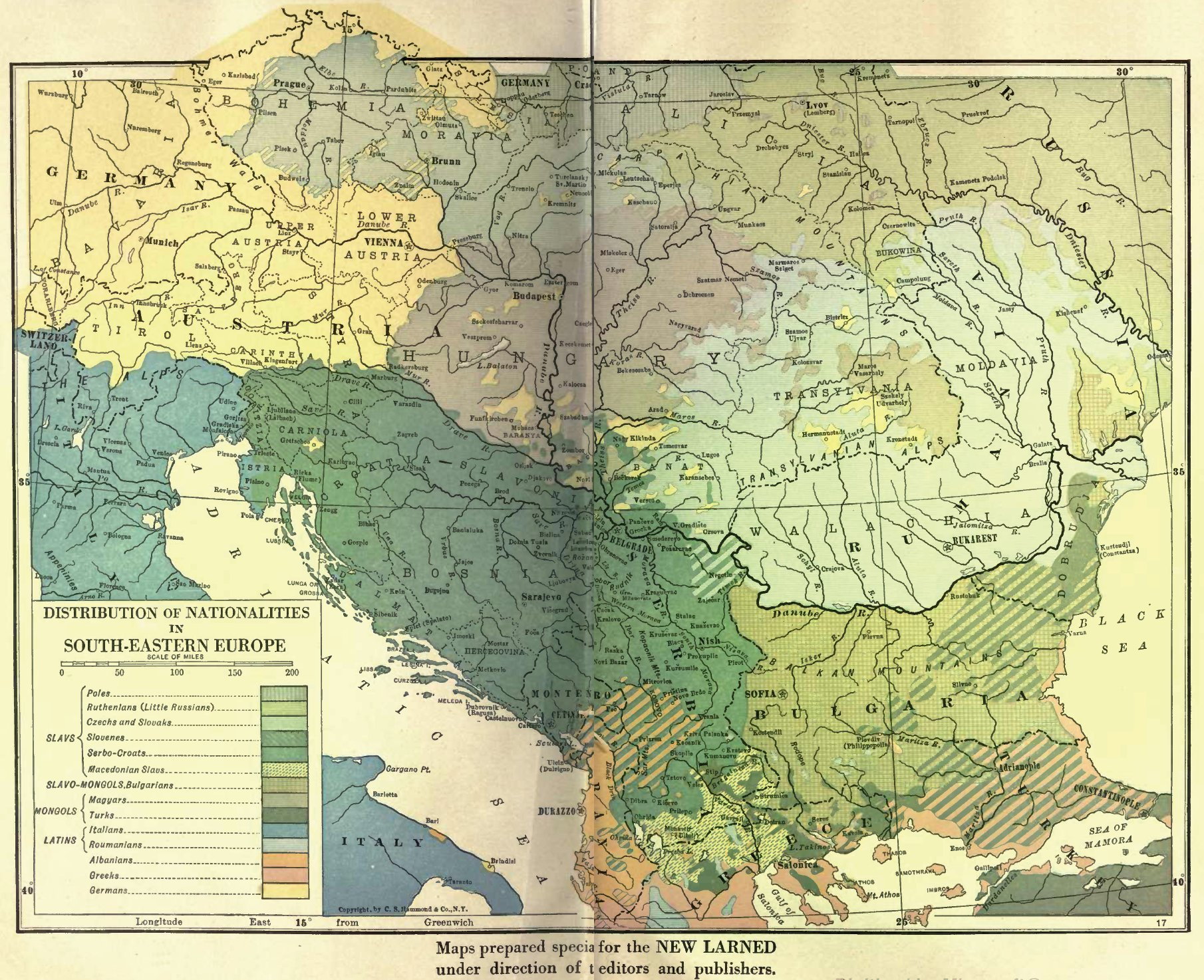
Ethnographic map of the Balkans in the New Larned History (1922)

Cvijić further elaborated the idea that had first appeared in Peucker's map and in his map of 1909 he ingeniously mapped the Macedonian Slavs as a third group distinct from Bulgarians and Serbians, and part of them "under Greek influence". Envisioning a future agreement with Greece, Cvijic depicted the southern half of the Macedo-Slavs "under Greek unfluence", while leaving the rest to appear as a subset of the Serbo-Croats. Cvijić's view was reproduced without acknowledgement by Alfred Stead, with no effect on British opinion, but, reflecting the reorientation of Serbian aims towards dividing Macedonia with Greece, Cvijić eliminated the Macedo-Slavs from a subsequent edition of his map. However, in 1913, before the conclusion of the Treaty of Bucharest he published his third ethnographic map distinguishing the Macedo-Slavs between Skopje and Salonica from both Bulgarians and Serbo-Croats, on the basis of the transitional character of their dialect per the linguistic researches of Vatroslav Jagić and Aleksandar Belić, and the Serb features of their customs, such as the zadruga. For Cvijić, the Macedo-Slavs were a transitional population, with any sense of nationality they displayed being weak, superficial, externally imposed and temporary. Despite arguing that they should be considered neutral, he postulated their division into Serbs and Bulgarians based on dialectical and cultural features in anticipation of Serbian demands regarding the delimitation of frontiers.

A Balkan committee of experts rejected Cvijić's concept of the Macedo-Slavs in 1914. However, Bulgaria's entry into World War I on the side of the Central Powers in 1915, after the Allies failed to convince Serbia to hand over the 'Uncontested Zone' in Macedonia to Bulgaria, precipitated a complete turnaround in the Allies' opinion of Macedonian ethnography, and several British and French maps echoing Cvijić were released within months. Thus, as the Entente approached victory in the First World War, a number other maps and atlases, including those produced by the Allies replicated Cvijić's ideas, especially its depiction of the Macedo-Slavs. The prevalence of the Yugoslav point of view, obliged Georgios Sotiriades, a professor of history at the University of Athens, to map the Macedo-Slavs as a distinct group in his work of 1918, that mirrored Greek views of the time and was used as an official document to advocate for Greece's positions in the Paris peace conference. After World War I, Cvijić's map became the point of reference for all Balkan ethnographic maps, while his concept of Macedo-Slavs was reproduced in almost all maps, including German maps, that acknowledged a Macedonian nation.

=== Macedonian nationalism in the interwar period ===
After the Balkan Wars (1912–1913) and the World War I (1914–1918), following the division of the region of Macedonia amongst the Kingdom of Greece, the Kingdom of Bulgaria and the Kingdom of Serbia, the idea of belonging to a separate Macedonian nation was further spread among the Slavic-speaking population. The suffering during the wars, the endless struggle of the Balkan monarchies for dominance over the population increased the Macedonians' sentiment that the institutionalization of an independent Macedonian nation would put an end to their suffering. On the question of whether they were Serbs or Bulgarians, the people more often started answering: "Neither Bulgar, nor Serb... I am Macedonian only, and I'm sick of war." Stratis Myrivilis noted a specific instance of a Slav-speaking family wanting to be referred to, not as "Bulgar, Srrp, or Grrts", but as "Makedon ortodox". By the 1920s, following a negative reaction to the national proselytization of the previous decades, a majority of Christian Slavs inhabiting Greek and Vardar Macedonia used the collective name "Macedonians" to describe themselves, either as a nation or as a distinct ethnicity. The 1928 Greek census recorded 81,844 Slavo-Macedonian speakers, distinct from 16,755 Bulgarian speakers. In 1924 the Politis–Kalfov Protocol was signed between Greece and Bulgaria, concerning the protection of the Bulgarian minority In Greece. However, it was not ratified by the Greek side, because public opinion stood against the recognition of any "Bulgarian" minority". Prior to the 1930s, "it seems to have been acceptable" for Greeks to refer to Slavs of Macedonia as Macedonians and their language as Macedonian, Ion Dragoumis had argued this viewpoint.

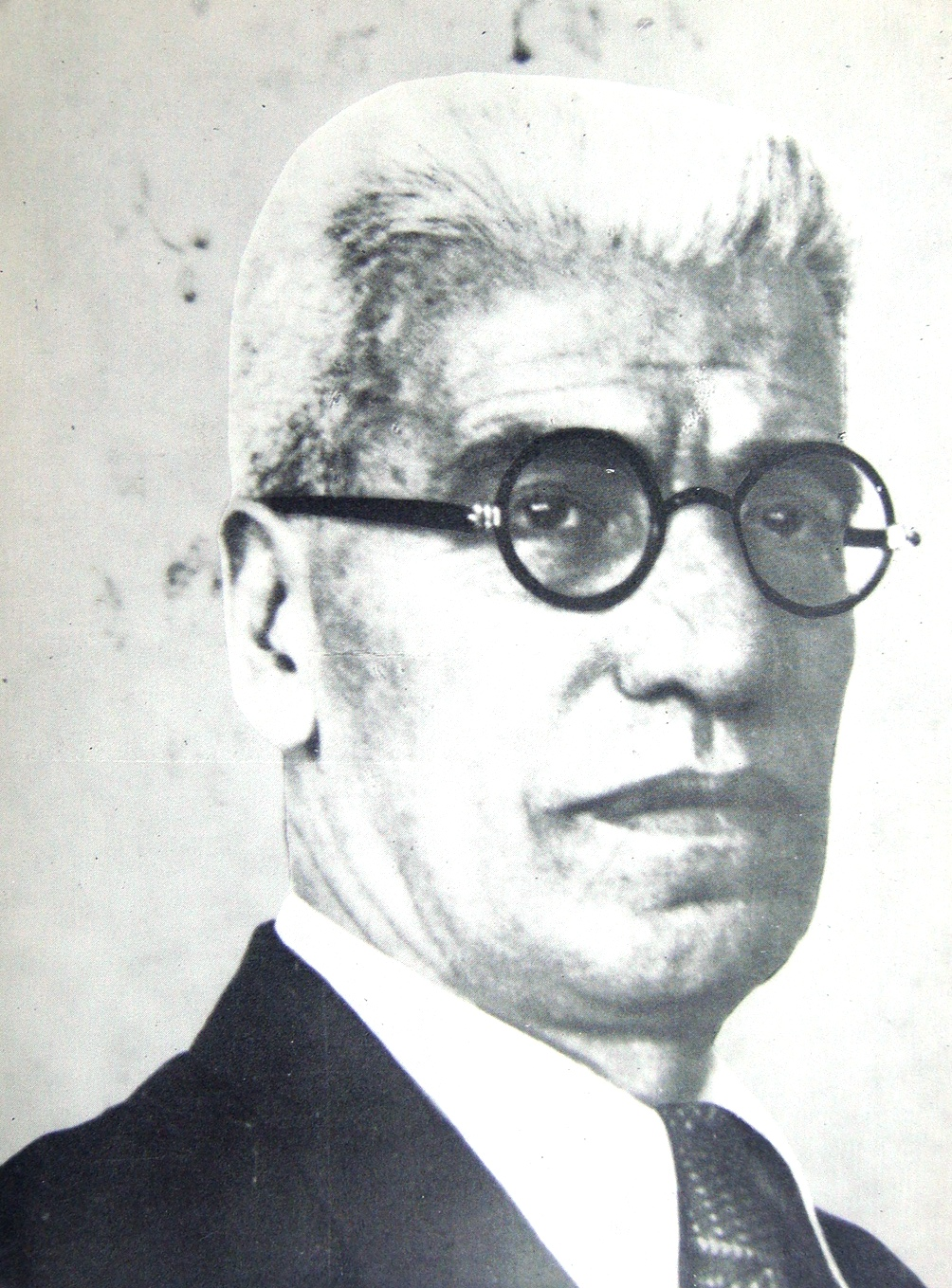
Dimitar Vlahov played a crucial role in the adoption of the Resolution of the Comintern on the Macedonian question that, for the first time by an international organization, recognized the existence of a separate Macedonian nation, in 1934

The consolidation of an international Communist organization (the Comintern) in the 1920s led to some failed attempts by the Communists to use the Macedonian Question as a political weapon. In the 1920 Yugoslav parliamentary elections, 25% of the total Communist vote came from Macedonia, but participation was low (only 55%), mainly because the pro-Bulgarian IMRO organised a boycott against the elections. In the following years, the communists attempted to enlist the pro-IMRO sympathies of the population in their cause. In the context of this attempt, in 1924 the Comintern recognized a separate Macedonian nationality and organized the filed signing of the so-called May Manifesto, in which independence of partitioned Macedonia was required. In 1925 with the help of the Comintern, the Internal Macedonian Revolutionary Organization (United) was created, composed of former left-wing Internal Macedonian Revolutionary Organization (IMRO) members. This organization promoted for the first time in 1932 the existence of a separate ethnic Macedonian nation. In 1933 the Communist Party of Greece, in a series of articles published in its official newspaper, the Rizospastis, criticizing Greek minority policy towards Slavic-speakers in Greek Macedonia, recognized the Slavs of the entire region of Macedonia as forming a distinct Macedonian ethnicity and their language as Macedonian. The idea of a Macedonian nation was internationalized and backed by the Comintern which issued in 1934 a resolution in which Macedonian national identity was recognized. This action was attacked by the IMRO, but was supported by the Balkan communists. The Balkan communist parties supported the national consolidation of the ethnic Macedonian people and created Macedonian sections within the parties, headed by prominent IMRO (United) members.

=== World War II and Yugoslav nation-state building ===
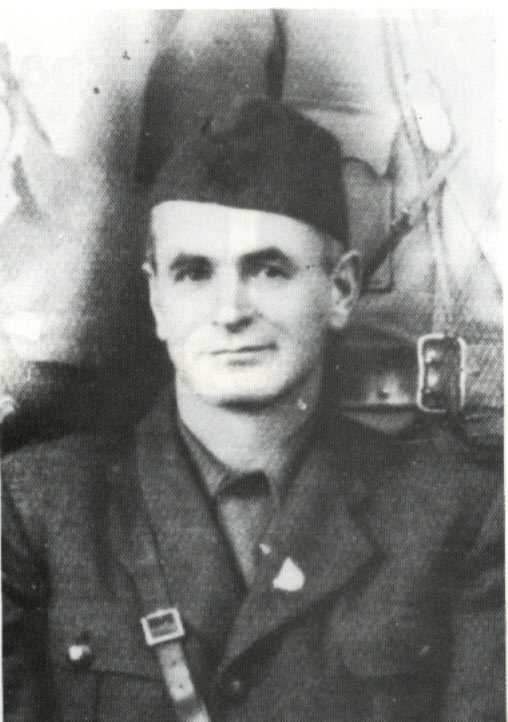
Metodija Andonov-Čento was the first president of the Yugoslav Republic of Macedonia after the Second World War.

The available data indicates that despite the policy of assimilation, pro-Bulgarian sentiments among the Macedonian Slavs in Yugoslavia were still sizable during the interwar period as a result of the repressive Serbianisation policy. (Note: See:) Soon after the Bulgarian occupation, the authorities realized that only part of the Slavic Macedonians felt Bulgarian or was pro-Bulgarian. Because of that, the Bulgarian authorities initiated a program of intense Bulgarisation. Although a Macedonian national consciousness was growing as well, until then it was espoused only by some intellectual circles. The sense of belonging to a separate Macedonian nation gained credence during World War II when ethnic Macedonian communist partisan movement was formed. The Yugoslav communists recognized the existence of a Macedonian nationality during WWII to quiet fears of the Macedonian population that a communist Yugoslavia would continue to implement the former policy of Serbianization. Harsh treatment by occupying Bulgarian troops reduced the pro-Bulgarian orientation of the Macedonian Slavs even more, which made them embrace the emerging Macedonian identity. The wartime Bulgarisation policies, national chauvinism and suffering backlash, led even some anti-Yugoslav Macedonians that returned from exile to seek allies among the communists. In 1943 the Communist Party of Macedonia was established and the resistance movement grew up. After the World War II ethnic Macedonian institutions were created in the three parts of the region of Macedonia, then under communist control, including the establishment of the People's Republic of Macedonia within the Socialist Federal Republic of Yugoslavia (SFRJ). The codification of Macedonian language and the recognition of the Macedonian nation had as a main goal to finally subvert the Bulgarian irredentism towards Yugoslav Macedonia, as well the claims that Macedonians are Bulgarians, the same applying to the Serbian claims that Macedonians were Serbs, and their Greater Serbia idea. The overwhelming majority of the Slavic population in Macedonia accepted the emerging Macedonian national identity without a problem. As a result, Yugoslavia subdued the pro-Bulgarian feeling among parts of its population. Bulgarian sources claim around 100,000 pro-Bulgarian elements were imprisoned for violations of the special Law for the Protection of Macedonian National Honour, and 1,260 were allegedly killed. However, these figures have been questioned by some Bulgarian researchers, also noting that the assertion that these individuals were persecuted and killed solely on account of their Bulgarian national consciousness is deceptive.

=== Post-independence ===
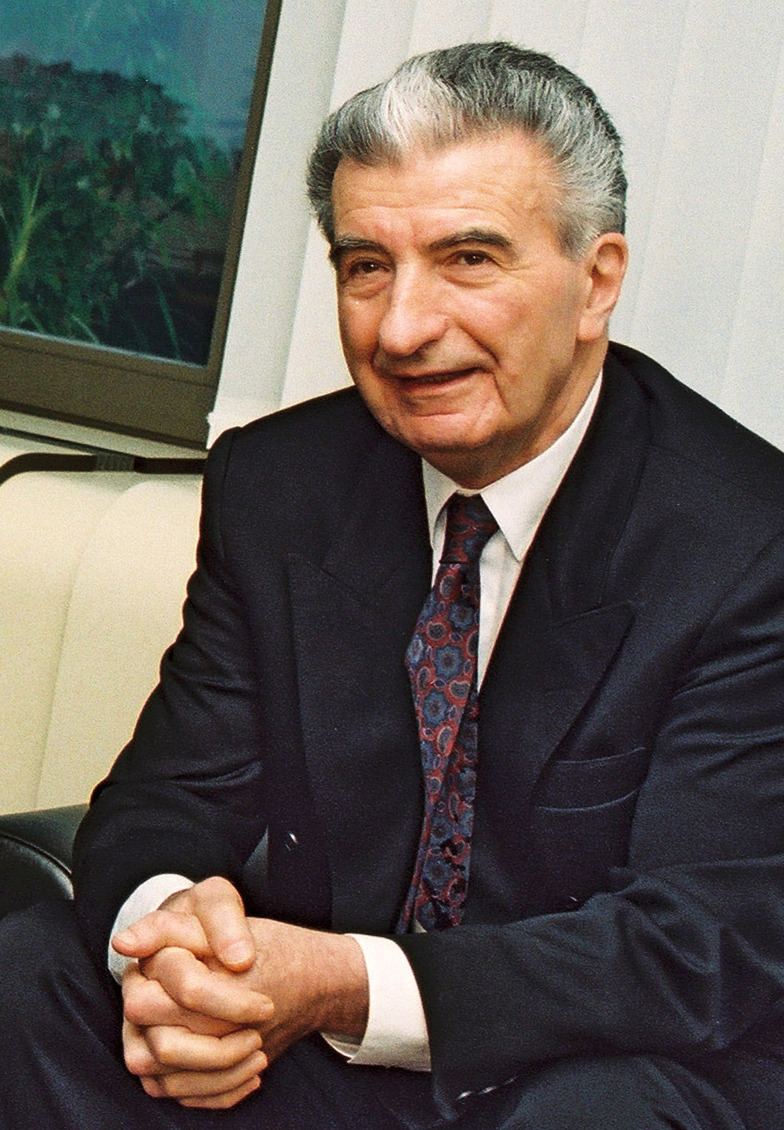
Kiro Gligorov was the first president of the Republic of Macedonia (now North Macedonia) after the breakup of Yugoslavia in 1991.

Following the collapse of Yugoslavia, the issue of Macedonian identity emerged again. Nationalists and governments alike from neighbouring countries, especially Greece and Bulgaria, espouse the view that the Macedonian ethnicity is a modern, artificial creation. Such views have been seen by Macedonian historians to represent irredentist motives on Macedonian territory. Moreover, some historians point out that all modern nations are recent, politically motivated constructs based on creation "myths", that the creation of Macedonian identity is "no more or less artificial than any other identity", and that, contrary to the claims of Romantic nationalists, modern, territorially bound and mutually exclusive nation-states have little in common with their preceding large territorial or dynastic medieval empires, and any connection between them is tenuous at best. In any event, irrespective of shifting political affiliations, the Macedonian Slavs shared in the fortunes of the Byzantine commonwealth and the Rum millet and they can claim them as their heritage. Loring Danforth states similarly, the ancient heritage of modern Balkan countries is not "the mutually exclusive property of one specific nation" but "the shared inheritance of all Balkan peoples".

Following the Greek veto on the 21st NATO Summit in 2008, the then ruling party VMRO-DPMNE pursued a policy called "Antiquisation" by its critics. Proponents of this view see modern Macedonians as direct descendants of the ancient Macedonians. This view faces criticism by academics as it is not supported by archaeology or other historical disciplines and also could marginalize the Macedonian identity. Surveys on the effects of the controversial nation-building project Skopje 2014 and on the perceptions of the population of Skopje revealed a high degree of uncertainty regarding the latter's national identity. A supplementary national poll showed that there was a great discrepancy between the population's sentiment and the narrative the state sought to promote.

Additionally, during the last two decades, tens of thousands of citizens of North Macedonia have applied for Bulgarian citizenship. In the period since 2000 more than 100,000 acquired it, while ca. 50,000 applied and are still waiting. Bulgaria has a special ethnic dual-citizenship regime which makes a constitutional distinction between ethnic Bulgarians and Bulgarian citizens. In the case of the Macedonians, merely declaring their national identity as Bulgarian is enough to gain a citizenship. By making the procedure simpler, Bulgaria stimulates more Macedonian citizens (of Slavic origin) to apply for a Bulgarian citizenship. However, many Macedonians who apply for Bulgarian citizenship as Bulgarians by origin, have few ties with Bulgaria. In 2018, Bulgaria faced a scandal over the alleged sale of citizenship documents. Former Citizenship Council director Katya Mateva exposed a scheme in which the State Agency for Bulgarians Abroad (SABA) issued thousands of falsified certificates of Bulgarian origin to Macedonians and Albanians in exchange for bribes. Following the scandal, certification of Bulgarian origin shifted to an executive agency for Bulgarians abroad, under the Ministry of Foreign Affairs and the Ministry of Interior. Since then, the number of Macedonian applicants has dropped significantly. Further, those applying for Bulgarian citizenship usually say they do so to gain access to member states of the European Union rather than to assert Bulgarian identity. This phenomenon is called placebo identity. Some Macedonians view the Bulgarian policy as part of a strategy to destabilize the Macedonian national identity. Similarly, some researchers have described this policy as a form of passportization, claiming that its purpose is the Bulgarisation of Macedonians. As a nation engaged in a dispute over its distinctiveness from Bulgarians, Macedonians have always perceived themselves as threatened by their neighbor. Bulgaria insists its neighbor admit the common historical roots of their languages and nations, a view Skopje continues to reject. As a result, Bulgaria blocked the official start of EU accession talks with North Macedonia.

Despite sizable number of Macedonians that have acquired Bulgarian citizenship since 2002 (ca. 10% of the Slavic population), only 3,504 citizens of North Macedonia declared themselves as ethnic Bulgarians in the 2021 census (roughly 0.31% from the Slavic population), which was observed and welcomed by the European Commission. This discrepancy demonstrates that Macedonian applicants are primarily motivated by access to an EU passport rather than by Bulgarian ethnic identity. The Bulgarian side does not accept these results as completely objective, citing as an example the census has counted less than 20,000 people with Bulgarian citizenship in the country, while in fact they are over 100,000.

== Ethnonym ==
The national name derives from the Greek term Makedonía, related to the name of the region, named after the ancient Macedonians and their kingdom. It originates from the ancient Greek adjective makednos, meaning "tall", which shares its roots with the adjective makrós, meaning the same. The name is originally believed to have meant either "highlanders" or "the tall ones", possibly descriptive of these ancient people.

During the early modern era, some Dalmatian pan-Slavic ideologists like Mavro Orbini believed that the ancient Macedonians were Slavs. Under these influences in 19th century some intellectuals in the region developed the idea of direct link between the local Slavs, the early Slavs and the ancient Macedonians. With the conquest of the Balkans by the Ottomans in the late 14th century, the name of Macedonia disappeared as a geographical designation for several centuries. The name was revived just during the early 19th century, after the foundation of the modern Greek state with its Western Europe-derived obsession with ancient history. As a result of the rise of nationalism in the Ottoman Empire, massive Greek religious and school propaganda occurred which led to some "Macedonization" among Slavic-speaking population of the area. Accordingly, the name Macedonians was applied to the local Slavs, aiming to stimulate the development of close ties between them and the Greeks, linking both sides to the ancient Macedonians, as a counteract against the growing Bulgarian cultural influence into the region and the Bulgarian Exarchate propaganda. Since the 1850s the Macedonian Slavic intellectuals adopted it as a regional identity, and this name began to gain popularity, and some of them would drew from it to imagine an ethnic Macedonian nation, which would eventually come to fruition in 1944.

== Population ==
The vast majority of Macedonians live along the valley of the river Vardar, the central region of the Republic of North Macedonia. They form about 64.18% of the population of North Macedonia (1,297,981 people according to the 2002 census). Smaller numbers live in eastern Albania, northern Greece, and southern Serbia, mostly abutting the border areas of the Republic of North Macedonia. A large number of Macedonians have immigrated overseas to Australia, the United States, Canada, New Zealand and to many European countries: Germany, Italy, Sweden, the United Kingdom, and Austria among others.

=== Balkans ===
==== Greece ====
The existence of an ethnic Macedonian minority in Greece is rejected by the Greek government. The number of people speaking Slavic dialects has been estimated at somewhere between 10,000 and 250,000. (Note: See:) Most of these people however do not have an ethnic Macedonian national consciousness, with most choosing to identify as ethnic Greeks or rejecting both ethnic designations and preferring terms such as "natives" instead. In 1999 the Greek Helsinki Monitor estimated that the number of people identifying as ethnic Macedonians numbered somewhere between 10,000 and 30,000, Macedonian sources generally claim the number of ethnic Macedonians living in Greece at somewhere between 200,000 and 350,000. The ethnic Macedonians in Greece have faced difficulties from the Greek government in their ability to self-declare as members of a "Macedonian minority" and to refer to their native language as "Macedonian".

Since the late 1980s there has been an ethnic Macedonian revival in Northern Greece, mostly centering on the region of Florina. Since then ethnic Macedonian organisations including the Rainbow political party have been established. Rainbow first opened its offices in Florina on 6 September 1995. The following day, the offices had been broken into and had been ransacked. Later Members of Rainbow had been charged for "causing and inciting mutual hatred among the citizens" because the party had bilingual signs written in both Greek and Macedonian. On 20 October 2005, the European Convention on Human Rights (ECHR) ordered the Greek government to pay penalties to the Rainbow Party for violations of 2 ECHR articles. Rainbow has seen limited success at a national level, its best result being achieved in the 1994 European elections, with a total of 7,263 votes. Since 2004 it has participated in European Parliament elections and local elections, but not in national elections. A few of its members have been elected in local administrative posts. Rainbow has recently re-established Nova Zora, a newspaper that was first published for a short period in the mid-1990s, with reportedly 20,000 copies being distributed free of charge.

==== Serbia ====
Within Serbia, Macedonians constitute an officially recognised ethnic minority at both a local and national level. Within Vojvodina, Macedonians are recognised under the Statute of the Autonomous Province of Vojvodina, along with other ethnic groups. Large Macedonian settlements within Vojvodina can be found in Plandište, Jabuka, Glogonj, Dužine and Kačarevo. These people are mainly the descendants of economic migrants who left the Socialist Republic of Macedonia in the 1950s and 1960s. The Macedonians in Serbia are represented by a national council and in recent years Macedonian has begun to be taught. The most recent census recorded 22,755 Macedonians living in Serbia.

==== Albania ====
Macedonians represent the second largest ethnic minority population in Albania. Albania recognises the existence of a Macedonian minority within the Mala Prespa region, most of which is comprised by Pustec Municipality. Macedonians have full minority rights within this region, including the right to education and the provision of other services in Macedonian. There also exist unrecognised Macedonian populations living in the Golo Brdo region, the "Dolno Pole" area near the town of Peshkopi, around Lake Ohrid and Korçë as well as in Gora. 4,697 people declared themselves Macedonians in the 1989 census.

==== Bulgaria ====
Bulgarians are considered most closely related to the neighboring Macedonians, and it is sometimes claimed that there is no clear ethnic difference between them. A total of 1,143 people officially declared themselves to be ethnic Macedonians in the last Bulgarian census in 2021. During the same year, there were five times as many Bulgarian residents born in North Macedonia, 5,450. Most of them held Bulgarian citizenship, with only 1,576 of them being citizens of the Republic of North Macedonia. According to the 2011 Bulgarian census, there were 561 ethnic Macedonians (0.2%) in the Blagoevgrad Province, the Bulgarian part of the geographical region of Macedonia, out of a total of 1,654 Macedonians in the entire country. Also, a total of 429 citizens of the Republic of North Macedonia resided in the province.

In 1998, Krassimir Kanev, chairman of the non-governmental organization Bulgarian Helsinki Committee, claimed that there were 15,000–25,000 ethnic Macedonians in Bulgaria (see here). According to the Bulgarian Helsinki Committee, the vast majority of the Slavic-speaking population in Pirin Macedonia had a Bulgarian national self-consciousness and a regional Macedonian identity similar to the Macedonian regional identity in Greek Macedonia. According to ethnic Macedonian political activist, Stoyko Stoykov, the number of Bulgarian citizens with ethnic Macedonian self-consciousness in 2009 was between 5,000 and 10,000. In 2000, the Bulgarian Constitutional Court banned UMO Ilinden-Pirin, a small Macedonian political party, as a separatist organization. Subsequently, activists attempted to re-establish the party but could not gather the required number of signatures.

Macedonians in North Macedonia, according to the 2002 census

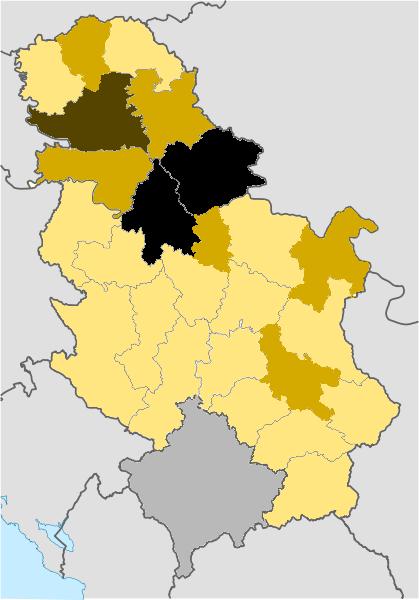
Concentration of Macedonians in Serbia

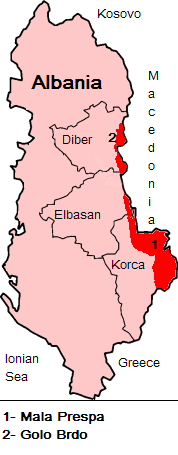
Regions where Macedonians live within Albania

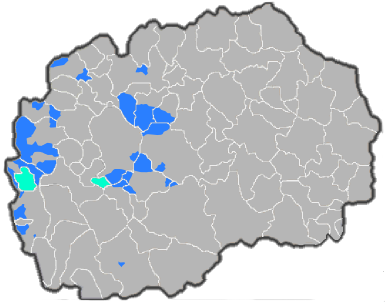
Macedonian Muslims in North Macedonia

=== Diaspora ===
Macedonian diaspora in the world (includes people with Macedonian ancestry or citizenship). North Macedonia + 100,000 + 10,000 + 1,000

Significant Macedonian communities can also be found in the traditional immigrant-receiving nations, as well as in Western European countries. Census data in many European countries (such as Italy and Germany) does not take into account the ethnicity of émigrés from the Republic of North Macedonia.

==== Argentina ====
Most Macedonians can be found in Buenos Aires, the Pampas and Córdoba. An estimated 30,000 Macedonians can be found in Argentina.

==== Australia ====
The official number of Macedonians in Australia by birthplace or birthplace of parents is 83,893 (2001). The main Macedonian communities are found in Melbourne, Geelong, Sydney, Wollongong, Newcastle, Canberra and Perth. The 2006 census recorded 83,983 people of Macedonian ancestry and the 2011 census recorded 93,570 people of Macedonian ancestry.

==== Brazil ====
An estimated 45,000 people in Brazil are of Macedonian ancestry. The Macedonians can be primarily found in Porto Alegre, Rio de Janeiro, São Paulo and Curitiba.

==== Canada ====
The Canadian census in 2001 records 37,705 individuals claimed wholly or partly Macedonian heritage in Canada, although community spokesmen have claimed that there are actually 100,000–150,000 Macedonians in Canada.

==== United States ====
A significant Macedonian community can be found in the United States. The official number of Macedonians in the US is 49,455 (2004). The Macedonian community is located mainly in Michigan, New York, Ohio, Indiana and New Jersey.

==== Germany ====
There are an estimated 61,000 citizens of North Macedonia in Germany (mostly in the Ruhrgebiet) (2001). According to data from the Federal Statistical Office of Germany, 117,969 citizens of North Macedonia were living in Germany at the end of 2020.

==== Italy ====
There are 74,162 citizens of North Macedonia in Italy (Foreign Citizens in Italy).

==== Switzerland ====
In 2006 the Swiss Government recorded 60,362 Macedonian Citizens living in Switzerland.

==== Romania ====
Macedonians are an officially recognised minority group in Romania. They have a special reserved seat in the nation's parliament. In 2002, they numbered 731.

==== Slovenia ====
Macedonians began relocating to Slovenia in the 1950s when the two regions formed a part of a single country, Yugoslavia.

==== United Kingdom ====
The 2011 UK Census recorded a total of 2,983 Macedonians who stated that their country of birth was North Macedonia.

==== Other countries ====
Sizeable Macedonian communities can also be found in Turkey, as well as in the European Union countries, like the Netherlands, Austria and France.

== Culture ==
The culture of the people is characterized with both traditionalist and modernist attributes. It is strongly bound with their native land and the surroundings in which they live. The rich cultural heritage of the Macedonians is accented in the folklore, the picturesque traditional folk costumes, decorations and ornaments in city and village homes, the architecture, the monasteries and churches, iconostasis, wood-carving and so on. The culture of Macedonians can roughly be explained as Balkanic, closely related to that of Bulgarians and Serbs.

=== Architecture ===
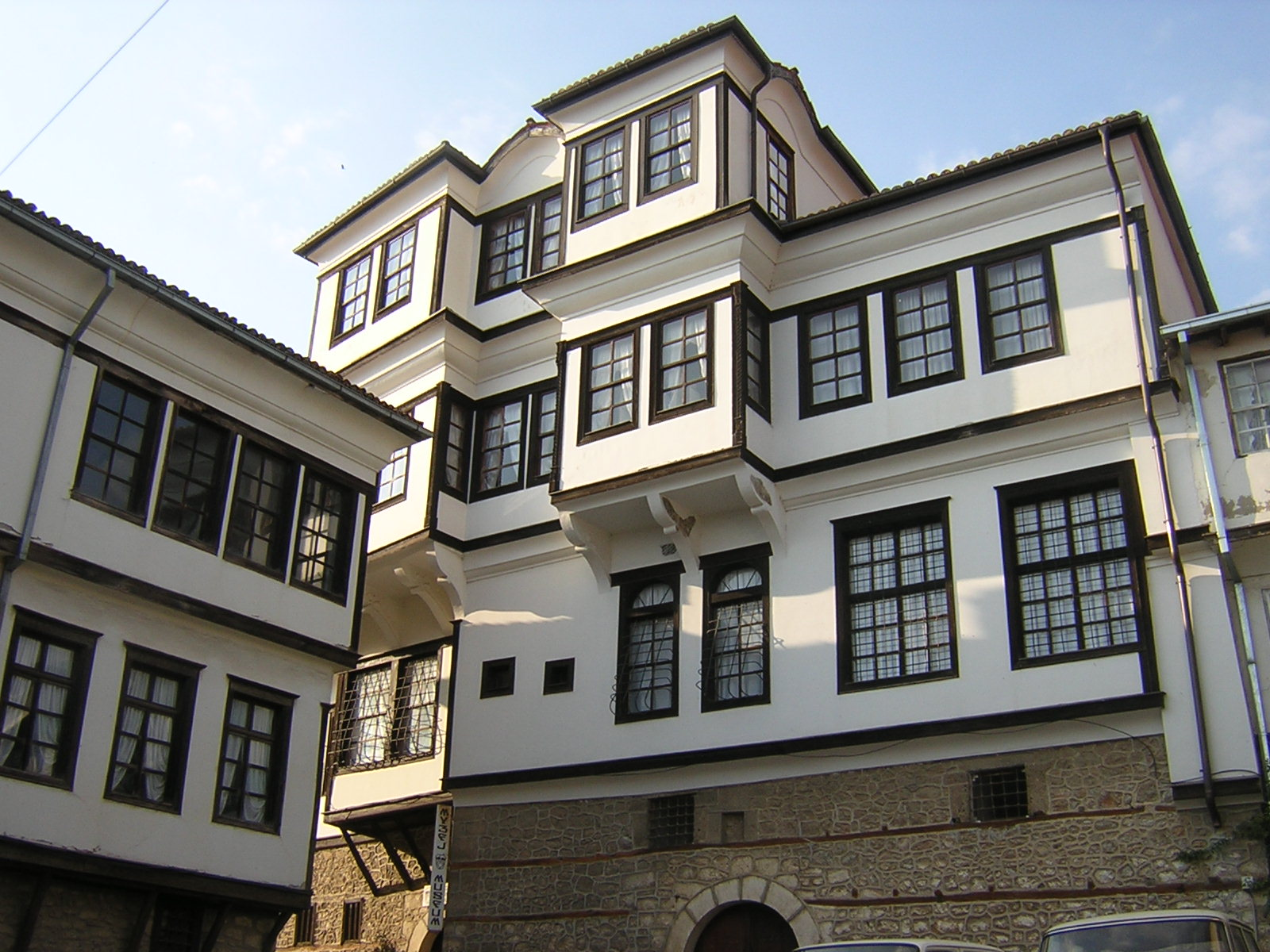
Ottoman architecture in Ohrid.

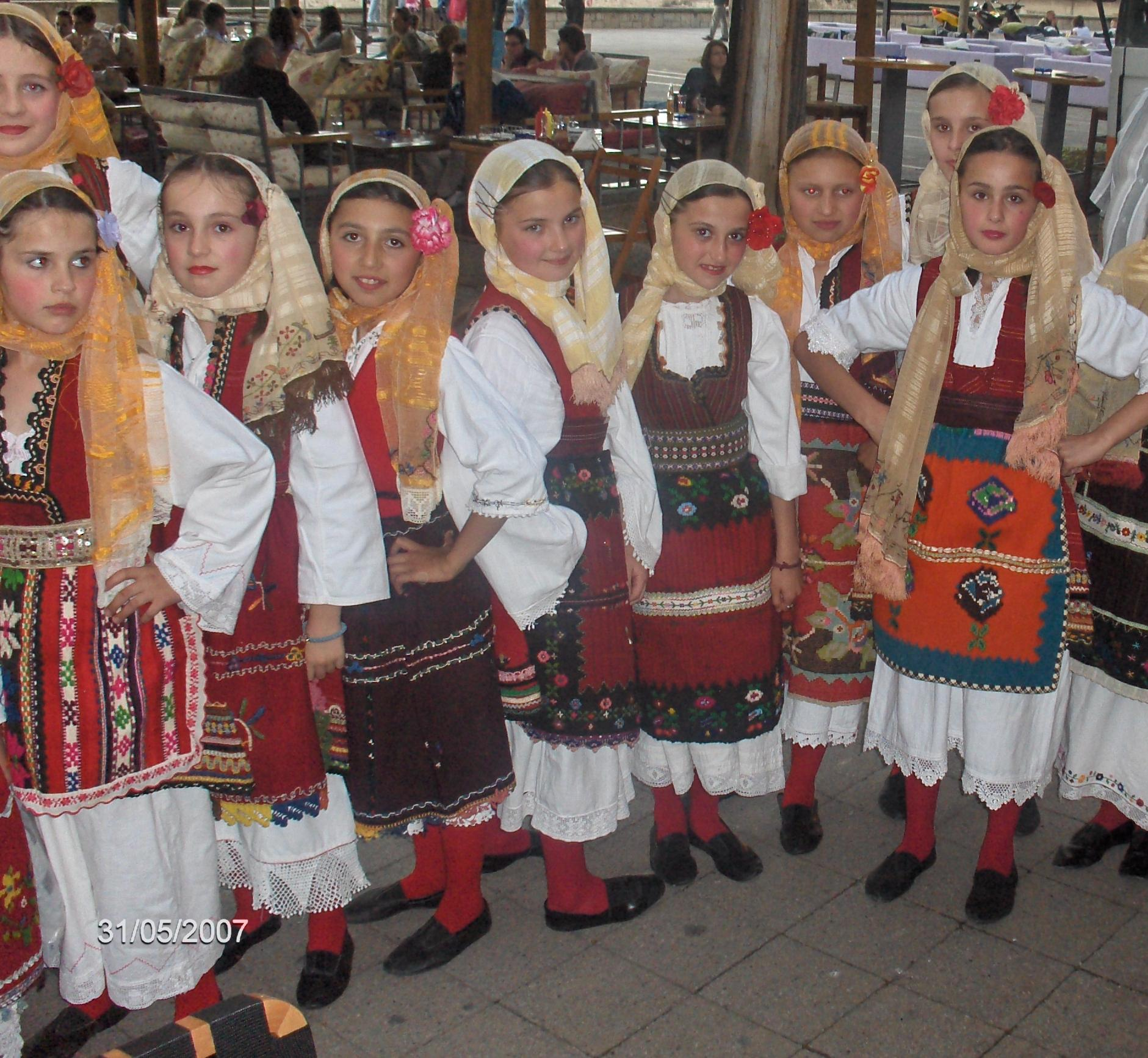
Macedonian girls in traditional folk costumes.

The typical Macedonian village house is influenced by Ottoman Architecture. Presented as a construction with two floors, with a hard facade composed of large stones and a wide balcony on the second floor. In villages with predominantly agricultural economy, the first floor was often used as a storage for the harvest, while in some villages the first floor was used as a cattle-pen.

The stereotype for a traditional Macedonian city house is a two-floor building with white façade, with a forward extended second floor, and black wooden elements around the windows and on the edges.

=== Cinema and theater ===
The history of film making in North Macedonia dates back over 110 years. The first film to be produced on the territory of the present-day the country was made in 1895 by Janaki and Milton Manaki in Bitola. In 1995 Before the Rain became the first Macedonian movie to be nominated for an Academy Award.

From 1993 to 1994, 1,596 performances were held in the newly formed republic, and more than 330,000 people attended. The Macedonian National Theater (drama, opera, and ballet companies), the Drama Theater, the Theater of the Nationalities (Albanian and Turkish drama companies) and the other theater companies comprise about 870 professional actors, singers, ballet dancers, directors, playwrights, set and costume designers, etc. There is also a professional theatre for children and three amateur theaters. For the last thirty years a traditional festival of Macedonian professional theaters has been taking place in Prilep in honor of Vojdan Černodrinski, the founder of the modern Macedonian theater. Each year a festival of amateur and experimental Macedonian theater companies is held in Kočani.

=== Music and art ===
Macedonian music has many things in common with the music of neighboring Balkan countries, but maintains its own distinctive sound.

The founders of modern Macedonian painting included Lazar Licenovski, Nikola Martinoski, Dimitar Pandilov, and Vangel Kodzoman. They were succeeded by an exceptionally talented and fruitful generation, consisting of Borka Lazeski, Dimitar Kondovski, Petar Mazev who are now deceased, and Rodoljub Anastasov and many others who are still active. Others include: Vasko Taskovski and Vangel Naumovski. In addition to Dimo Todorovski, who is considered to be the founder of modern Macedonian sculpture, the works of Petar Hadzi Boskov, Boro Mitrikeski, Novak Dimitrovski and Tome Serafimovski are also outstanding.

=== Economy ===
In the past, the Macedonian population was predominantly involved with agriculture, with a very small portion of the people who were engaged in trade (mainly in the cities). But after the creation of the People's Republic of Macedonia which started a social transformation based on Socialist principles, middle and heavy industries were started.

=== Language ===
Macedonian (македонски јазик) is a member of the Eastern group of South Slavic languages. Standard Macedonian was implemented as the official language of the Socialist Republic of Macedonia after being codified in the 1940s, and has accumulated a thriving literary tradition.

The closest relative of Macedonian is Bulgarian, followed by Serbo-Croatian. All the South Slavic languages form a dialect continuum, in which Macedonian and Bulgarian form an Eastern subgroup. The Torlakian dialect group is intermediate between Bulgarian, Macedonian and Serbian, comprising some of the northernmost dialects of Macedonian as well as varieties spoken in southern Serbia and western Bulgaria. Torlakian is often classified as part of the Eastern South Slavic dialects.

The Macedonian alphabet is an adaptation of the Cyrillic script, as well as language-specific conventions of spelling and punctuation. It is rarely Romanized.

=== Religion ===
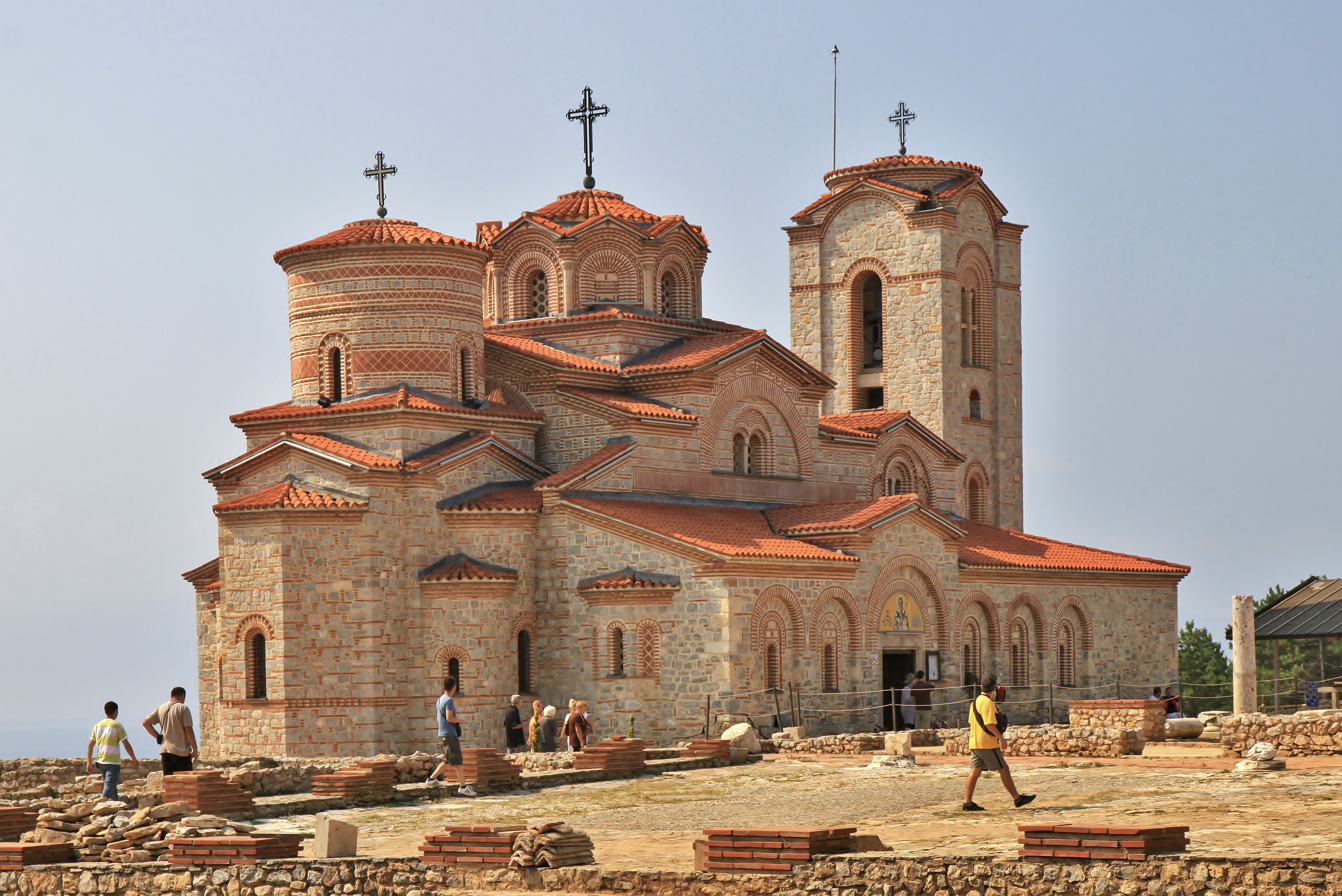
One of the well-known monasteries – St. Panteleimon in Ohrid.

Most Macedonians are members of the Macedonian Orthodox Church. The official name of the church is Macedonian Orthodox Church – Ohrid Archbishopric and is the body of Christians who are united under the Archbishop of Ohrid and Macedonia, exercising jurisdiction over Macedonian Orthodox Christians in the Republic of North Macedonia and in exarchates in the Macedonian diaspora.

The church gained autonomy from the Serbian Orthodox Church in 1959 and declared the restoration of the historic Archbishopric of Ohrid. On 19 July 1967, the Macedonian Orthodox Church declared autocephaly from the Serbian church. Due to protest from the Serbian Orthodox Church, the move was not recognised by any of the churches of the Eastern Orthodox Communion. Thereafter, Macedonian Orthodox Church was not in communion with any Orthodox Church, until 2022 when it was reintegrated. A small number of Macedonians belong to the Roman Catholic and the Protestant churches.

Between the 15th and the 20th centuries, during Ottoman rule, a number of Orthodox Macedonian Slavs converted to Islam. Today in the Republic of North Macedonia, they are regarded as Macedonian Muslims, who constitute the second largest religious community of the country.

=== Cuisine ===
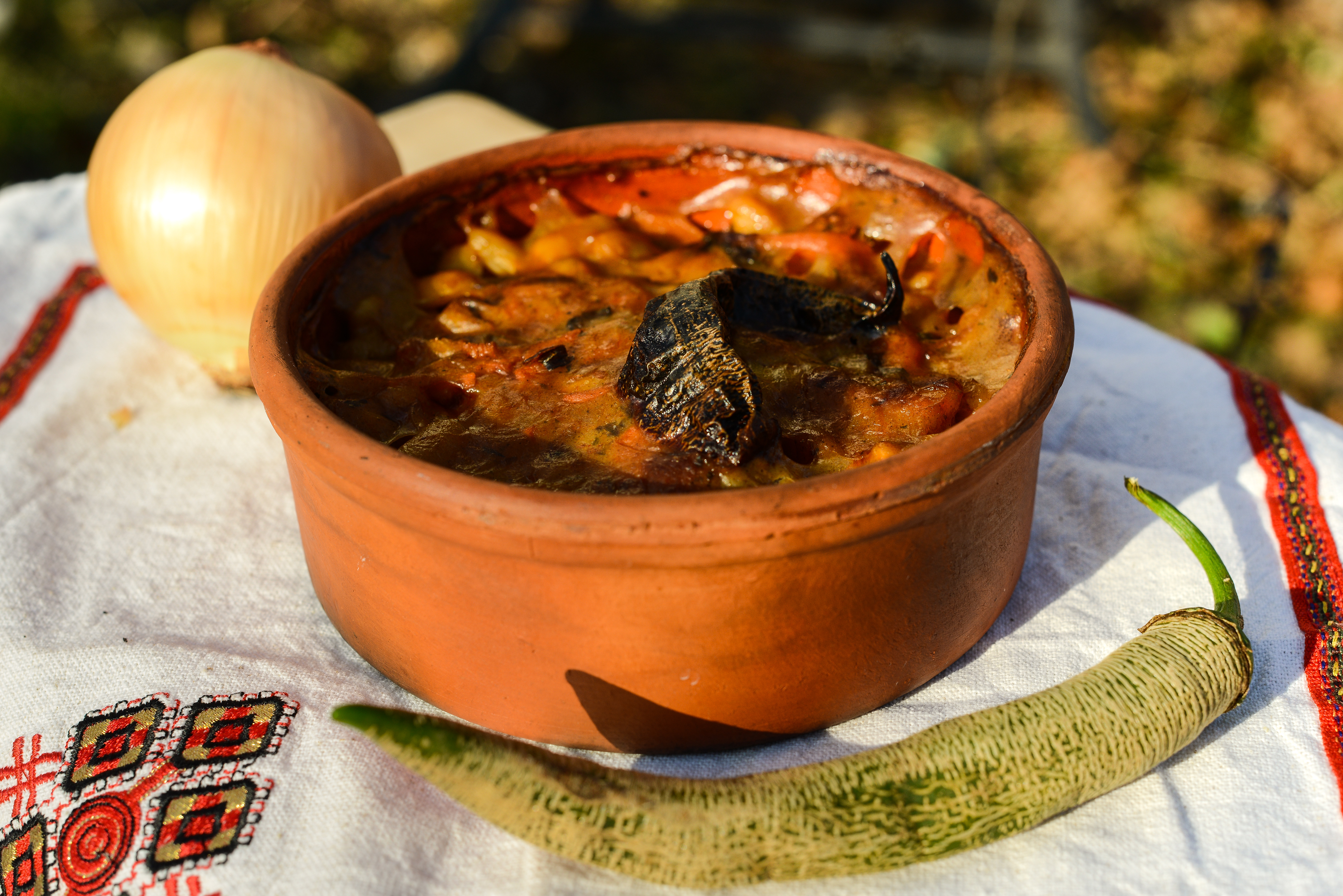
Tavče Gravče, the national dish of Macedonians.

Macedonian cuisine is a representative of the cuisine of the Balkans—reflecting Mediterranean (Greek) and Middle Eastern (Turkish) influences, and to a lesser extent Italian, German and Eastern European (especially Hungarian) ones. The relatively warm climate in North Macedonia provides excellent growth conditions for a variety of vegetables, herbs and fruits. Thus, Macedonian cuisine is particularly diverse.

Macedonian cuisine is also noted for the diversity and quality of its dairy products, wines, and local alcoholic beverages, such as rakija. Tavče Gravče and mastika are considered the national dish and drink of North Macedonia, respectively.

== Symbols ==
Symbols used by members of the ethnic group include:

- Lion: The lion first appears in the Fojnica Armorial from the 17th century, where the coat of arms of Macedonia is included among those of other entities. On the coat of arms is a crown; inside a yellow crowned lion is depicted standing rampant, on a red background. On the bottom enclosed in a red and yellow border is written "Macedonia". The use of the lion to represent Macedonia was continued in foreign heraldic collections throughout the 17th and 18th centuries. Nevertheless, during the late 19th century the Internal Macedonian-Adrianople Revolutionary Organization arose, which modeled itself after the earlier Bulgarian revolutionary traditions and adopted their symbols as the lion, etc. Modern versions of the historical lion has also been added to the emblem of several political parties, organizations and sports clubs. However, this symbol is not totally accepted while the state coat of arms of Bulgaria is somewhat similar.

Flag of the Republic of Macedonia (1992–1995) depicting the Vergina Sun

- Sun of Kutleš: the Macedonian term for the Vergina Sun; it was the official flag of the Republic of Macedonia from 1992 to 1995, and it is used unofficially by various associations and cultural groups in the Macedonian diaspora, as well as officially by the ethnic Macedonian-populated Pustec Municipality in Albania. The Vergina Sun is believed to have been associated with ancient Greek kings such as Alexander the Great and Philip II, although it was used as an ornamental design in ancient Greek art long before the Macedonian period. The symbol was depicted on a golden larnax found in a 4th-century BC royal tomb belonging to either Philip II or Philip III of Macedon in the Greek region of Macedonia. The Greeks regard the use of the symbol by North Macedonia as a misappropriation of a Hellenic symbol, unrelated to Slavic cultures, and a direct claim on the legacy of Philip II. However, archaeological items depicting the symbol have also been excavated in the territory of North Macedonia. In 1995, Greece lodged a claim for trademark protection of the Vergina Sun as a state symbol under WIPO. In Greece the symbol against a blue field is used vastly in the area of Macedonia and it has official status. The sun of Kutleš on a red field was the first flag of the independent Republic of Macedonia, until it was removed from the state flag under an agreement reached between the Republic of Macedonia and Greece in September 1995. On 17 June 2018, Greece and the Republic of Macedonia signed the Prespa Agreement, which stipulates the removal of the Vergina Sun's public use across the latter's territory. In a session held on early July 2019, the government of North Macedonia announced the complete removal of the Vergina Sun from all public areas, institutions and monuments in the country, with the deadline for its removal being set to 12 August 2019, in line with the Prespa Agreement.

== Genetics ==
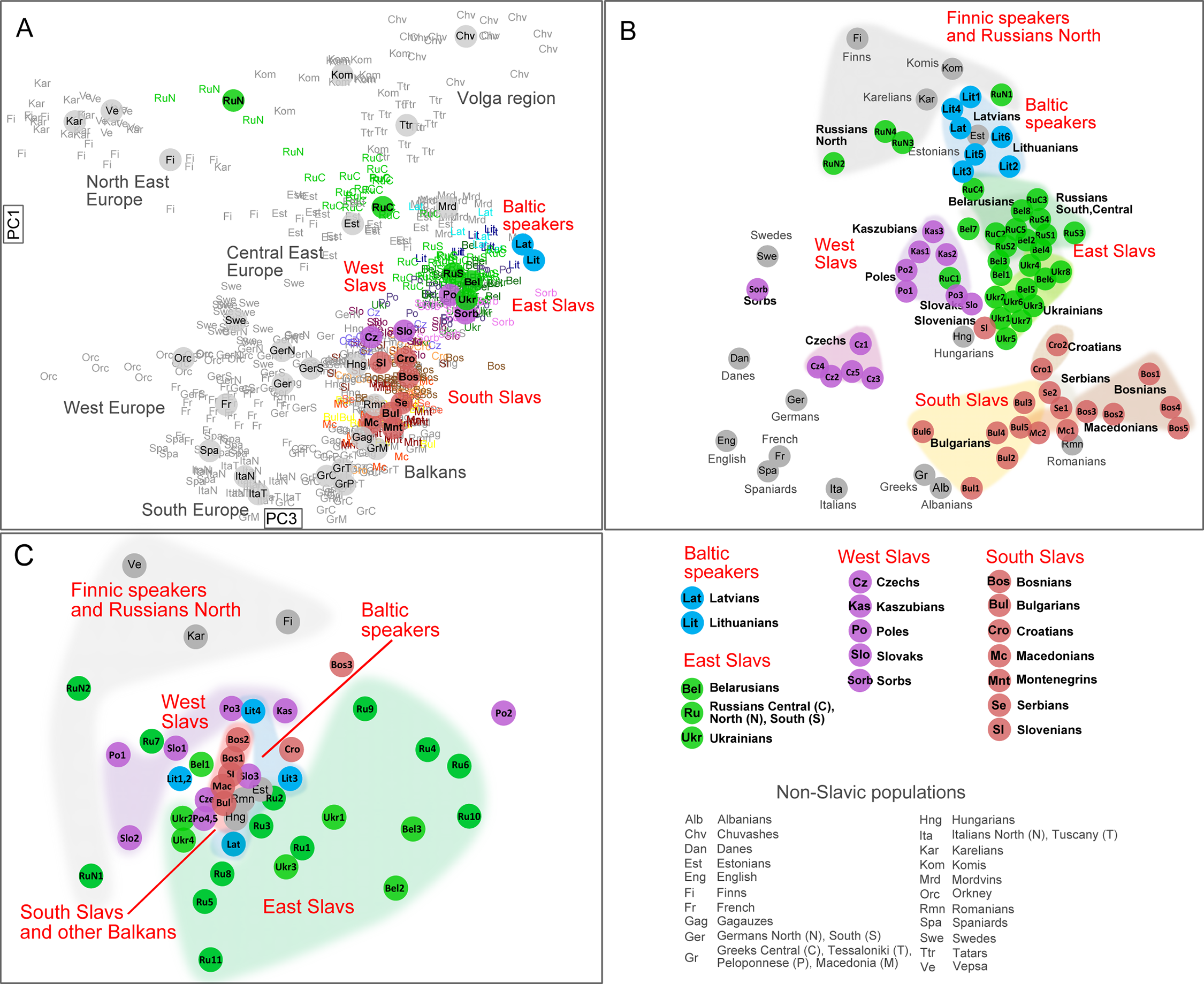
Balto-Slavic populations comprised genetically by: A (autosomal DNA, sample size=14), B (Y-DNA, sample size=2) and C (mtDNA, sample size=1) on the plots (Macedonian samples are marked as Mc in brown colored circle).

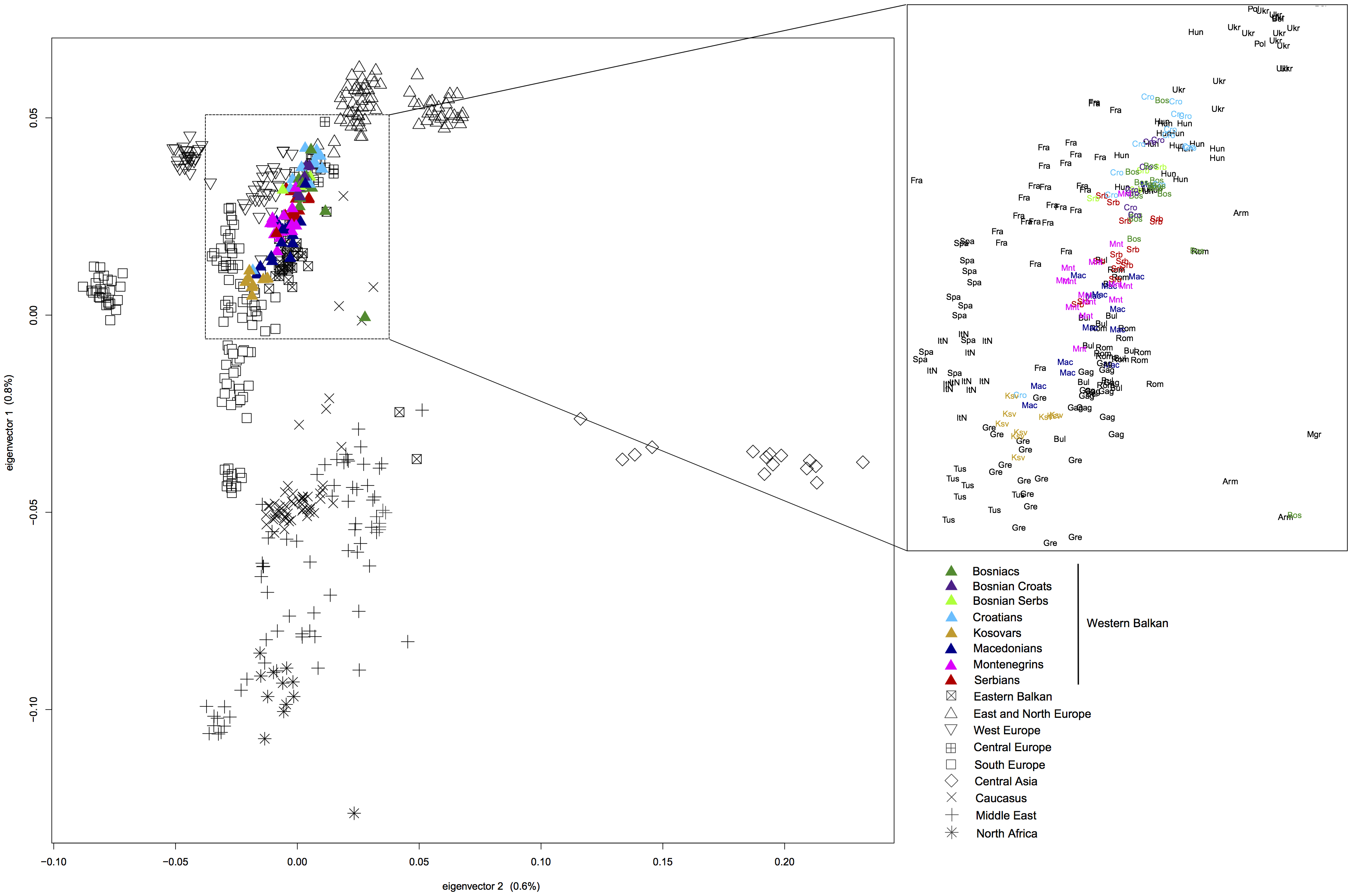
Principal component analysis (PCA) by Kovačević et al. (2014), showing the variation of autosomal SNPs with a focus on Western Balkan populations, where Macedonian samples are marked as Mac in dark blue font (sample size=12).

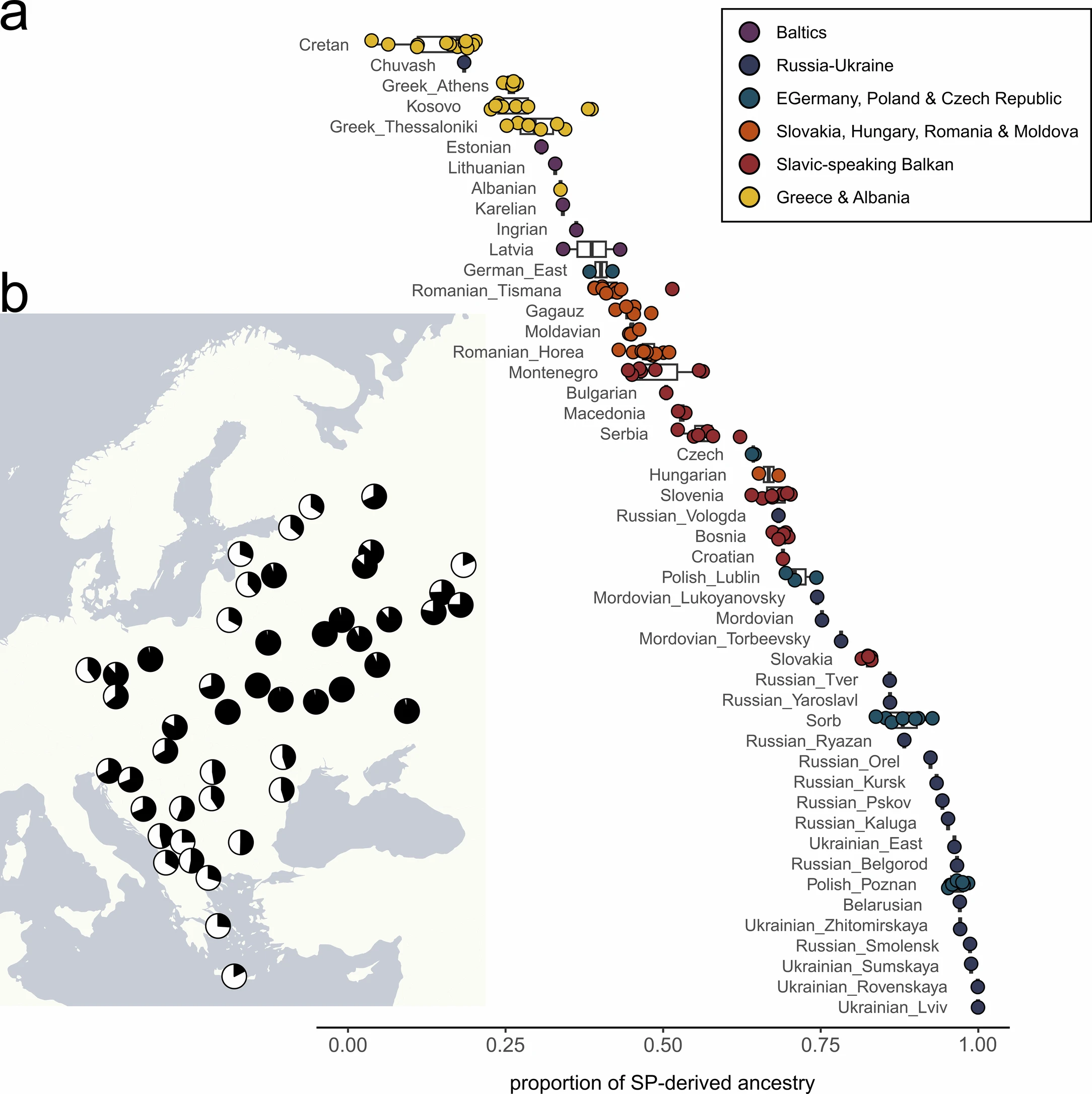
The genetic legacy of the Slavic expansion per Gretzinger et al. (2025), presented with black in figure b.

Anthropologically, Macedonians possess genetic lineages postulated to represent Balkan prehistoric and historic demographic processes. Such lineages are also typically found in neighboring South Slavs such as Bulgarians and Serbs, in addition to Greeks, Albanians, Romanians and Gagauzes. (Note: See:) According to a 2014 study, Macedonians autosomally cluster closer to Eastern Balkan populations (Bulgarians and Romanians), as well as Gagauzes (who appear to descend from northeastern Bulgaria), distinguishing them from other Western Balkan groups like Croatians and Bosnians, who align more with East Europeans. According to a 2015 study on Balto–Slavs and their proximal populations, the South Slavic samples (which included 14 Macedonian samples) are distinct from other Balto-Slavic groups, and show internal differentiation into western South Slavs (Slovenians, Croatians, Bosnians), eastern South Slavs (Macedonians, Bulgarians), and Serbians lying in an intermediate position. Despite occupying a smaller geographic area, South Slavs show genetic distances that are as large as, or larger than, those of East Slavs, with eastern South Slavs clustering closely with neighboring non-Slavic populations such as Romanians and, to some extent, Greeks.

Y-DNA studies suggest that Macedonians, along with neighboring South Slavs, are distinct from other Slavic-speaking populations in Europe, and near half of their Y-chromosome DNA haplogroups are likely to be inherited from inhabitants of the Balkans that predated sixth-century Slavic migrations. A diverse set of Y-DNA haplogroups are found in Macedonians at significant levels, including I2a1b, E-V13, R1a1, R1b, J2a, G2a, encoding a complex pattern of demographic processes. Similar distributions of the same haplogroups are found in neighboring populations. I2a1b (22–31%) and E-V13 (19–35%) are the most dominant Y-DNA haplogroups in Macedonians, followed by R1a (9–14%), J2 (6–16%) and R1b (5–16%) which occur at similar frequencies. I2a1b is typically found in Slavic-speaking populations in the Western Balkans (especially in the Dinaric Alps), while R1a1 is typically found in Slavic-speaking populations across Europe; haplogroups such as E-V13 and J2 occur at high frequencies in neighboring non-Slavic populations. On the other hand R1b is the most frequently occurring haplogroup in Western Europe and G2a is most frequently found in Caucasus and the adjacent areas. According to a DNA data for 17 Y-chromosomal STR loci in Macedonians, in comparison to other South Slavs and Kosovo Albanians, the Macedonian population had the lowest genetic (Y-STR) distance against the Bulgarian population while having the largest distance against the Croatian population. However, the observed populations did not have significant differentiation in Y-STR population structure, except partially for Kosovo Albanians. Genetic similarity, irrespective of language and ethnicity, has a strong correspondence to geographic proximity in European populations. MtDNA ancestry from the Macedonian population is similar to other European countries, sharing West Eurasian haplogroups; predominantly haplogroup H. Most frequent lineages in Macedonians are H (41.10%), Haplogroup U (16%) (with U5 at 8.90%), J (7.50%), T2 (6.20%), and X (6.20%). The haplogroups observed less frequently include W (4.0%) and K (5.0%).

In regard to population genetics, not all regions of Southeastern Europe had the same ratio of native Byzantine and invading Slavic population, with the territory of the Eastern Balkans (Macedonia, Thrace and Moesia) having a significant percentage of locals compared to Slavs. Considering that the majority of Balkan Slavs came via the Eastern Carpathian route, lower percentage in the east does not imply that the number of the Slavs there was lesser than among the Western South Slavs. Most probably on the territory of Western South Slavs was a state of desolation which produced there a founder effect. The region of Macedonia suffered less disruption than frontier provinces closer to the Danube, with towns and forts close to Ohrid, Bitola and along the Via Egnatia. Re-settlements and the cultural links of the Byzantine Era further shaped the demographic processes which the Macedonian ancestry is linked to. A 2023 archaeogenetic study published in Cell, confirmed that the spread of Slavic language in Southeastern Europe was because of large movements of people with specific Eastern European ancestry, and that more than half of the ancestry of most peoples in the Balkans today originates from the medieval Slavic migrations, with around 67% in Croats, 58% in Serbs, 55% in Romanians, 51% in Bulgarians, 40% in Greek Macedonians, 31% in Albanians, 30% in Peloponnesian Greeks, and 4–20% in Greeks from the Aegean Islands. In a 2025 archaeogenetic study, published in Nature, Gretzinger et al. using qpAdm analyses estimated that 40% to 56% of the ancestry in Serbs, Macedonians, Bulgarians, Montenegrins, Romanians, Moldavians, and Gagauzes, stems from medieval Eastern European ancestry, associated with the genetic legacy of the Slavic expansion.

In a 2020 survey of genetics and the Slavic languages, Kushniarevich and Kassian noted that South Slavs are clearly differentiated from West and East Slavs and sit genetically close to non-Slavic Balkan populations. They took this to indicate that Slavic languages spread mainly through cultural assimilation and language shift rather than through replacement of the earlier population, though they also found a migratory component in the long genomic segments shared between Slavic and non-Slavic Eastern Europeans. Davranoglou et al., in a 2026 study in Nature Human Behaviour based on more than 6,000 ancient West Eurasian genomes, used qpAdm models to estimate Eastern European-related ancestry on late Roman and post-Roman samples at 75–86% in Croatia, about 65% in Montenegro and Serbia, and about 40% in North Macedonia. Davranoglou and colleagues compared these figures with those of Kushniarevich et al. (2015), who used different methods and found that an ancestral component common across European populations, which peaks among Baltic speakers and decreases southwards, accounts for 55–70% of the ancestry of South Slavs, a grouping whose samples included Macedonians. That study assigned South Slavs a distinct "south-east European" substratum, in contrast to the "central-east European" one it identified in West and East Slavs, and concluded that the genetic diversity of present-day Slavs was "predominantly shaped in situ".

Comparison of Y-DNA haplogroup percentages in Macedonian populations
Haplogroup	2005 study (n = 150)	2011 study (n = 101)	2006 study (n = 84)	2005 study (n = 32)	2014 study (n = 51)
I2	30.7	21.8	28.6	21.9	23.5
E	23.3	35.6	25.0	18.8	23.5
R1b	13.3	6.9	4.8	9.4	15.7
R1a	8.7	12.9	14.3	12.5	11.8
J2	6.0	11.9	14.3	15.7	11.8
G2	6.0	2.0	7.1	6.3	3.9
I1	4.0	3.0	3.6	3.1	5.9
T1	3.3	2.0	1.2	6.3	3.9
J1	2.7	3.0	0.0	3.1	0.0

== See also ==
- Demographic history of North Macedonia
- List of Macedonians
- Ethnogenesis
- Macedonians (Greeks)
- Macedonians (Bulgarians)

== Bibliography ==
- Curta, Florin (2001). The Making of the Slavs: History and Archaeology of the Lower Danube Region, c. 500–700. Cambridge: Cambridge University Press. ISBN 978-1-139-42888-0.
- Curta, Florin (2004). "The Slavic Lingua Franca. Linguistic Notes of an Archaeologist Turned Historian". East Central Europe. 31 (1): 125–148. doi:10.1163/187633004x00134. Archived from the original (PDF) on 14 August 2012.
- Demeter, Gábor; Bottlik, Zsolt (2021). Maps in the Service of the Nation: The Role of Ethnic Mapping in Nation-Building and Its Influence on Political Decision-Making Across the Balkan Peninsula (1840–1914). Berlin: Frank & Timme.
- Fine, John V A Jr. (1991). The Early medieval Balkans. A Critical Survey from the 6th to the late 12th Century. University Michigan Press. ISBN 978-0-472-08149-3.
- Levinson, David; O'Leary, Timothy (1992). Encyclopedia of World Cultures. G.K. Hall. ISBN 0-8161-1808-6.
- Wilkinson, Henry Robert (1951). Maps and politics: a review of the ethnographic cartography of Macedonia. Liverpool: Liverpool University Press.
