= Macedonia, Texas =

Macedonia can refer to:

- Macedonia, Liberty County, Texas
- Macedonia, Williamson County, Texas
