= Republic of Macedonia (disambiguation) =

Republic of Macedonia may refer to:

- North Macedonia, a country in southeastern Europe, known until 2019 as the Republic of Macedonia
- Socialist Republic of Macedonia, a part of the former Yugoslavia (1945–1991) and a predecessor of North Macedonia

== See also ==
- Macedonia (disambiguation)
