= Macedonia =

Geographical and political division of Macedonia Greek Macedonia North Macedonia

Macedonia (Macedonian: Македонија, romanized: Makedonija, Greek: Μακεδονία, romanized: Makedonía, Bulgarian: Македония, romanized: Makedoniya, Albanian: Maqedonia), most commonly refers to:

- North Macedonia, a country in southeastern Europe, known as the Republic of Macedonia from 1991 until 2019
- Macedonia (ancient kingdom), also called Macedon, a kingdom in Greek antiquity
- Macedonia (Greece), also called Greek Macedonia, a geographic region spanning three administrative regions of Greece
- Macedonia (region), a geographic and historical region that today spans parts of Greece, North Macedonia, Bulgaria, Albania, Serbia and Kosovo

Macedonia, Makedonia, Makedonija, or Makedoniya may also refer to:

== Other historical entities ==
- Lower Macedonia, a geographical term used in antiquity referring to the coastal plain stretching along the coast of Thermaic Gulf
- Upper Macedonia, a geographical and tribal term in antiquity referring to the mountainous western parts of Macedon
- Achaemenid Macedonia, a term for the period of Macedon being a vassal and then client state of the Achaemenid Empire
- Macedonia (Roman province), a province of the early Roman Empire
- Diocese of Macedonia, a late Roman administrative unit
- Macedonia (theme), a province of the Byzantine Empire mostly in Thrace
- Socialist Republic of Macedonia (1944–1991), a constituent state of the former Yugoslavia, and the predecessor of North Macedonia

== Other geographical uses ==
=== Within the region of Macedonia ===
- Vardar Macedonia, a geographic region corresponding roughly to the territory of North Macedonia
- Aegean Macedonia, a term for the geographic region of Greek Macedonia
- Pirin Macedonia, a term for the geographic region of southwestern Bulgaria
- Central Macedonia, an administrative region of Greece
- Western Macedonia, an administrative region of Greece
- Eastern Macedonia and Thrace, an administrative region of Greece
- Decentralized Administration of Epirus and Western Macedonia, a decentralized administration of Greece
- Decentralized Administration of Macedonia and Thrace, a decentralized administration of Greece

=== United States ===
- Macedonia, Alabama
- Macedonia, Georgia
- Macedonia, Illinois
- Macedonia, Iowa
- Macedonia, Kentucky
- Macedonia, Missouri
- Macedonia, New Jersey
- Macedonia, Ohio
- Macedonia, South Carolina
- Macedonia, Tennessee
- Macedonia, Liberty County, Texas
- Macedonia, Williamson County, Texas
- Macedonia, Virginia

=== Others ===
- Macedônia, São Paulo, Brazil
- Macedonia, a village of Ciacova, Romania
- Macedonia, Glenrothes, Scotland, UK

== Publications ==
- Makedonia (newspaper), a Greek newspaper established in 1911
- Makedoniya (Bulgarian newspaper), a 19th-century Bulgarian newspaper published until 1872
- Macedonia (comics), a 2007 book by Harvey Pekar and Heather Roberson

== Ships ==
- SS Macedonia (1911), a Greek passenger liner that was renamed Pincio in 1922
- MV Makedoniya, a Bulgarian cargo ship in service 1932–41
- MV Makedonia, a Greek passenger ship in service 1984–85

== Sports ==
- FK Makedonija Gjorče Petrov, a football club in Skopje
- FC Macedonia, a former football club in Skopje (1941 to 1944)
- Preston Makedonia, an association football club in Melbourne, Australia, officially known since mid-1990s as the Preston Lions but still identified with the Macedonian-Australian community
- Stirling Macedonia FC, an association football club in Perth, Australia

== Other uses ==
- Macedonia (terminology)
- Macedonia (food), a fruit salad or vegetable dish
- Macedonia Airport or Thessaloniki International Airport, an airport in Thessaloniki, Greece
- Makedonia TV, a Greek television station
- Makedonia (dance), a Greek folk song
- Independent Macedonia (1944), a proposed puppet state of the Axis powers (1944)

== See also ==
- Macedonian (disambiguation)
- Macedon (disambiguation)
- Eastern Macedonia (disambiguation)
- Western Macedonia (disambiguation)
- Languages of Macedonia (disambiguation)
- Macedonian language (disambiguation)
- United Macedonia
- Portal:North Macedonia
- Portal:Greece
- Portal:Ancient Greece
