= Macedonia in the Middle Ages =

Macedonia in the Middle Ages may refer to:

- Macedonia (theme), a Byzantine theme (province) located in the region of Thrace
- Medieval history of Macedonia (region), medieval period in the history of the region of Macedonia
- Medieval history of North Macedonia, medieval period in the history of North Macedonia
- Medieval history of Macedonia (Greece), medieval period in the history of Greek Macedonia

== See also ==
- Macedonia (disambiguation)
