= Western Macedonia (disambiguation) =

Western Macedonia is an administrative region in northern Greece.

Western Macedonia may also refer to:

- western parts of the geographical and historical region of Macedonia
- western parts of the modern North Macedonia
- western parts of the ancient Kingdom of Macedonia
- western parts of the ancient Roman Province of Macedonia
- Decentralized Administration of Epirus and Western Macedonia, an administrative unit in Greece
- Mala Prespa and Golloborda, regions in eastern Albania
- Technological Educational Institute of Western Macedonia, an institute in Kozani, Greece
- University of Western Macedonia, a university in Kozani and Florina, Greece
- Western Macedonia Army Section, an army group of the Hellenic Army in World War II

== See also ==
- Macedonia (disambiguation)
- Eastern Macedonia (disambiguation)
