= Eastern Macedonia =

Eastern Macedonia most commonly refers to the western part of Eastern Macedonia and Thrace, in Greece.

It may also refer to:

- eastern parts of the wider geographical and historical region of Macedonia
- Pirin Macedonia, the part of the region of Macedonia in Bulgaria
- Eastern Statistical Region, a statistical region in modern North Macedonia
- eastern parts of the ancient Kingdom of Macedonia
- eastern parts of the ancient Roman Province of Macedonia
- Eastern Macedonia Army Section, an army group of the Hellenic Army in World War II
- Technological Educational Institute of Eastern Macedonia and Thrace, an institute in Kavala, Greece

== See also ==
- Macedonia (theme)
- Macedonia (disambiguation)
- Western Macedonia (disambiguation)
