= Macedon (disambiguation) =

Macedon, also called Macedonia or Makedonia, was a kingdom in ancient Greece.

Macedon or Makedon may also refer to:

- Makedon (mythology), the legendary ancestor of the ancient Macedonians
- any ancient Macedonian person; in plural Macedones, Macedons, Makedones or Makedons

== Places ==
=== Australia ===
- Macedon, Victoria
  - Macedon railway station, Victoria
  - Macedon Football Club
- Mount Macedon, a mountain, part of the Macedon Ranges in Macedon Regional Park
  - Mount Macedon, Victoria, a town
- Electoral district of Macedon, an electoral district in Victoria

=== UK ===
- Macedon (District Electoral Area), Northern Ireland, UK

=== United States ===
- Macedon, New York
- Macedon (hamlet), New York
- Macedon, Ohio

== See also ==
- Fillia Makedon, a Greek-American computer scientist
- Macedonians (Greeks)
- Macedonia (disambiguation)
