= Macedonia, Missouri =

Extinct hamlet in Missouri, U.S.

Coordinates: 38°01′23″N 91°46′11″W

Macedonia is an extinct town in northern Phelps County, in the U.S. state of Missouri.

The community is located just east of U.S. Route 63 (on old 63) approximately 4.5 miles north of Rolla. The Macedonia Church and cemetery lie one mile to the north.

== History ==
A post office called Macedonia was established in 1890, and remained in operation until 1917. The name Macedonia ultimately refers to the ancient Greek region and kingdom of Macedonia. Locally, however, the community took its name from the local Macedonia Baptist Church.
