= Macedonia, Williamson County, Texas =

Unincorporated community in Texas

Coordinates: 30.2627°N 94.8899°W

Macedonia is an unincorporated community in northeastern Williamson County, Texas, United States. The site, which at one time had a distinct community, is located on Farm to Market Road 971 and Opossum Creek, 2.5 miles (4.0 km) southwest of Granger. In 1988, a cemetery was the sole place in the former settlement. Its name is derived from the ancient Greek Kingdom of Macedonia.

== Education ==
The school in Macedonia had 99 students in 1900. The number of students gradually declined, and in 1949 the school was consolidated into the Palacky school.
