= Makedoniya (Bulgarian newspaper) =

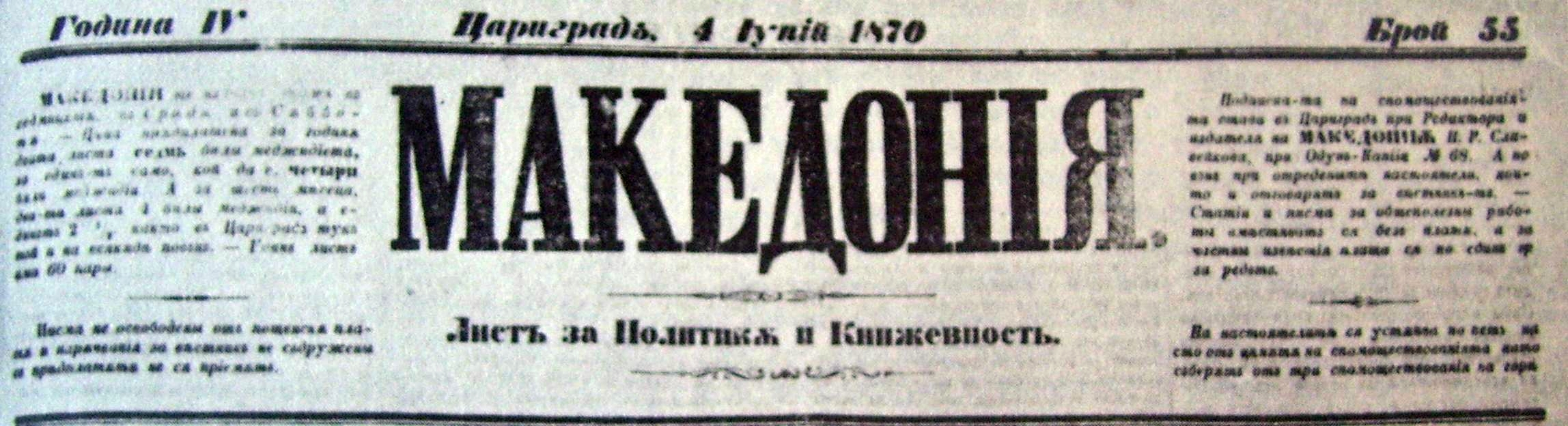
Title page of the 4 July 1870 issue of Makedoniya

Makedoniya (Bulgarian: Македония, originally spelled Македонія) was a Bulgarian newspaper edited and published by Petko Slaveykov in Istanbul with the aim to help the foundation of an independent Bulgarian Church. Started in 1866, Makedoniya was one of the first Bulgarian newspapers and among the most popular at the time; it published news items, articles and discussion papers in the Bulgarian language and sometimes in the Greek language. It was stopped from printing in 1872 after the creation of the Bulgarian Exarchate. The newspaper had the title "Macedonia", as its main task per Slaveykov himself, was to educate the misguided (sic): Grecomans there, who he called Macedonists.

== See also ==
- Makedonia, newspaper in Greece.
- Nova Makedonija, newspaper in the Republic of North Macedonia.
